= R706 (South Africa) =

Regional route in South Africa

Regional route R706

Route information
- Length: 106 km (66 mi)

Major junctions
- North-east end: N8 in Bloemfontein
- N1 in Bloemfontein
- South-west end: R704 near Jagersfontein

Location
- Country: South Africa

Highway system
- Numbered routes of South Africa
← R705	→ R707

The R706 is a Regional Route in South Africa that connects Bloemfontein with Jagersfontein in the Free State.

== Route ==
The R706 begins in Bloemfontein Central at a junction with the N8 (Nelson Mandela Drive; Zastron Street). It heads southwards as Markgraaff Street, then President Boshof Street (bypassing the Central University of Technology), then Kolbe Avenue, then Curie Avenue, passing the suburbs of Willows, Hospitaalpark, Generaal De Wet, Fleurdal, Fichardt Park and Fauna, to cross the N1 highway (Bloemfontein Western Bypass) and leave Bloemfontein heading south-west. The R706 proceeds for 99 kilometres to reach its end 10 kilometres south-east of Jagersfontein, at an intersection with the R704.
