= N8 (South Africa) =

National road in South Africa

National route N8

Route information
- Maintained by SANRAL
- Length: 583 km (362 mi)

Major junctions
- West end: N10 at Groblershoop
- N12 in Kimberley; N1 near Bloemfontein
- East end: A2 A2 at Maseru Bridge, Lesotho border

Location
- Country: South Africa
- Provinces: Northern Cape, Free State
- Major cities: Groblershoop; Kimberley; Bloemfontein; Botshabelo; Thaba 'Nchu

Highway system
- Numbered routes of South Africa
← N7	→ N9

The N8 is a national route in South Africa that connects Groblershoop (south-east of Upington) with Maseru in Lesotho via Kimberley and Bloemfontein. It is maintained by the South African National Roads Agency.

The section of road from Groblershoop through Griekwastad and Schmidtsdrift to Kimberley was previously designated as part of the R64.

== Route ==
Detailed Route

=== Northern Cape ===
The road starts at Groblershoop in the Northern Cape (115 km south-east of Upington) at a junction with the N10. It runs east for 285 km, through Griekwastad, crossing the Vaal River at Schmidtsdrift, to Kimberley (Capital of the Northern Cape). It enters as Schmidtsdrift Road, then Long Street, and reaches a junction with the N12, just west of the N12's intersection with the R64 (an alternative route to Bloemfontein).

It turns south-east to be co-signed with the N12 as Bultfontein Road up to the Bishops Road junction, where the N12 turns south, leaving the N8 as the south-easterly road. At the roundabout by Kimberley Boys High School, the N8 turns south as Oliver Street, then south-east as Nathan Street (where it bypasses the Kimberley Airport), to exit the Northern Cape and cross into the Free State province.

=== Free State ===
From Kimberley, the N8 goes eastwards for 150 kilometres, crossing the Modder River, through Petrusburg (where it meets the northern terminus of the R48), to Bloemfontein (Capital of the Free State and judicial capital of South Africa), where it meets the N1 highway (Bloemfontein Western Bypass) at a ramp junction near Universitas.

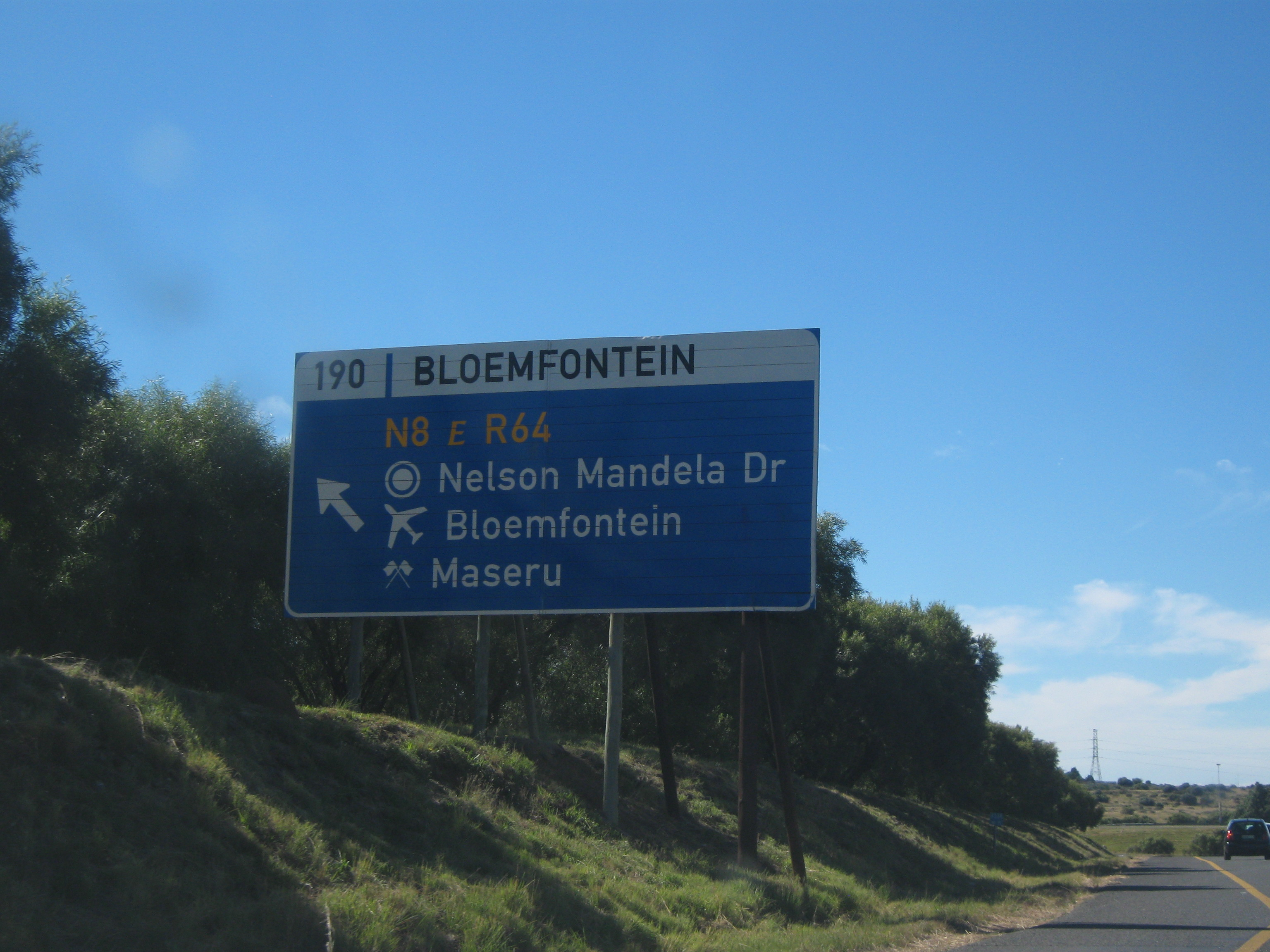
A road sign on the N1 in Bloemfontein before the N8 interchange

The N8 joins the N1 highway northwards for 3 km up to the next off-ramp, where it meets the eastern terminus of the R64 (an alternative route from Kimberley). As the R64 is the road to the west, the N8 becomes the road to the east (Nelson Mandela Drive), bypassing the University of the Free State, Brandwag and Westdene, into Bloemfontein Central. In the Bloemfontein CBD, the N8 passes through as two one-way streets (Nelson Mandela Drive westwards and Zastron Street eastwards). At the junction with the M30 metropolitan route, the N8 becomes one street eastwards again (Alexandra Avenue).

After the Bloemfontein town centre, the N8 heads eastwards to form an interchange with the M10 metropolitan route (George Lubbe Street) and proceeds to bypass the Bram Fischer International Airport and the Air Force Base Bloemspruit. From the airport, it runs eastwards for 78 kilometres, through Botshabelo and Thaba 'Nchu, to reach the southern outskirts of Ladybrand. Just before Ladybrand, the N8 is joined by the R26 route and they are co-signed eastwards for 12 km up to the southern part of Ladybrand, where the N8 becomes its own road southwards while the R26 turns north towards Ladybrand CBD.

From the R26 split, the N8 goes southwards for 12 kilometres to end on the Lesotho border at the Maseru Bridge on the Mohokare River (Caledon River), with the city of Maseru, Lesotho's Capital, on the other side of the river.

== Junctions ==
=== Northern Cape ===
Municipality	Location	km	mi	Exit	Destinations	Notes
ǃKheis	Groblershoop	0	0	—	N10, Groblershoop, Marydale, Upington	At-grade intersection
Siyancuma	Griekwastad	88	55	—	R309, Postmasburg	At-grade intersection
Siyancuma	Griekwastad	120	75	—	R313, Niekerkshoop, Prieska	At-grade intersection
Siyancuma	Griekwastad	136	85	—	R325, Postmasburg, Lime Acres	At-grade intersection
Siyancuma	Campbell	182	113	—	R385, Douglas, Lime Acres, Postmasburg	At-grade intersection
Siyancuma	Schmidtsdrift	212	132	—	R370 south, Douglas	At-grade intersection; Western end of concurrency with R370
Siyancuma	Schmidtsdrift	217	135	—	R370 north, Schmidtsdrift, Delportshoop	At-grade intersection; Eastern end of concurrency with R370
Sol Plaatje	Kimberley	281	175	—	R31, Barkly West, Hopetown, Britstown	At-grade traffic circle
Sol Plaatje	Kimberley	285	177	—	R357 Carters Road, Douglas	At-grade intersection
Sol Plaatje	Kimberley	287	178	—	N12 Lennox Street east, Johannesburg, R64, Boshof	At-grade intersection; Western end of concurrency with N12
Sol Plaatje	Kimberley	287	178	—	N12 Bishops Avenue south, Hopetown, Britstown	At-grade intersection; Eastern end of concurrency with N12
N8 continues into the Free State

=== Free State ===
Municipality	Location	km	mi	Exit	Destinations	Notes
Letsemeng	Petrusburg	367	228	—	R48, Koffiefontein, Fauresmith	At-grade intersection
Letsemeng	Petrusburg	368	229	—	Monument Road, Bolokanang, Petrusburg	
Mangaung	Bloemfontein	442	275	(186)	N1 Bloemfontein Western Bypass south, Colesberg, M19 Walter Sisulu Road, Wilgehof, Universitas	Southern end of concurrency with N1
Mangaung	Bloemfontein	446	277	(190)	N1 Bloemfontein Western Bypass north, Kroonstad, R64 Nelson Mandela Drive, Boshof	Northern end of concurrency with N1
Mangaung	Bloemfontein	452	281	—	R706 Markgraaff Street, Jagersfontein	At-grade intersection
Mangaung	Bloemfontein	452	281	—	R700 Aliwal Street, Bultfontein	At-grade intersection
Mangaung	Bloemfontein	453	281	—	M30 East Burger Street, Noordhoek	At-grade intersection
Mangaung	Bloemfontein	457	284	—	M10 Rudolf Greyling Street, Noordhoek, Heidedal, Mangaung	
Mangaung	Bloemfontein	460	286	—	Bram Fischer Airport Road, Bram Fischer International. Maselspoort	
Mangaung	Botshabelo	502	312	—	Main Road, Botshabelo	
Mangaung	Thaba 'Nchu	513	319	—	Brand Street, Thaba 'Nchu, Dewetsdorp	
Mantsopa	Tweespruit	534	332	—	R709, Tweespruit, Hobhouse	At-grade intersection
Mantsopa	Ladybrand	568	353	—	R26 south, Hobhouse, Wepener	At-grade intersection; Western end of concurrency with R26
Mantsopa	Ladybrand	580	360	—	R26 north, Ladybrand, Ficksburg	At-grade intersection; Eastern end of concurrency with R26
Mantsopa	Ladybrand	591	367	Maseru Bridge Border Post		
N8 ends at South Africa–Lesotho border; A2 A2 begins
