= Universitas, Bloemfontein =

Universitas
- Location within Free State (South African province) Location within South Africa
- Coordinates: 29.118°S 26.174°E
- Country: South Africa
- Province: Free State
- Municipality: Mangaung
- Main Place: Bloemfontein
  - Councillor: (ANC)

Area
  - Total: 5.36 km^{2} (2.07 sq mi)

Population (2011)
  - Total: 9,076
  - Density: 1,690/km^{2} (4,390/sq mi)

Racial makeup (2011)
  - Black African: 23.1%
  - Coloured: 3.1%
  - Indian/Asian: 1.1%
  - White: 72.3%
  - Other: 0.4%

First languages (2011)
  - Afrikaans: 73.6%
  - English: 11.8%
  - Sotho: 6.9%
  - Tswana: 2.2%
  - Other: 5.5%
- Time zone: UTC+2 (SAST)
- Postal code (street): 9301
- PO box: 9321
- Area code: 051

Universitas used to be a white suburb of the city of Bloemfontein during the Apartheid era. Today, the racial composition is mixed, and a significant number of the family homes in the suburb have been adapted to serve as communal student accommodation, due to the favourable location near the campuses of the Free State University as well as the Central University of Technology.

Universitas borders on the suburbs Willows, Wilgehof, Gardenia Park, Langenhoven Park and Brandwag.

Before becoming a residential suburb, the area was used for agriculture and the Bloemfontein race course was located where the oval-shaped Paul Kruger Avenue runs today.
