= R64 =

R64 may refer to:

- R64 (South Africa), a road
- HMCS Sioux (R64), a destroyer of the Royal Canadian Navy
- HMS Theseus (R64), an aircraft carrier of the Royal Navy
- R64: May cause harm to breast-fed babies, a risk phrase in chemistry
- Small nucleolar RNA R64/Z200 family
