= R64 (South Africa) =

Provincial route in South Africa

Provincial route R64

Route information
- Maintained by NCDRPW and FSDPRT
- Length: 170 km (110 mi)

Major junctions
- West end: N8 / N12 in Kimberley
- R59 near Dealesville
- East end: N1 / N8 in Bloemfontein

Location
- Country: South Africa
- Major cities: Kimberley, Boshof, Dealesville, Bloemfontein

Highway system
- Numbered routes of South Africa
← R63	→ R65

The R64 is a provincial route in South Africa that connects Kimberley with Bloemfontein via Boshof and Dealesville. It is slightly longer than the newer N8 route via Petrusburg, by about 10 kilometres.

The R64 used to continue westwards from Kimberley through Griekwastad to Groblershoop. That stretch of road is now part of the N8 route.

== Route ==
Detailed Route

=== Free State ===
The R64 begins at an interchange with the N1 highway (Bloemfontein Western Bypass) and the N8 national route in Bloemfontein (Capital of the Free State), just west of the city centre. It begins by heading north-west for 31 kilometres to cross the Modder River adjacent to the Krugersdrift Dam and Soetdoring Nature Reserve. It continues north-west for another 30 kilometres, exiting the Mangaung Metropolitan Municipality, to meet the western terminus of the R703 road and enter the town of Dealesville.

In Dealesville central, it turns west at the Brand Street junction and heads 18 kilometres to meet the south-western terminus of the R59 road. It proceeds westwards for 36 kilometres to enter the town of Boshof.

=== Northern Cape ===
From Boshof, the R64 heads west-south-west for 52 kilometres to cross into the Northern Cape and enter the city of Kimberley (Capital of the Northern Cape). It makes a left turn at the Hull Street junction and proceeds to end at an intersection with the N12 and N8 national routes in the Kimberley city centre.
