= Krugersdrift Dam =

- Interactive map of Krugersdrift Dam
- Official name: Krugersdrift Dam
- Country: South Africa
- Location: Free State
- Coordinates: 28°53′1″S 25°57′0″E
- Purpose: Irrigation
- Opening date: 1970
- Owner: Department of Water Affairs

Dam and spillways
- Type of dam: Arch-gravity dam
- Impounds: Modder River
- Height: 25 m (82 ft)
- Length: 4,956 m (16,260 ft)

Reservoir
- Creates: Krugerdrift Dam Reservoir
- Total capacity: 66,000,000 m^{3} (54,000 acre⋅ft)
- Catchment area: 6,331 km^{2} (2,444 mi^{2})
- Surface area: 1,853 ha (4,580 acres)

The Krugersdrift Dam in the Modder River is 35 km northwest of Bloemfontein, Free State Province of South Africa with a capacity of 73.2 million cubic metres. It was built in 1970 with a wall length of 3114 m, height of 26 m and a surface area of 1 853 ha. The huge dam is very shallow and can lose its water in a short period of time due to usage and evaporation. The dam is situated in the Soetdoring Nature Reserve and holds yellowfish, Orange River mudfish, barbel and carp.

It is a popular birding venue with large numbers of South African shelduck, Spur-winged geese and Egyptian geese. Access to the reserve is from the Bloemfontein-Bultfontein road (R700) or from the Bloemfontein-Kimberley road (R64); the reserve is about 40 kilometres from Bloemfontein's city centre.

== See also ==
- List of reservoirs and dams in South Africa
- List of rivers of South Africa
