= R48 (South Africa) =

Provincial route in South Africa

Provincial route R48

Route information
- Maintained by NCDRPW and FSDPRT
- Length: 253 km (157 mi)

Major junctions
- Southwest end: N10 near De Aar
- Northeast end: N8 at Petrusburg

Location
- Country: South Africa
- Major cities: De Aar, Philipstown, Petrusville, Luckhoff, Koffiefontein, Petrusburg

Highway system
- Numbered routes of South Africa
← R46	→ R49

The R48 is a provincial route in South Africa that connects De Aar with Petrusburg on the N8 via Petrusville and Koffiefontein.

== Route ==
Detailed Route

The R48 begins west of the town centre of De Aar, at a junction with the N10 national route. It begins by going eastwards into De Aar's northern suburbs up to the Friedlander street junction, where the R48 turns to the north-east. It goes for 42 km east-north-east to the town of Philipstown. It enters Philipstown in an easterly direction and meets the northern terminus of the R389 road at a junction in the town centre, where it turns northwards.

From Philipstown, the R48 goes north-north-east for 40 kilometres to meet the R369 road and enter the town of Petrusville. The R369 joins the R48 and they are one road northwards for 20 kilometres, passing through Petrusville Central and bypassing Vanderkloof to the west, before the R48 becomes its own road northwards while the R369 turns to the north-west.

From the R369 split west of Vanderkloof, the R48 heads north-north-east for 33 kilometres, crossing the Orange River into the Free State, to the town of Luckhoff. It continues north-north-east for 43 kilometres to meet the north-western terminus of the R704 road in the town of Koffiefontein. It makes a left and a right turn before continuing northwards for 10 kilometres, crossing the Riet River, to reach a junction with the southern terminus of the R705 road.

From the junction with the R705 north of Koffiefontein, the R48 goes north-east for 43 kilometres to reach its north-eastern terminus in the town of Petrusburg, at a junction with the N8 national route south-west of the town centre.
