= Arboretum (disambiguation) =

An arboretum is a collection of trees.

Arboretum may also refer to:

- Arboretum (Austin, Texas), a retail trade area in Austin, Texas
- Arboretum (Washington, D.C.), a neighborhood of Washington, D.C.
- Arboretum, Bloemfontein, a suburb of Bloemfontein, South Africa
- Arboretum (ward), an electoral ward in Derby, England
- The Arboretum, Nottingham, a city park and former electoral ward in Nottingham, England
- "Arboretum", a 2002 instrumental by Prince from One Nite Alone...

== See also ==
- Arbouretum, an American indie rock band
