= Western Bypass =

Western Bypass can refer to several roads, or bypasses

== India ==
- Western Bypass, Coimbatore
- West Island Freeway, Mumbai
- Dehu Road–Katraj bypass, Pune

== South Africa ==
- N1 Western Bypass (Johannesburg), a section of the Johannesburg Ring Road
- Bloemfontein Ring Road, a road bypassing Bloemfontein
