= Bloemfontein Ring Road =

Ring Road in South Africa

Bloemfontein Ring Road

Route information
- Length: 39.3 km (24.4 mi)
- Existed: 2016 –present

Major junctions
- Ring road around Bloemfontein
- North end: R30 near Bayswater
- R700 near Bloemfontein North; R64 / N8 near Bloemfontein Central; N8 near Universitas; R706 near Musgrave
- South end: N6 near Bloemanda

Location
- Country: South Africa

Highway system
- Numbered routes of South Africa

The Bloemfontein Ring Road, also known as the Bloemfontein bypass, is a halfway ring road that circles the city of Bloemfontein, South Africa. It is part of the N1 national route.

== Route ==
The Bloemfontein ring road begins north of Bloemfontein, at an interchange with the R30 (northbound only). The route heads south-west, then south, around Bloemfontein, first meeting the R700 before meeting the R64 and N8 just west of Bloemfontein Central.

The N8 joins the bypass for 3km up to the next off-ramp adjacent to Universitas, where it becomes the road westwards towards Kimberley. The ring road continues south, meeting the R706, to reach an interchange with the N6, where it ends.

== See also ==
- Ring roads in South Africa
