= Fauna (disambiguation) =

Fauna is a collective term for animal life.

Fauna may also refer to:

- Fauna (deity), an ancient Roman goddess
- Fauna, Bloemfontein, a suburb of the South African city of Bloemfontein
- Fauna (Oh Land album), a 2008 album by Oh Land
- Fauna (Haken album), a 2023 album by Haken
- Fauna (film), a 2020 Mexican/Canadian drama film
- Fauna, a fictional character from Disney's Sleeping Beauty, see Flora, Fauna, and Merryweather
- Fauna, a 2009 Spiel des Jahres-nominated board game
- Fauna, a female character in Sweet Thursday, a novel by John Steinbeck
- Florian-Ayala Fauna, American artist, musician, and music producer
- Ceres Fauna, a VTuber from Hololive English
