= R705 road =

R705 road may refer to:

- R705 road (Ireland)
- R705 (South Africa)
