= Noordhoek =

Noordhoek may refer to:

- Noordhoek, Cape Town, South Africa
- Noordhoek, Bloemfontein, South Africa
- Noordhoek (Rucphen), a location in North Brabant, the Netherlands
- Noordhoek, Moerdijk, the Netherlands
