= National Afrikaans Literary Museum and Research Centre =

Museum and research center in South Africa

Coordinates: 29°6′59.87″S 26°12′59.72″E

- Nasionale Afrikaanse Letterkundige Museum en Navorsingsentrum (NALN)
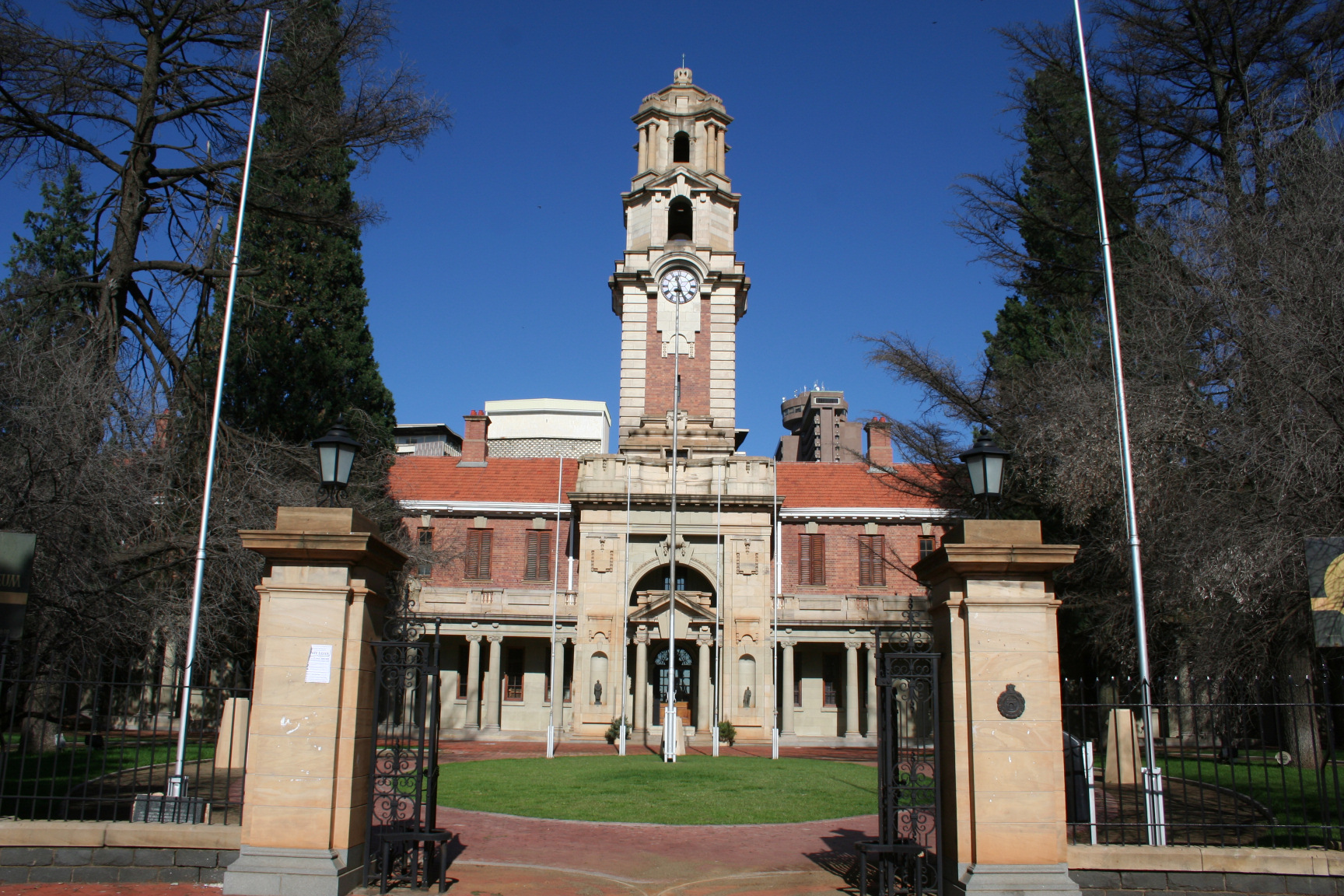
- Established: 24 March 1973; 53 years ago
- Location: Bloemfontein, Free State, South Africa
- Type: Literature, Music, Drama
- Collection size: 750,000+ items

The National Afrikaans Literary Museum and Research Centre (Afrikaans: Nasionale Afrikaanse Letterkundige Museum en Navorsingsentrum, NALN) is a central archive for material and information on the history, development, and scope of literature, music, and drama in the Afrikaans language. The NALN was founded on 24 March 1973 by the Free State provincial government and is based in Bloemfontein, South Africa. It operates as a nonprofit organization. The hours are Monday through Friday, 8:00 - 16:00.

The NALN collection includes an estimated three quarters of a million items. These include books, manuscripts, magazines, newspapers, clippings, sheet music, posters, and programs, an audiovisual collection, and other unique artifacts. In addition, furniture and other effects of writers and other literary personalities can be viewed here.

In front of the museum is a garden where several dignitaries have planted trees over the years. Busts of writers, musicians, and dramatists have been installed under the trees.

== Building ==
NALN is located in the Old Free State Government Building. The building was commissioned by President Johannes Brand to house the various government departments of the Orange Free State government. The first story's front facade was designed by Richard Wocke and the keystone was laid by President Brand on May 31, 1875. In 1895, the second story was built, designed by Johannes Egbertus Vixseboxse. The remainder of the building was designed by Sir Herbert Baker, architect of the Union Buildings in Pretoria, and was completed in 1906.

On October 28, 1908, the original building was destroyed in a fire. From 1909 to 1911, it was largely restored based on Baker's blueprint. Improvements, especially in the facade and tower, were the work of the government architect F. Taylor. The tower was, among other things, narrower and 10.5 m higher than the original one and was fitted with a rounded crown.

From 1877 to 1902, the Old Government Building was the headquarters of the Government of the Orange Free State. The Volksraad met in the Third Council Chamber from 1877 to 1893. Afterwards, it remained the seat of the Government of the Orange River Colony, and in 1911 became the provincial headquarters of the Orange Free State. In 1972, the building was declared a national heritage site.

== History ==
The Human Sciences Research Council began mounting exhibits in the building and using it as an archive for documents on language and literature in 1970. The document archive developed into the Literary Museum of Bloemfontein. On October 9, 1972, the lawyer Gabriel Francois van Lingen Froneman, the Administrator of Free State, announced the establishment of the NALN. On March 24, 1973, the NALN was officially opened by Johannes Petrus van der Spuy, at the time Minister of National Education.

Since 1996, the NALN has brought renewed focus to the works of black and Cape Coloured authors in Afrikaans and expanded its collection of same.

Gradual declines in priority and funding necessitated a downsizing in 2007, in which a great deal of professional expertise was lost. Departmentally, the institution's name was changed to the Afrikaans Literary Museum (ALM) and is now operating as a local institution in Free State province.

A failed attempt to renovate the building led to a six-year disruption of activities starting in 2002. Exhibits covering 1 500 m^{2} were reworked to portray Afrikaans literature from a post-1994 perspective.

== Sesotho Literary Museum (Dingolweng) ==
The Sesotho Literary Museum is the first African Literary Museum in Free State and South Africa. The establishment of this Museum was facilitated by the Afrikaans Literary Museum of the Free State Department of e,Arts, Culture and Recreation. It started operating in 2006. Located in the same provincial building as the Afrikaans Literary Museum(NALN), at corner Charlotte Maxeke and President Brand Streets.Bloemfontein

 Sesotho

The Museum is a research Centre for Sesotho Literature, Culture and Sesotho authors. The Sesotho Literary Museum have archived literature from prominent writers such as the late K.P.D Maphalla, Thomas Mofolo and James Jantjies Moiloa whose book collection and artifacts form part of the museum's collection.

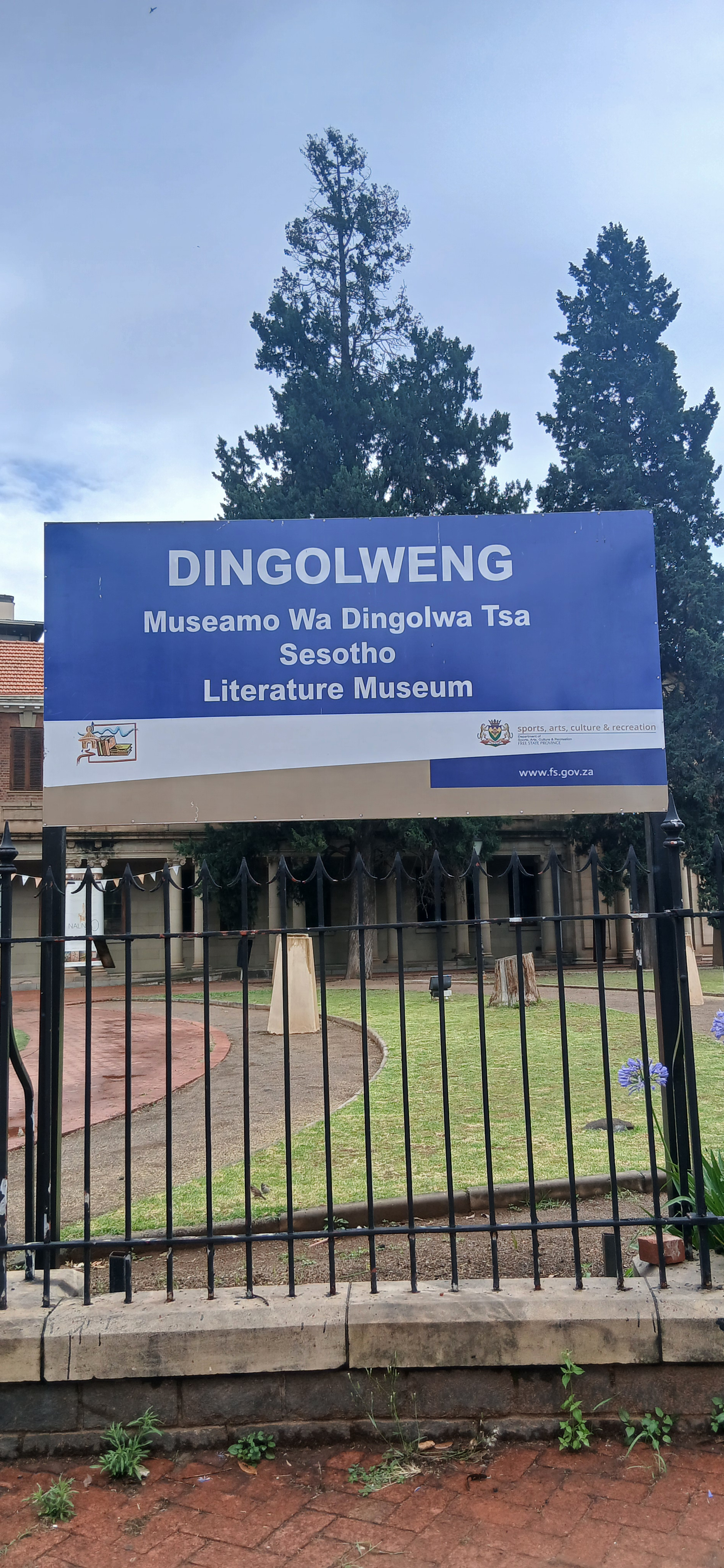
Dingolweng tsa Museamo wa Sesotho

Donations have been received from Prof J.G Gildenhuys, Mr R.J.R Masiea, T.W.D Mohapi, A.M Miloa, Marita Van Aswegen and Free State (province) Library service among others.

Sesotho Literary Museum has recently received over 840 books as donation from the late Prof S Guma's personal library. In the exhibition room these donations as well as photographs of the authors are on display. Sesotho Literary Museum has appeared on e.tv on 14 May 2012, in a short documentary by Hlasela TV, and several other print media coverage. Sesotho Literary Museum continues to hold a series of literary exhibitions. Members of the public are encouraged to visit our facilities for recreational and research purposes, to do ate booms and Support our community outreach programmes.
