= Navalsig =

- Location within Free State (South African province) Location within South Africa
- Coordinates: 29.107°S 26.240°E
- Country: South Africa
- Province: Free State
- Municipality: Mangaung
- Main Place: Bloemfontein

Area
  - Total: 0.46 km^{2} (0.18 sq mi)

Population (2011)
  - Total: 2,375
  - Density: 5,200/km^{2} (13,000/sq mi)

Racial makeup (2011)
  - Black African: 63.8%
  - Coloured: 4.3%
  - Indian/Asian: 1.2%
  - White: 27.6%
  - Other: 1.7%

First languages (2011)
  - Afrikaans: 38.2%
  - Sotho: 45.4%
  - English: 24.4%
  - Tswana: 5.3%
  - Other: 15.7%
- Time zone: UTC+2 (SAST)
- Postal code (street): 9301
- PO box: 9301

Navalsig is a mixed race suburb of the city of Bloemfontein in South Africa.
