= Ehrlich Park, Bloemfontein =

Ehrlich Park
- Location within Free State (South African province) Location within South Africa
- Coordinates: 29.176°S 26.194°E
- Country: South Africa
- Province: Free State
- Municipality: Mangaung
- Main Place: Bloemfontein

Area
  - Total: 2.21 km^{2} (0.85 sq mi)

Population (2011)
  - Total: 4,644
  - Density: 2,100/km^{2} (5,440/sq mi)

Racial makeup (2011)
  - Black African: 79.8%
  - Coloured: 6.3%
  - White: 13.0%

First languages (2011)
  - Sotho: 42.3%
  - Afrikaans: 20.2%
  - Tswana: 16.9%
  - Xhosa: 9.9%
  - Other: 10.7%
- Time zone: UTC+2 (SAST)
- Postal code (street): 9312
- PO box: 9301
- Area code: 051

Ehrlich Park is a suburb of the city of Bloemfontein in South Africa.
