= Uitsig, Bloemfontein =

Uitsig
- Onze rust
- Location within Free State (South African province) Location within South Africa
- Coordinates: 29.163°S 26.197°E
- Country: South Africa
- Province: Free State
- Municipality: Mangaung
- Main Place: Bloemfontein
- Established: 1980

Area
  - Total: 1.92 km^{2} (0.74 sq mi)

Population (2011)
  - Total: 4,313
  - Density: 2,250/km^{2} (5,820/sq mi)

Racial makeup (2011)
  - Black African: 22.5%
  - Coloured: 4.9%
  - Indian/Asian: 0.7%
  - White: 71.2%
  - Other: 0.7%

First languages (2011)
  - Afrikaans: 74.8%
  - Sotho: 9.9%
  - English: 6.2%
  - Tswana: 4.5%
  - Other: 4.6%
- Time zone: UTC+2 (SAST)
- Postal code (street): 8423
- PO box: 9301

Uitsig is a suburb of the city of Bloemfontein in South Africa.

Uitsig is a fairly new and still expanding suburb, but also has its more established parts and is located in the southern part of Bloemfontein. With the newly renovated and expanded Fauna Shopping Centre in close proximity, this is a very popular neighbourhood to live in. Access to the N1 is easy from Uitsig. The Life Rosepark Hospital is also nearby. Property in Uitsig ranges from comfortable family homes to townhouse complexes and a couple of clusters and duets. In terms of properties, it roughly consists of 70% houses and 30% sectional title properties like townhouses, flats or duets.

Schools in the suburb include Uitsig Primary School and Bloemfontein South High School.
