= Dealesville =

- Location within Free State (South African province) Location within South Africa
- Coordinates: 28°40′S 25°46′E
- Country: South Africa
- Province: Free State
- District: Lejweleputswa
- Municipality: Tokologo

Area
  - Total: 29.31 km^{2} (11.32 sq mi)

Population (2011)
  - Total: 5,446
  - Density: 185.8/km^{2} (481.2/sq mi)

Racial makeup (2011)
  - Black African: 89.4%
  - Coloured: 1.3%
  - Indian/Asian: 1.8%
  - White: 7.3%
  - Other: 0.3%

First languages (2011)
  - Tswana: 56.9%
  - Xhosa: 19.4%
  - Sotho: 10.2%
  - Afrikaans: 9.0%
  - Other: 4.5%
- Time zone: UTC+2 (SAST)
- Postal code (street): 9348
- PO box: 9348
- Area code: 051

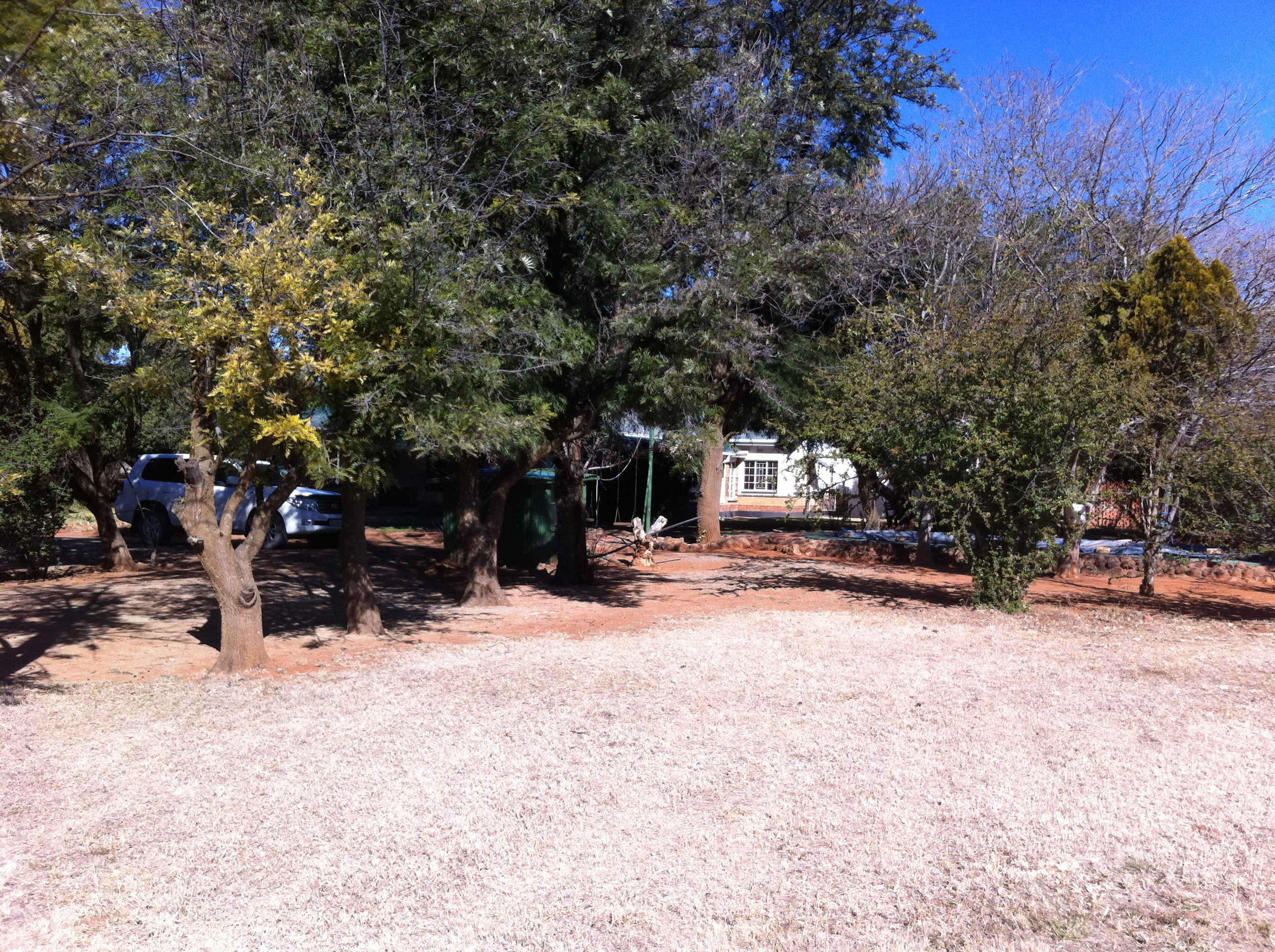
Dealesville

Dealesville is a mixed farming town in the Free State province of South Africa and is surrounded by numerous salt pans. There are many natural springs in the vicinity, most notably Florisbad some 35 km from the town.

The town was established on the farm Klipfontein (Afrikaans for Stone fountain), which was owned by John Henry Deale.

Town some 70 km north-west of Bloemfontein, 55 km south-east of Boshof and 111 km east of Kimberley on the R64 road. It was laid out on the farm Klipfontein and named after the owner, John Henry Deale. It was proclaimed a township in 1899 and achieved municipal status in 1914. The spas Baden-Baden and Florisbad are respectively 14 and 37 km from Dealesville.
