= Bain's Vlei =

- Location within Free State (South African province) Location within South Africa
- Coordinates: 29.057°S 26.131°E
- Country: South Africa
- Province: Free State
- Municipality: Mangaung
- Time zone: UTC+2 (SAST)
- PO box: 9338

Bain's Vlei is a settlement on the road to Kimberley, situated 8 km west of Bloemfontein. It is named after the owner, Andrew Hudson Bain, who bought it in 1849.

== Education ==
The Hoërskool President Steyn opened in 1930.
