= Bloemfontein High School =

Location
- Bloemfontein, Free State, 9301; South Africa
- Coordinates: 29.0847°S 26.2455°E

Information
- Motto: Waar elkeen iemand is
- Years offered: 8-12
- Gender: Female and Male
- Language: Afrikaans and English
- Hours in school day: 6 hours, 30 minutes
- Colours: Blue, White, Yellow
- Website: www.hsbfn.com

Bloemfontein High School (Afrikaans: Hoërskool Bloemfontein) is a secondary school in Bloemfontein, Free State, South Africa.

The school was named after Bloemfontein, the area in which it is located.
