= Baysvalley, Bloemfontein =

Baysvalley
- Location within Free State (South African province) Location within South Africa
- Coordinates: 29°4′48″S 26°13′25″E
- Country: South Africa
- Province: Free State
- Municipality: Mangaung
- Main Place: Bloemfontein

Area
  - Total: 0.44 km^{2} (0.17 sq mi)

Population (2011)
  - Total: 763
  - Density: 1,700/km^{2} (4,500/sq mi)

Racial makeup (2011)
  - Black African: 16.4%
  - Coloured: 1.2%
  - Indian/Asian: 2.5%
  - White: 79.2%
  - Other: 0.7%

First languages (2011)
  - Afrikaans: 66.3%
  - English: 21.5%
  - Sotho: 5.5%
  - Other: 6.7%
- Time zone: UTC+2 (SAST)

Baysvalley is an 80% white suburb of the city of Bloemfontein in South Africa.
