= Dan Pienaar, Bloemfontein =

Dan Pienaar
- Location within Free State (South African province) Location within South Africa
- Coordinates: 29.087°S 26.212°E
- Country: South Africa
- Province: Free State
- Municipality: Mangaung
- Main Place: Bloemfontein

Area
  - Total: 3.57 km^{2} (1.38 sq mi)

Population (2011)
  - Total: 5,606
  - Density: 1,570/km^{2} (4,070/sq mi)

Racial makeup (2011)
  - Black African: 12.1%
  - Coloured: 2.0%
  - Indian/Asian: 0.8%
  - White: 84.3%
  - Other: 0.8%

First languages (2011)
  - Afrikaans: 75.3%
  - English: 16.3%
  - Sotho: 3.9%
  - Other: 4.5%
- Time zone: UTC+2 (SAST)
- Postal code (street): n/a
- PO box: 9301
- Area code: 051

Dan Pienaar is a suburb of the city of Bloemfontein in South Africa.
