= R704 (South Africa) =

Regional route in South Africa

Regional route R704

Route information
- Length: 108 km (67 mi)

Major junctions
- North-west end: R48 at Koffiefontein
- R706 near Jagersfontein
- South-east end: R717 at Trompsburg

Location
- Country: South Africa

Highway system
- Numbered routes of South Africa
← R703	→ R705

The R704 is a regional route in Free State, South Africa that connects Koffiefontein with Trompsburg via Fauresmith and Jagersfontein.

== Route ==
Its north-western terminus is the R48 at Koffiefontein. The route heads south-east, and passes through the towns of Fauresmith and Jagersfontein. After Jagersfontein, it intersects with the south-western terminus of the R706. The route ends at Trompsburg, where it meets the R717.
