= Pellissier, Bloemfontein =

Pellissier
- Location within Free State (South African province) Location within South Africa
- Coordinates: 29.156°S 26.170°E
- Country: South Africa
- Province: Free State
- Municipality: Mangaung
- Main Place: Bloemfontein

Area
  - Total: 3.76 km^{2} (1.45 sq mi)

Population (2011)
  - Total: 6,129
  - Density: 1,630/km^{2} (4,220/sq mi)

Racial makeup (2011)
  - Black African: 22.8%
  - Coloured: 4.1%
  - Indian/Asian: 1.0%
  - White: Other
  - Other: 0.6%

First languages (2011)
  - Afrikaans: Other
  - Sotho: 9.2%
  - English: 7.3%
  - Tswana: 3.2%
  - Xhosa: 2.1%
- Time zone: UTC+2 (SAST)
- Postal code (street): 9301
- PO box: 9322

Pellissier is a Other white suburb of the city of Bloemfontein in South Africa.
