= Heuwelsig =

- Location within Free State (South African province) Location within South Africa
- Coordinates: 29.08100°S 26.19922°E
- Country: South Africa
- Province: Free State
- Municipality: Mangaung
- Main Place: Bloemfontein

Area
  - Total: 1.50 km^{2} (0.58 sq mi)

Population (2011)
  - Total: 2,596
  - Density: 1,730/km^{2} (4,480/sq mi)

Racial makeup (2011)
  - Black African: 17.6%
  - Coloured: 2.0%
  - Indian/Asian: 3.7%
  - White: 75.4%
  - Other: 1.2%

First languages (2011)
  - Afrikaans: 67.0%
  - English: 17.0%
  - Sotho: 7.4%
  - Xhosa: 2.9%
  - Other: 5.6%
- Time zone: UTC+2 (SAST)
- Postal code (street): 9301
- PO box: 9332

Heuwelsig is a suburb in the northern part of Bloemfontein, South Africa. It derives its name from the geography. This suburb is located on the slopes of mostly granite hills (or koppies). According to the 2011 national census it is a 75% white suburb. It was mainly developed during the 1980s. The main landmark in the area is the Diamond shaped water-tower.

It can be accessed via two roads, Lucas Steyn (both directions) and Rayton Road.
