= Doxa Deo Church =

- Location: Pretoria (Tshwane), Johannesburg, Bloemfontein, Charlotte, Durban, Port Elizabeth, Cape Town, London, Stuttgart, Auckland
- Country: United States, South Africa, United Kingdom, Germany, New Zealand
- Denomination: Pentecostal
- Website: www.doxadeo.org

History
- Status: Active
- Founded: 1996
- Founder: Alan Platt

Doxa Deo is a Pentecostal multi-site church with locations in South Africa, the United Kingdom, Germany, New Zealand, and the United States. While Alan Platt is the founder and father of Doxa Deo, leadership of the Church was publicly handed over to Jean and Willianna Symons at Doxa Deo's City Changers Conference in 2023. As of December 2023, there are 34 Doxa Deo campuses worldwide, with as many associated educational and non-profits. Doxa Deo serves a constituency of approximately 30,000 people. Doxa Deo Church is part of the Apostolic Faith Mission of South Africa, the Evangelical Alliance of South Africa, the Pioneer Network of London, and Die Stadtreformer in Germany.

== History ==
The church was founded by Alan Platt in 1996. The name Doxa Deo is a combination of two words from different languages. Doxa is the Greek word for “Glory” and Deo is the Latin word for “to God”.

The City Changers Institute (CCI) was established as part of the Doxa Deo family in the year 2009. The institute focuses on the need for training and developing City Changers on a formal level. The CCI focuses on multiple disciplines ranging from post-secondary, under as well as post graduate levels. Various formal programs are currently being presented, which include among others, Theological and Ministry, Education (primary and secondary), Master's – in Organizational Leadership, Strategic Foresight, and Business Administration (MBA).

A growing number of formal partnerships, both locally as well as internationally are key to the CCI functioning. Among these partnerships are the South African Theological Seminary, Regent University - United States, Ryan International Group of Institutions – India, and Xpand Leadership Consulting – Europe.

In 2015, it has 16 campuses in various cities.

== Ministries & Community Initiatives ==
Some of Doxa Deo's major initiatives include POPUP (People Upliftment Program), a non-profit organization that provides skills training for the unemployed. The International Review of Social Sciences and Humanities published a scientific study into the effectiveness of the POPUP Life Skills Program. POPUP have received accolades from the ACCA (Association of Chartered Certified Accountants) in the Pretoria News for their great corporate governance. Samsung Electronics South Africa has donated a large number of electronic products to POPUP. More than 150 products ranging from HDTVs and home theater systems through to ovens, dishwashers and PCs were donated.

Seven orphanages have been established focusing on various needs of the children concerned. The Makhulong Child and Youth Care Center, based at the Doxa Deo Edendale School care for maltreated and sexually abused children including AIDS orphans.

As an extension of the Doxa Deo vision to establish a model for Christ-centered education, the Doxa Deo Schools strive to grow children in God's love through a high caring educational environment. Since its inception the schools have experienced a 100% pass rate for all High School Seniors and form part of the Independent Examination Board. Doxa Deo has several education institutions.
