= Small nucleolar RNA R64/Z200 family =

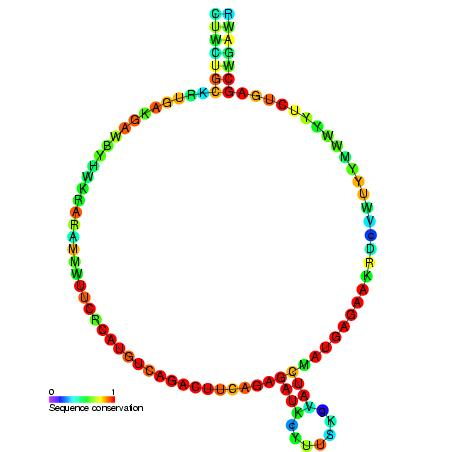
- Predicted secondary structure and sequence conservation of snoR64

Identifiers
- Symbol: snoR64
- Rfam: RF00267

Other data
- RNA type: Gene; snRNA; snoRNA; CD-box
- Domain: Eukaryota
- GO: GO:0006396 GO:0005730
- SO: SO:0000593
- PDB structures: PDBe

In molecular biology, R64/Z200 is a member of the C/D class of small nucleolar RNA which guide the site-specific 2'-O-methylation of substrate RNA. This family can be found in Arabidopsis thaliana (R64) and Oryza sativa (Z200).
