= R705 (South Africa) =

Regional route in South Africa

Regional route R705

Route information
- Length: 53 km (33 mi)

Major junctions
- South end: Koffiefontein, Free State
- N12 near Ritchie
- North end: Ritchie, Northern Cape

Location
- Country: South Africa

Highway system
- Numbered routes of South Africa
← R704	→ R706

The R705 is a Regional Route in South Africa.

== Route ==
Its north-western terminus is the N12 near Ritchie, Northern Cape. The route head south-east, crossing into Free State. It passes through Jacobsdal, and ends its route at an intersection with the R48, near Koffiefontein.
