= Generaal De Wet, Bloemfontein =

Generaal De Wet
- Location within Free State (South African province) Location within South Africa
- Coordinates: 29.145°S 26.202°E
- Country: South Africa
- Province: Free State
- Municipality: Mangaung
- Main Place: Bloemfontein

Government
  - Councillor: 7

Area
  - Total: 2.21 km^{2} (0.85 sq mi)

Population (2011)
  - Total: 2,627
  - Density: 1,190/km^{2} (3,080/sq mi)

Racial makeup (2011)
  - Black African: 20.1%
  - Coloured: 3.1%
  - Indian/Asian: 0.1%
  - White: 76.3%
  - Other: 0.4%

First languages (2011)
  - Afrikaans: 78.4%
  - Sotho: 6.7%
  - English: 9.0%
  - Xhosa: 2.8%
  - Other: 3.1%
- Time zone: UTC+2 (SAST)
- Postal code (street): 9301

Generaal De Wet is a 76% white suburb of the city of Bloemfontein in South Africa.
