= Westdene, Bloemfontein =

Westdene
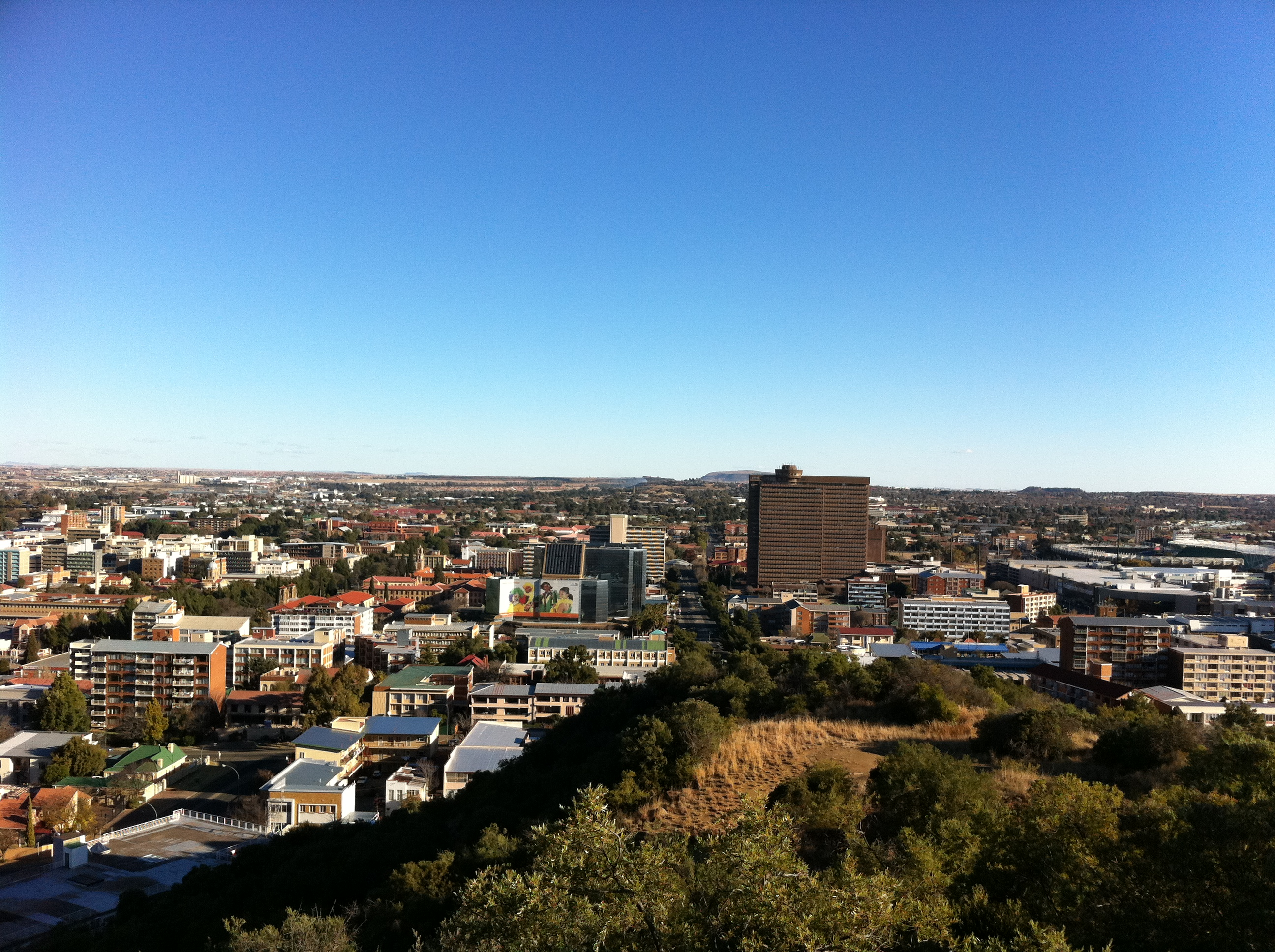
- Panorama of Westdene

- Location within Free State (South African province) Location within South Africa
- Coordinates: 29.107°S 26.211°E
- Country: South Africa
- Province: Free State
- Municipality: Mangaung
- Main Place: Bloemfontein

Area
  - Total: 1.75 km^{2} (0.68 sq mi)

Population (2011)
  - Total: 4,117
  - Density: 2,350/km^{2} (6,090/sq mi)

Racial makeup (2011)
  - Black African: 42.1%
  - Coloured: 6.1%
  - Indian/Asian: 2.0%
  - White: 49.0%
  - Other: 0.8%

First languages (2011)
  - Afrikaans: 48.7%
  - Sotho: 18.9%
  - English: 15.7%
  - Tswana: 5.7%
  - Other: 11.0%
- Time zone: UTC+2 (SAST)
- Postal code (street): 9332
- PO box: 9301

Westdene is a suburb of the city of Bloemfontein in South Africa.
