= Fleurdal =

- Location within Free State (South African province) Location within South Africa
- Coordinates: 29.157°S 26.195°E
- Country: South Africa
- Province: Free State
- Municipality: Mangaung
- Main Place: Bloemfontein

Area
  - Total: 1.10 km^{2} (0.42 sq mi)

Population (2011)
  - Total: 2,198
  - Density: 2,000/km^{2} (5,180/sq mi)

Racial makeup (2011)
  - Black African: 18.6%
  - Coloured: 1.0%
  - White: 79.0%
  - Other: 1.4%

First languages (2011)
  - Afrikaans: 76.5%
  - Sotho: 8.1%
  - English: 7.3%
  - Tswana: 2.8%
  - Other: 5.3%
- Time zone: UTC+2 (SAST)
- Postal code (street): 9301

Fleurdal is a suburb of the city of Bloemfontein in South Africa.
