= Petrusburg =

- Location within Free State (South African province) Location within South Africa
- Coordinates: 29°07′S 25°25′E
- Country: South Africa
- Province: Free State
- District: Xhariep
- Municipality: Letsemeng
- Established: 1891

Area
  - Total: 16.85 km^{2} (6.51 sq mi)

Population (2011)
  - Total: 944
  - Density: 56.0/km^{2} (145/sq mi)

Racial makeup (2011)
  - White: 68.01%
  - Black African: 23.62%
  - Coloured: 6.78%
  - Indian/Asian: 0.74%
  - Other: 0.85%

First languages (2011)
  - Afrikaans: 84.45%
  - Tswana: 4.63%
  - Xhosa: 3.59%
  - English: 2.09%
  - Other: 5.24%
- Time zone: UTC+2 (SAST)
- Postal code (street): 9932
- PO box: 9932
- Area code: 053

Petrusburg is a small mixed farming town in the Free State province of South Africa. It started out as a Dutch Reformed Church serving the farms in 1891. When it became a town, it was originally started on a farm close to "Emmaus", a railway station on the line between Bloemfontein and Kimberley. The original foundations are still there, but they ran out of water, and had to move to the present location where a strong fountain was available. So much so that the first houses had free running water from the fountain for irrigation. The town was named after Petrus Albertus Venter, whose farm, Diepfontein, provided the original land. It is situated on the N8 National Route between Bloemfontein (80 km east) and Kimberley (80 km west).

Every year in March, a big music festival is held called the Aartappelfees (Potato Festival). The main street in town is Pretorius Street, but the busiest street is Ossewa street.

A. J. C. Jooste High School is a coeducational boarding high school. Together with the associated primary school it is known as the AJC Jooste Combined School.

The town is facing significant poverty issues, with a substantial number of its population unemployed. The agricultural sector is the primary source of employment in the area.

The town's squatter camp, Bolokanang, is home to around 8,300 people, with Boiketlo Street being the main point of entry to the area.
