= Noordhoek, Bloemfontein =

Noordhoek
- Location within Free State (South African province) Location within South Africa
- Coordinates: 29.089°S 26.251°E
- Country: South Africa
- Province: Free State
- Municipality: Mangaung
- Main Place: Bloemfontein

Area
  - Total: 1.45 km^{2} (0.56 sq mi)

Population (2011)
  - Total: 2,128
  - Density: 1,470/km^{2} (3,800/sq mi)

Racial makeup (2011)
  - Black African: 22.8%
  - Coloured: 7.0%
  - Indian/Asian: 0.9%
  - White: 68.3%
  - Other: 1.0%

First languages (2011)
  - Afrikaans: 70.2%
  - Sotho: 11.3%
  - English: 10.6%
  - Tswana: 2.5%
  - Other: 5.4%
- Time zone: UTC+2 (SAST)
- PO box: 9301

Noordhoek is a 68% white suburb of the city of Bloemfontein in South Africa.
