= Langenhoven Park =

- Location within Free State (South African province) Location within South Africa
- Coordinates: 29.093°S 26.162°E
- Country: South Africa
- Province: Free State
- Municipality: Mangaung
- Main Place: Bloemfontein

Area
  - Total: 5.21 km^{2} (2.01 sq mi)

Population (2011)
  - Total: 11,368
  - Density: 2,180/km^{2} (5,650/sq mi)

Racial makeup (2011)
  - Black African: 11.2%
  - Coloured: 2.4%
  - Indian/Asian: 1.6%
  - White: 83.9%
  - Other: 0.9%

First languages (2011)
  - Afrikaans: 79.9%
  - English: 12.1%
  - Sotho: 3.7%
  - Tswana: 1.3%
  - Other: 3.0%
- Time zone: UTC+2 (SAST)

Langenhoven Park is a large suburb in the city of Bloemfontein in South Africa.
