= Hospitaalpark =

- Location within Free State (South African province) Location within South Africa
- Coordinates: 29.140°S 26.194°E
- Country: South Africa
- Province: Free State
- Municipality: Mangaung
- Main Place: Bloemfontein

Area
  - Total: 1.36 km^{2} (0.53 sq mi)

Population (2011)
  - Total: 2,923
  - Density: 2,150/km^{2} (5,570/sq mi)

First languages (2011)
  - Afrikaans: 84.4%
  - English: 8.5%
  - Sotho: 3.6%
  - Tswana: 1.1%
  - Other: 2.4%
- Time zone: UTC+2 (SAST)
- Postal code (street): 9301

'Hospitaalpark All the street names are named after people who contributed to medicine.
