= Wilgehof, Bloemfontein =

Wilgehof
- Location within Free State (South African province) Location within South Africa
- Coordinates: 29.129°S 26.185°E
- Country: South Africa
- Province: Free State
- Municipality: Mangaung
- Main Place: Bloemfontein

Area
  - Total: 1.81 km^{2} (0.70 sq mi)

Population (2011)
  - Total: 3,896
  - Density: 2,150/km^{2} (5,570/sq mi)

Racial makeup (2011)
  - Black African: 11.2%
  - Coloured: 3.0%
  - Indian/Asian: 0.2%
  - White: 85.2%
  - Other: 0.6%

First languages (2011)
  - Afrikaans: 86.7%
  - English: 5.9%
  - Sotho: 3.8%
  - Xhosa: 1.4%
  - Other: 2.2%
- Time zone: UTC+2 (SAST)
- Postal code (street): 9332
- PO box: 9301
- Area code: 051

Wilgehof is a suburb of the city of Bloemfontein in South Africa.
