= Gardenia Park =

- Location within Free State (South African province) Location within South Africa
- Coordinates: 29.130°S 26.171°E
- Country: South Africa
- Province: Free State
- Municipality: Mangaung
- Main Place: Bloemfontein

Area
  - Total: 1.12 km^{2} (0.43 sq mi)

Population (2011)
  - Total: 1,633
  - Density: 1,460/km^{2} (3,780/sq mi)

Racial makeup (2011)
  - Black African: 6.1%
  - Coloured: 3.3%
  - White: 90.2%
  - Other: 0.4%

First languages (2011)
  - Afrikaans: 88.5%
  - English: 6.5%
  - Sotho: 3.4%
  - Other: 1.6%
- Time zone: UTC+2 (SAST)
- Postal code (street): 9301
- Area code: 051

Gardenia Park suburb is a popular green space of the city of Bloemfontein in South Africa.
