= Arboretum, Bloemfontein =

Arboretum
- Location within Free State (South African province) Location within South Africa
- Coordinates: 29°6′9″S 26°13′14″E
- Country: South Africa
- Province: Free State
- Municipality: Mangaung
- Main Place: Bloemfontein

Area
  - Total: 0.86 km^{2} (0.33 sq mi)

Population (2011)
  - Total: 266
  - Density: 310/km^{2} (800/sq mi)

Racial makeup (2011)
  - Black African: 16.9%
  - Coloured: 7.5%
  - White: 75.2%

First languages (2011)
  - Afrikaans: 67.7%
  - English: 16.5%
  - Sotho: 10.5%
  - Tswana: 2.6%
  - Other: 2.7%
- Time zone: UTC+2 (SAST)
- Postal code (street): 9305
- PO box: 9301
- Area code: 051

Arboretum is a suburb of the city of Bloemfontein in South Africa.
