= Soetdoring Nature Reserve =

Nature reserve in Free State, South Africa

Coordinates: 28°48′40″S 26°06′30″E

Soetdoring Nature Reserve is a nature reserve in Free State, South Africa. It covers approximately 75 square kilometres (29 sq mi). The Modder River passes through it. It is currently closed to the public.
