= Fauna, Bloemfontein =

Fauna
- Location within Free State (South African province) Location within South Africa
- Coordinates: 29.167°S 26.188°E
- Country: South Africa
- Province: Free State
- Municipality: Mangaung
- Main Place: Bloemfontein

Area
  - Total: 1.69 km^{2} (0.65 sq mi)

Population (2011)
  - Total: 4,576
  - Density: 2,710/km^{2} (7,010/sq mi)

Racial makeup (2011)
  - Black African: 44.6%
  - Coloured: 5.8%
  - Indian/Asian: 0.9%
  - White: 48.3%
  - Other: 0.3%

First languages (2011)
  - Afrikaans: 52.5%
  - Sotho: 19.3%
  - English: 10.8%
  - Tswana: 8.2%
  - Other: 9.2%
- Time zone: UTC+2 (SAST)
- Postal code (street): 9301

Fauna is a suburb of the city of Bloemfontein in South Africa.
