= Willows, Bloemfontein =

Willows
- Location within Free State (South African province) Location within South Africa
- Coordinates: 29.121°S 26.204°E
- Country: South Africa
- Province: Free State
- Municipality: Mangaung
- Main Place: Bloemfontein

Area
  - Total: 2.42 km^{2} (0.93 sq mi)

Population (2011)
  - Total: 6,150
  - Density: 2,540/km^{2} (6,580/sq mi)

Racial makeup (2011)
  - Black African: 74.0%
  - Coloured: 10.2%
  - Indian/Asian: 1.2%
  - White: 14.2%
  - Other: 0.3%

First languages (2011)
  - Sotho: 33.1%
  - Afrikaans: 23.1%
  - English: 15.3%
  - Tswana: 11.6%
  - Other: 16.9%
- Time zone: UTC+2 (SAST)
- Postal code (street): 9301
- PO box: 9320

Willows is a suburb of Bloemfontein. It housed the first post office which was built in Bloemfontein. The post office was built in King Edward Drive, and most young people would know it as King Edward Cafe, however due to communication gaps, King Edward Cafe was demolished in 2006, to make space for residential flats.
