= Bloemfontein =

Judicial capital of South Africa

Bloemfontein: Mangaung (Setswana); ǀʼAuxa ǃXās (ǃOrakobab)
- Capital city (judicial branch)
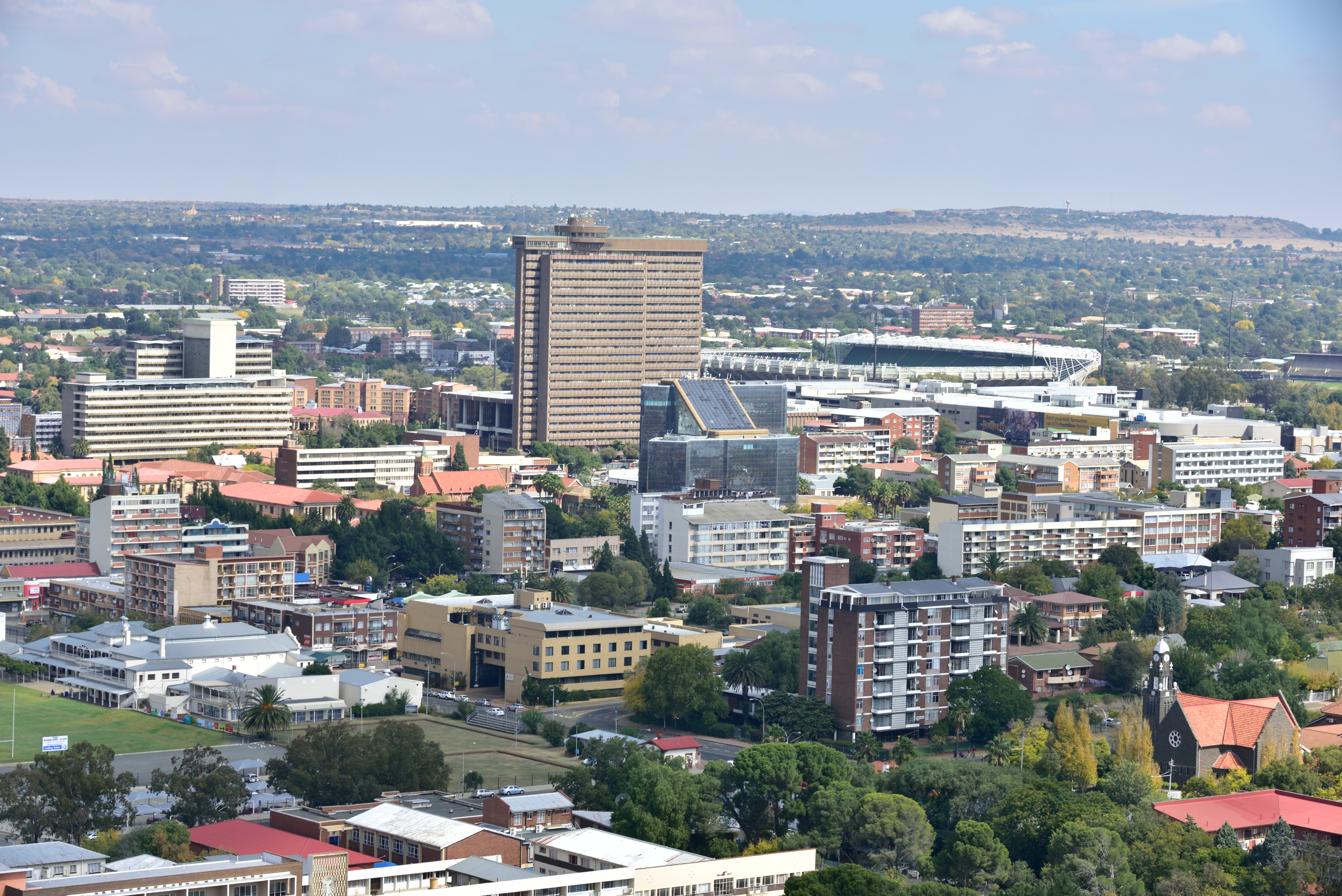
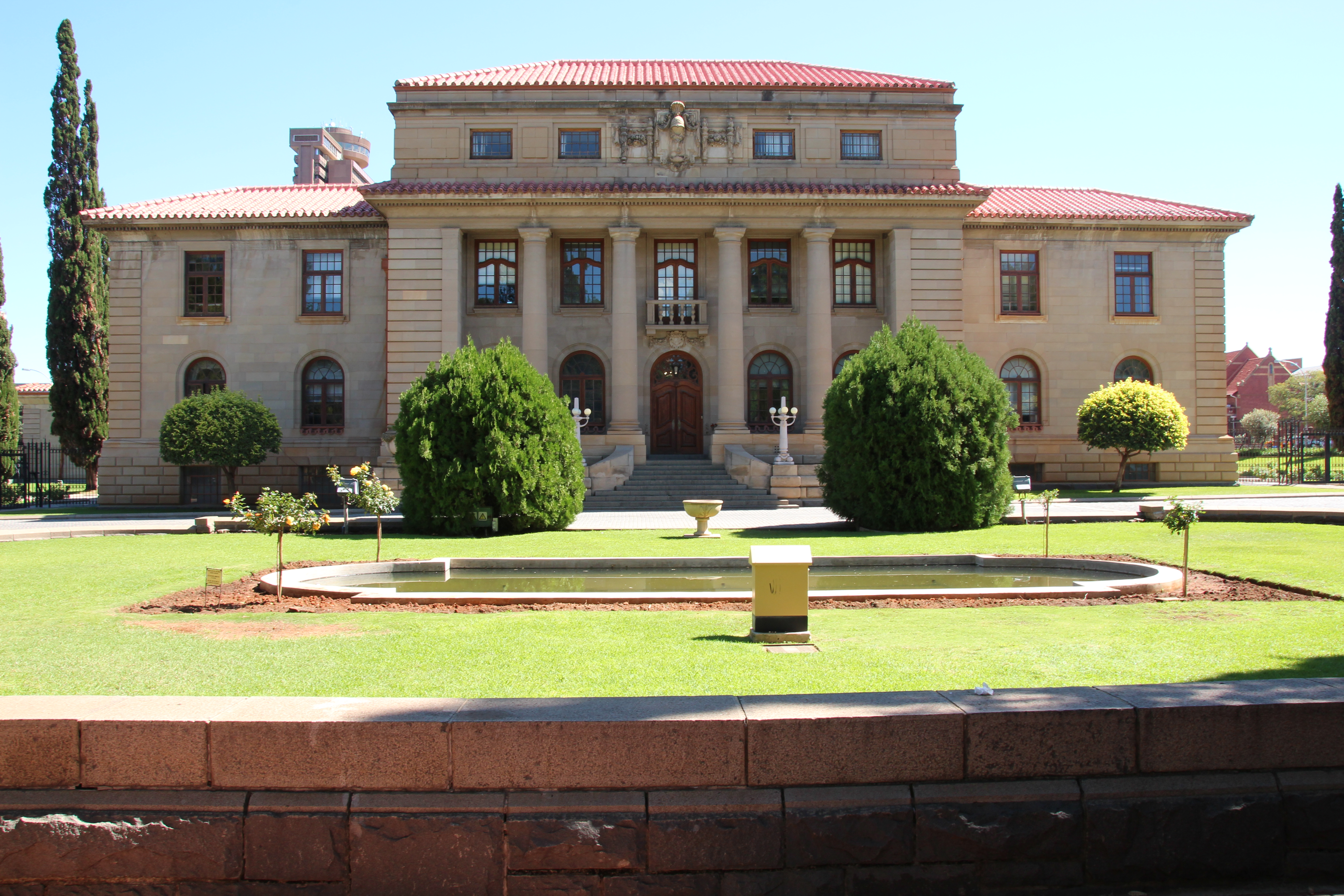
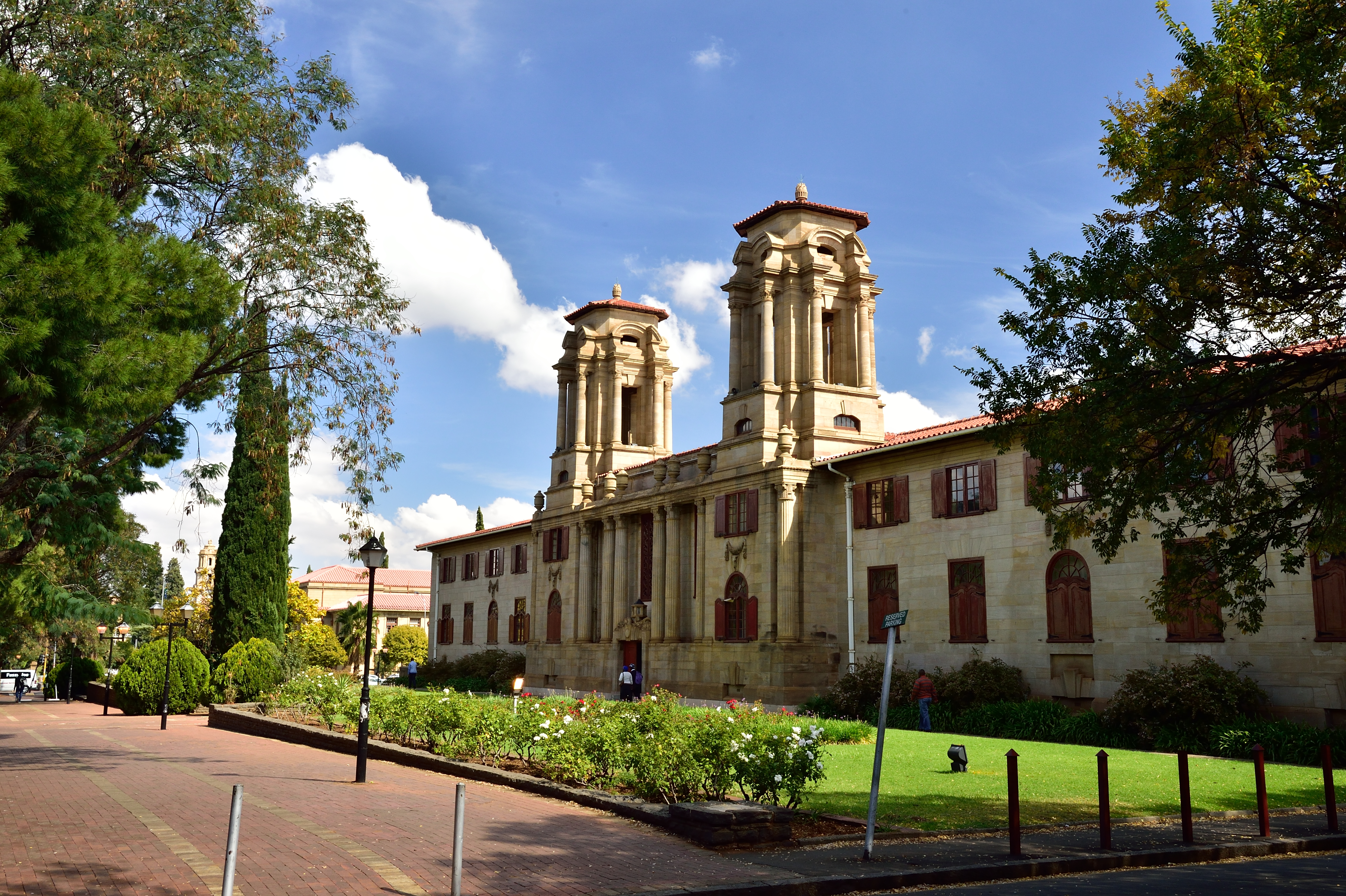
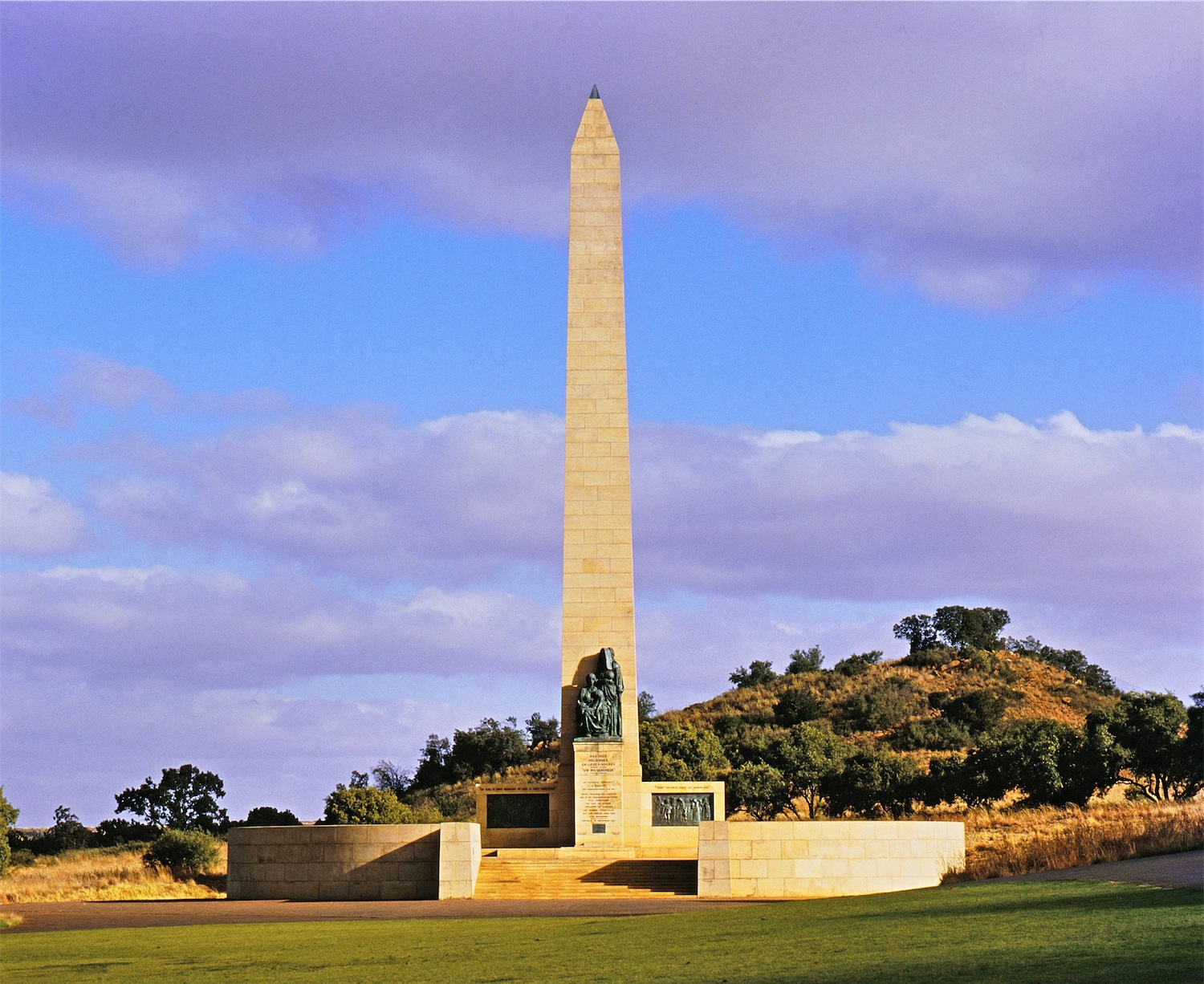
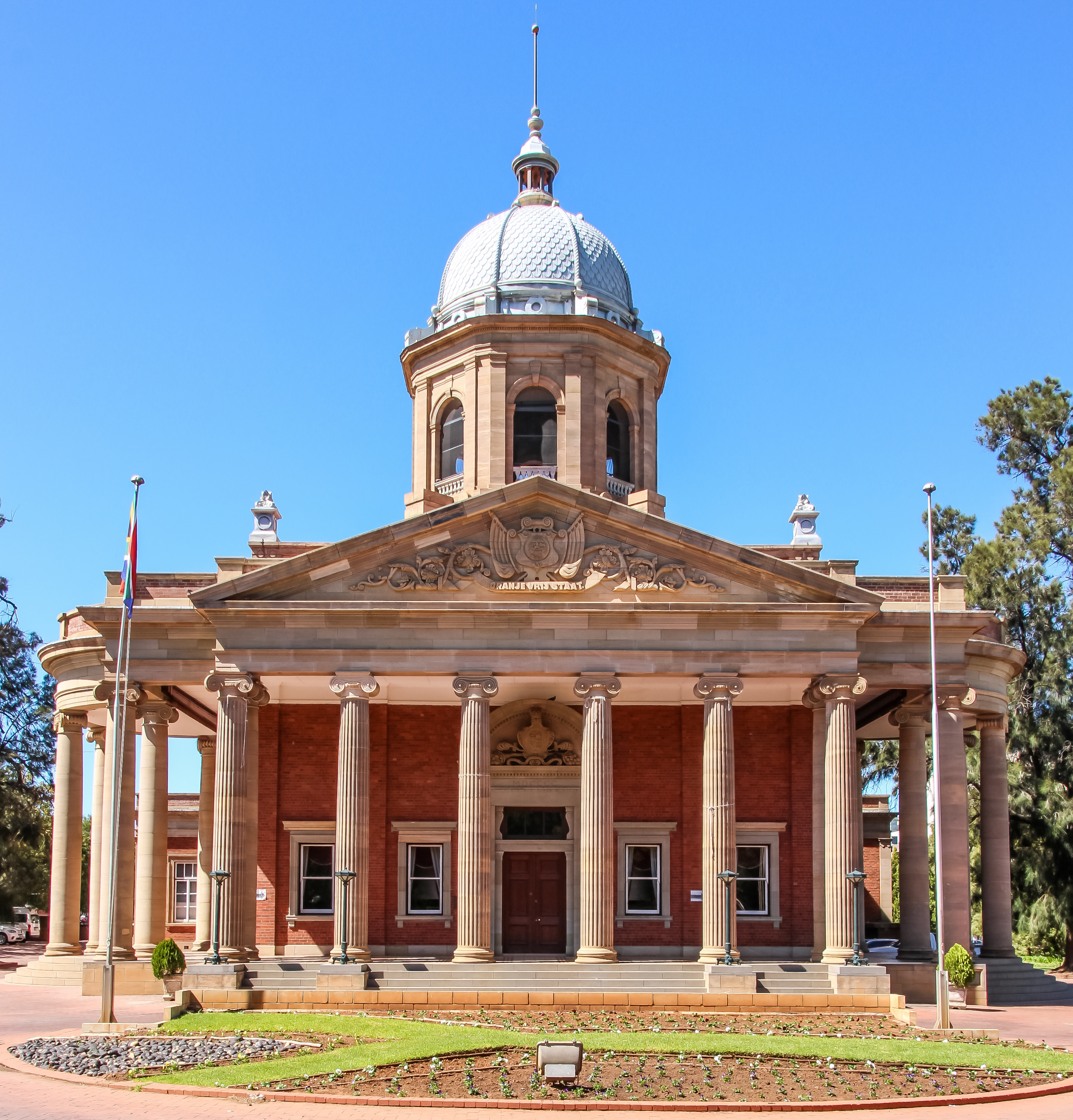
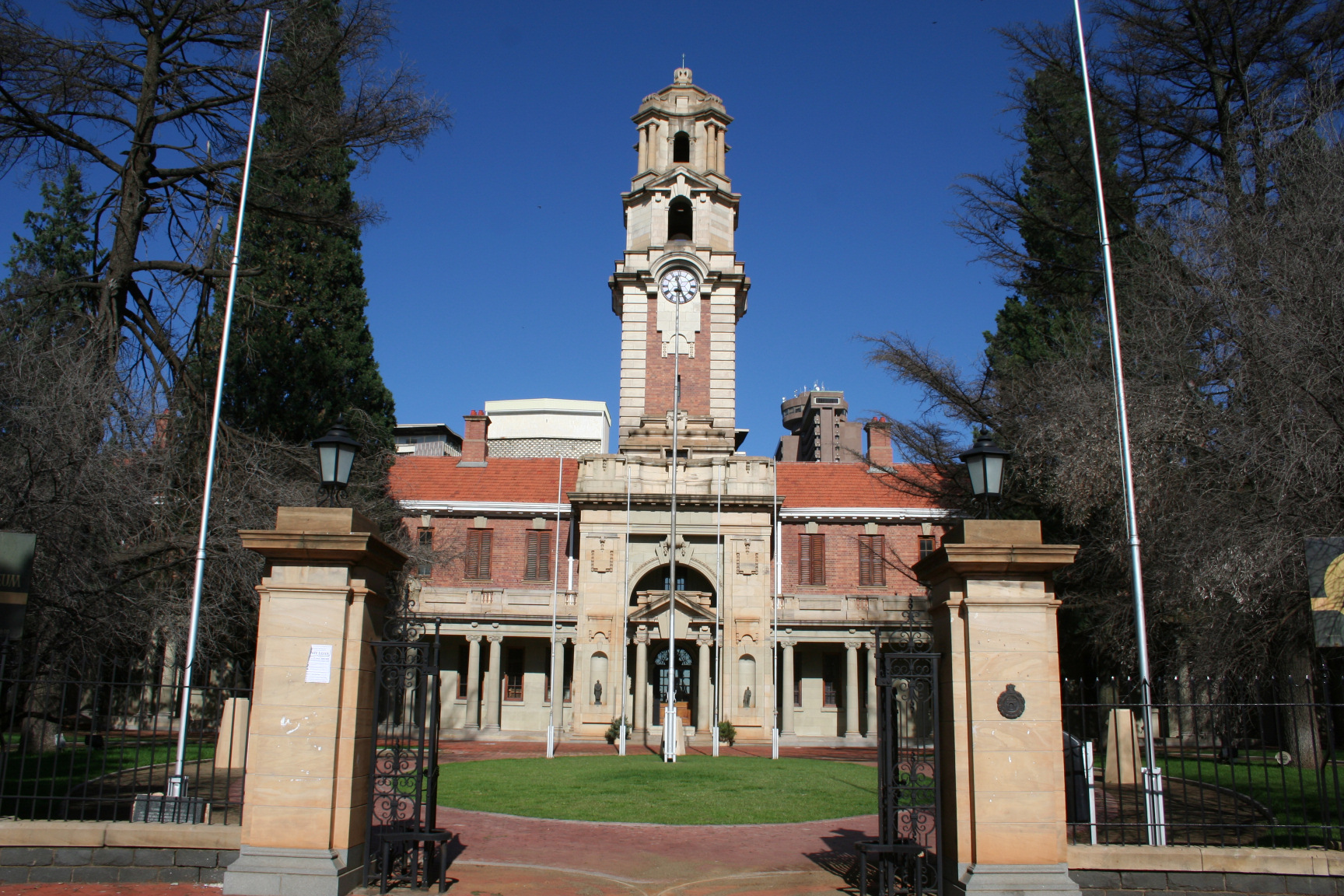
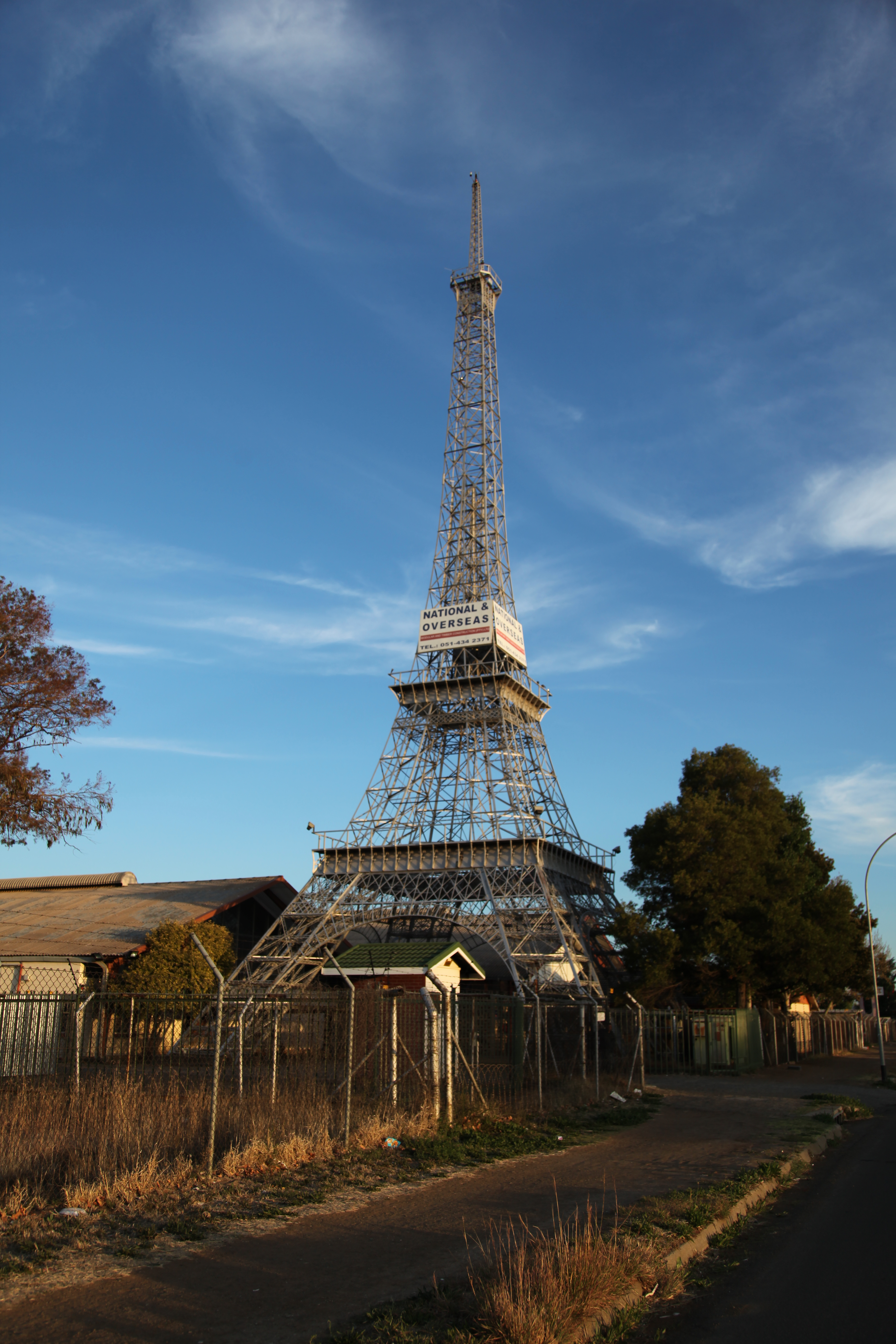
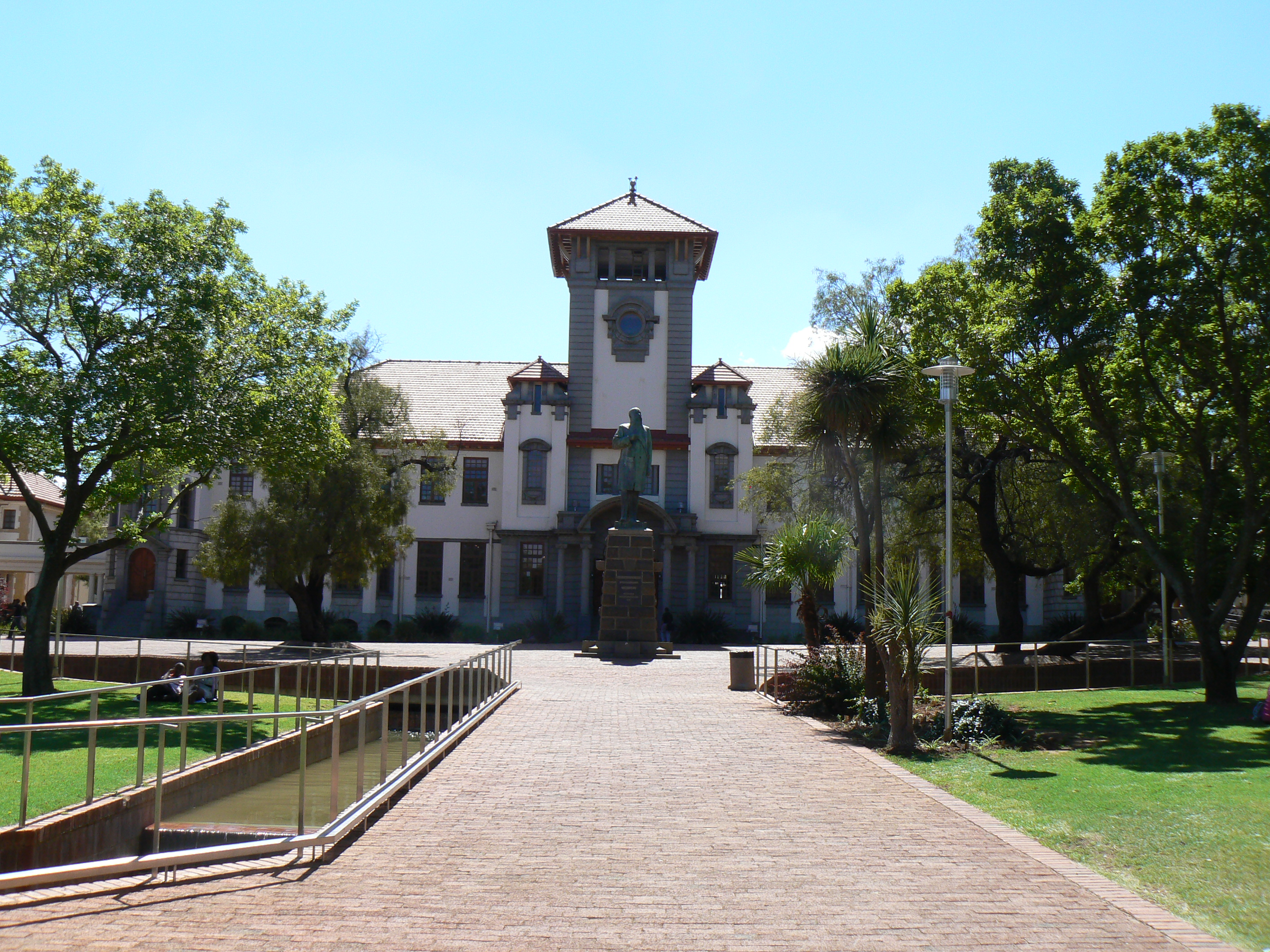
- Skyline of Bloemfontein Supreme Court of Appeal Bloemfontein City Hall National Women's Monument Obelisk Fourth Raadsaal National Afrikaans Literary Museum and Research Centre Replica of the Eiffel Tower University of the Free State

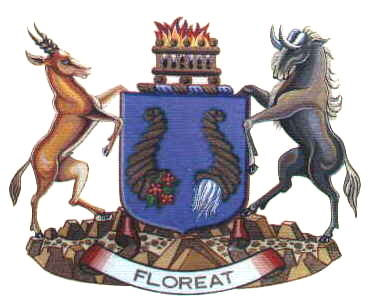
- Coat of arms
- Nickname: City of Roses
- Motto: "Floreat" ("Flourish")
- Location within Free State (South African province) Location within South Africa Location within Africa
- Coordinates: 29°07′S 26°13′E
- Country: South Africa
- Province: Free State
- Municipality: Mangaung
- Established: 1846

Government
  - Type: Metropolitan municipality
  - Mayor: Gregory Nthatisi (ANC)

Area
  - Capital city (judicial branch): 236.17 km^{2} (91.19 sq mi)
  - Metro: 6,283.99 km^{2} (2,426.26 sq mi)
- Elevation: 1,395 m (4,577 ft)

Population (2011)
  - Capital city (judicial branch): 256,185
  - Density: 1,084.7/km^{2} (2,809.5/sq mi)
  - Metro: 747,431
  - Metro density: 118.942/km^{2} (308.059/sq mi)

Racial makeup (2011)
  - Black: 56.1%
  - White: 29.8%
  - Coloured: 12.8%
  - Indian/Asian: 0.8%
  - Other: 0.5%

First languages (2011)
  - Afrikaans: 42.5%
  - Sotho: 33.4%
  - Tswana: 9.5%
  - English: 7.5%
  - Xhosa: 7.1%
- Time zone: UTC+2 (SAST)
- Postal code (street): 9300
- PO box: 9301
- Area code: 051
- HDI (2012): ▲0.860 very high
- Water Hardness: Level 3 (average)
- Website: mangaung.co.za

Bloemfontein (/ˈbluːmfɒnteɪn/ BLOOM-fon-tayn; Afrikaans: [ˈblumfɔntəin]), also known as Bloem, is the capital and the largest city of the Free State province in South Africa. It is often, and has been traditionally, referred to as the country's "judicial capital", as it hosts the Supreme Court of Appeal, alongside the legislative capital Cape Town and executive capital Pretoria. However, the highest court in South Africa, the Constitutional Court, has been in Johannesburg since 1994.

Situated at an elevation of 1,395 m (4,577 ft) above sea level, the city of 256,185 residents (as of 2011) has Mangaung as its municipality, which has a population of 747,431.

The city of Bloemfontein contains the Franklin Game Reserve, Naval Hill, the Maselspoort Resort and the Sand du Plessis Theatre. The city hosts numerous museums, including the National Women's Monument, the Anglo-Boer War Museum, the National Museum, and the Oliewenhuis Art Museum. Bloemfontein also hosts the first digital planetarium in the southern hemisphere, the Naval Hill Planetarium, and Boyden Observatory, an astronomical research observatory.

Bloemfontein is popularly and poetically known as "the city of roses" for its abundance of these flowers and the annual rose festival held there. The city is situated in the middle of the country; hence it is referred to as "Central South Africa". The city's Sesotho name is Mangaung, meaning "place of cheetahs". It was one of the host cities for the 2010 FIFA World Cup.

== History ==
=== Early history ===
Though historically a !Orana and Barolong settlement, and then a Boer settlement, Bloemfontein was officially founded in 1846 as a fort by British Army major Henry Douglas Warden as a British outpost in the Transoranje region, at that stage occupied by various groups of peoples including!Orana (so-called "Korana" of the ǀHõaǁʼaes, ǀHũdiǁʼaes, Einiǁʼaes, and others), Cape Colony Trekboers, Griqua (at that time known as "Baasters") and Barolong.

Warden initially chose the site primarily because of its proximity to the main route to Winburg, the spacious open country, and the absence of horse sickness. Bloemfontein was the original farm of Johannes Nicolaas Brits, born on 21 February 1790, owner and first inhabitant of Bloemfontein. Johann – as he was known – sold the farm to Major Warden. He later bought what would later become the town of Brits, North West.

With colonial policy shifts, the region changed into the Orange River Sovereignty (1848–1854) and eventually the Orange Free State Republic (1854–1902). From 1902 to 1910, it served as the capital of the Orange River Colony and since that time as the provincial capital of the Free State. In 1910, it became the Judicial capital of the Union of South Africa. A possible etymology for the city's name is that it is called Bloemfontein lit. "Bloem's fountain", after Jan Bloem II, a Griqua leader.

=== Orange Free State (1854–1902) ===
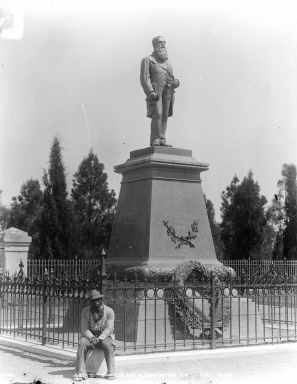
Early 20th century photo of a statue of the 19th century President Johannes Brand of the Orange Free State

The Orange Free State was an independent Boer Republic in southern Africa during the second half of the 19th century. Extending between the Orange and Vaal rivers, its borders were determined by the United Kingdom of Great Britain and Ireland in 1848 when the region was proclaimed as the Orange River Sovereignty, with a seat of a British Resident in Bloemfontein.

As the capital of the Orange Free State Republic, the growth and maturing of the republic resulted in the development of Bloemfontein. The city constructed numerous public buildings that remain in use today, facilitated by the republic's governance and compensation from the British for the loss of the diamond-rich Griqua Land area. The old Orange Free State's presidential residence, the Old Presidency, is currently a museum and cultural space in the city.

A railway line was built in 1890 connecting Bloemfontein to Cape Town. The railway line provided a centrally located railway station and proved critical to the British in occupying the city later.

The writer J. R. R. Tolkien was born in the city on 3 January 1892. However, his family left Orange Free State (now Free State province, South Africa) following the death of his father, Arthur Tolkien, when Tolkien was three (1895). He recorded that his earliest memories were of "a hot country".

In 1899, the city was the site of the Bloemfontein Conference, which failed to prevent the outbreak of the Second Boer War. The conference was a final attempt to avert a war between Britain and the South African Republic, and its failure set the stage for war, which broke out on 11 October 1899.

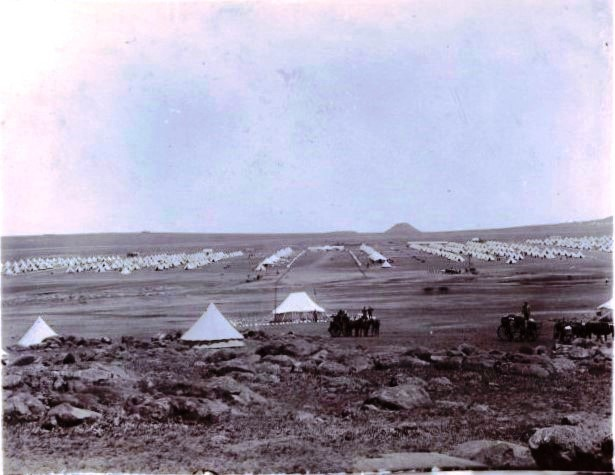
The British concentration camp of Bloemfontein.

On 13 March 1900, following the Battle of Paardeberg, the British captured the city and built a concentration camp nearby to house Boer women and children. In 1913, the National Women's Monument was constructed on the outskirts of the city to commemorate all Boer civilians who died in concentration camps during the war.

The hill in town was named Naval Hill after the naval guns brought in by the British to fortify the position against attack.

=== Unionisation of South Africa (1910s) ===
On 31 May 1910, exactly eight years after the Boers signed the Peace Treaty of Vereeniging that ended the Anglo-Boer War between the British Empire and two Boer states, the South African Republic (Republic of Transvaal) and the Orange Free State, South Africa became a Union.

Due to disagreements over where the Union's capital should be, a compromise was reached that allowed Bloemfontein to host Appellate Division and become the Union's judicial capital. Bloemfontein was also given financial compensation.

On 8 January 1912, the South African Native National Congress (SANNC) was founded in Bloemfontein. The Union of South Africa had not granted rights to black South Africans, causing the organisation's creation. Its primary aim was to fight for the rights of black South Africans. During the implementation of pass laws, the city saw major demonstrations that forced South African authorities to exempt women from them for nearly four decades.

From 1 to 9 January 1914, James Barry Munnik Hertzog and his supporters met in Bloemfontein to form the National Party of the Orange Free State, and to lay down its principles, following Hertzog's exit from the South African Party in 1913. The National Party grew to govern South Africa in 1948 and implement the policy of racial segregation known as apartheid.

=== Apartheid era (1948–1994) ===
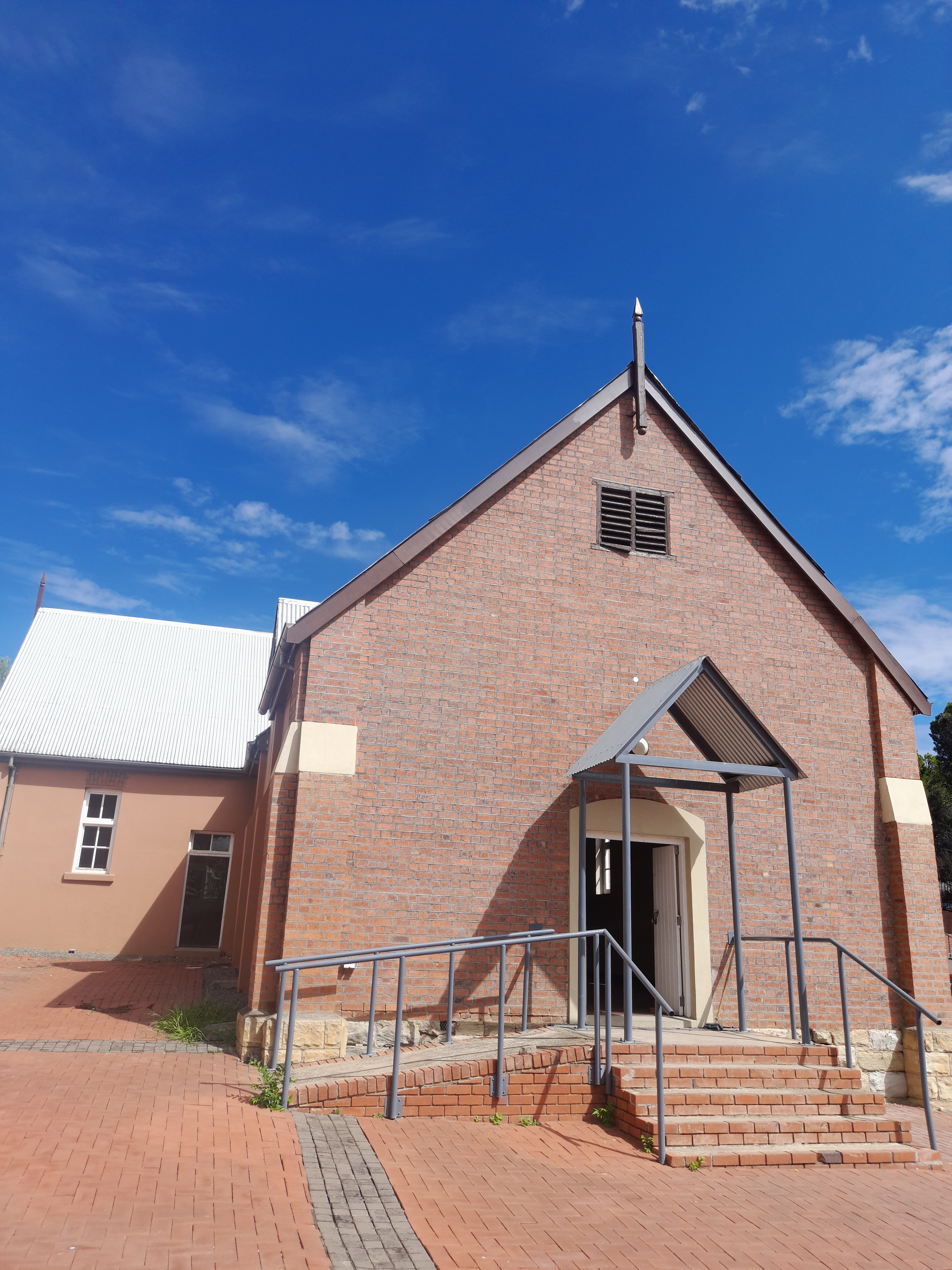
Waaihoek Wesleyan Church, World Heritage Site (2025)

When the National Party won the 1948 South African national government elections, they began implementing the policy known as apartheid. The policy was built on separate development of ethnic groups, and racial segregation was enforced. In Bloemfontein, residential segregation had begun in the 19th century with the passing of Ordinance 1 of 1860, which determined that no non-white, without written permission from the landlord (British government), had the right to occupy urban land in towns where local municipalities did not yet exist. On 3 June 1861, the council demarcated three locations in the following areas; the black population was to move to the area that lay to the right of a neighbourhood that was known as Kaffirfontein, Coloureds were to move to the Waaihoek Black residential area on the eastern outskirts of the town. The inhabitants of these settlements had to pay the so-called hut tax and grazing rights tax. This laid the foundation for the implementation of residential urban segregation as envisaged by the architects of apartheid.

When the South African apartheid government passed the Group Areas Act of 1950, the Bloemfontein municipality put into effect changes in the racial set-up of the city. The municipality demolished the Cape Stands residential area, which was occupied by the city's coloured population, and moved the residents to Heidedal. However, due to Coloureds living in such proximity to black people, intermarriages across racial lines occurred, resulting in a partially mixed population in Heidedal and Mangaung. In 1952, the Bloemfontein municipality began building new residential areas for the city's black population. New residential areas to separate ethnic groups such as Sotho, Xhosa and Tswana were formed. The residential areas were jointly known as Mangaung. Phahameng, a Sotho township, was the first formal housing projects to be approved by the municipality in 1956. Physical buffers such as the railway line and roads were put into place to separate black ethnic groups, the white and coloured population. Eleven thousand housing structures, of which approximately 6,000 were government-built rental accommodations, were erected in Mangaung between 1952 and 1968.

In 1968, Mangaung faced severe housing shortages when as many as 3,000 to 6,000 housing units were needed. To counter this problem, a 55 km eastward expansion called Botshabelo was added in 1979. The Bloemfontein municipality channelled off all black urbanisation to Thaba 'Nchu and Botshabelo, which were developed as a source of cheap labour for the city of Bloemfontein. A subsidised bus service was established, and Botshabelo was declared a decentralisation point, meaning it was designated to become an industrial development point to reduce the distance between the place of employment and the place of residence.

In 1988, approximately 14,500 people were commuting daily between Botshabelo and Bloemfontein. This meant that 55% of Botshabelo's workforce was employed outside the city. In 1994, after the disestablishment of the apartheid government, Bloemfontein, Botshabelo, and Thaba Nchu became part of Motheo District Municipality. The Motheo District Municipality was disestablished on 18 May 2011, and Mangaung was upgraded to become an autonomous metropolitan municipality with Bloemfontein as the main seat.

=== Since 1994 ===
Until 1994, the city was South Africa's sole judicial capital. It remains the seat for the Supreme Court of Appeal (formerly the Appellate Division of the Supreme Court). The city is also an administrative centre with many private hospitals and educational institutions.

== Government ==
Free State Provincial Government building Bloemfontein forms part of the Mangaung Metropolitan Municipality, which was upgraded from a Local Municipality in 2011.

The Mangaung Metropolitan Municipality elects a municipal council for five-year periods through a mixed-member proportional representation (MMP) system in which wards elect individual councillors alongside those named from party lists. Voters get two votes: one for a representative to become a ward councillor and the other for a political party. The latter vote distributes seats in the municipal council amongst parties, while the former distributes seats through the individual representatives.

== Geography ==
Bloemfontein is located in central South Africa on the southern edge of the Highveld at an elevation of 1,400 metres (4,600 ft), bordering on the semi-arid region of the Karoo. The area is generally flat with occasional hills ("koppies" in Afrikaans), and the general vegetation is Highveld grassland.

=== Climate ===
Bloemfontein

Climate chart (precipitation, max. and min. temperature)
J	F	M	A	M	J	J	A	S	O	N	D
83 31 15	111 30 15	72 28 12	56 24 7	17 21 2	12 18 −2	8 18 −2	15 21 0	24 25 5	43 27 9	58 29 11	60 31 14
- █ Average max. and min. temperatures in °C
- █ Precipitation totals in mm
- Source: SAWS
Imperial conversion
J	F	M	A	M	J	J	A	S	O	N	D
3.3 88 59	4.4 86 59	2.8 82 54	2.2 75 45	0.7 70 36	0.5 64 28	0.3 64 28	0.6 70 32	0.9 77 41	1.7 81 48	2.3 84 52	2.4 88 57
- █ Average max. and min. temperatures in °F
- █ Precipitation totals in inches

Bloemfontein experiences a cold semi-arid climate (Köppen BSk), with hot summer days and cool, dry winters with frosty nights. Rainfall usually arrives in the summer months, often in the form of dramatic but short-lived afternoon/evening thunderstorms that serve as a temporary relief from the heat. The city tends to be dry and dusty in winter with freezing nights and mostly mild, sunny days. Frost is very common but snow is rare. Snowfall was reported in August 2006 with snowfalls occurring again at the airport on 26 July 2007. As recently as August 2020 and July 2021 very light snow fell across the city with heavier snowfall on 4 June 2024. In addition, the city's highland elevation allows for exceptional temperature diurnal of about 15–20°C (27–36°F)

Climate data for Bloemfontein, elevation 1,353 m (4,439 ft), (1991−2020 normals)
Month	Jan	Feb	Mar	Apr	May	Jun	Jul	Aug	Sep	Oct	Nov	Dec	Year
Record high °C (°F)	39.3 (102.7)	38.9 (102.0)	34.7 (94.5)	33.3 (91.9)	29.5 (85.1)	24.5 (76.1)	26.5 (79.7)	28.6 (83.5)	33.6 (92.5)	34.8 (94.6)	36.6 (97.9)	37.7 (99.9)	39.3 (102.7)
Mean daily maximum °C (°F)	30.8 (87.4)	29.8 (85.6)	27.9 (82.2)	24.2 (75.6)	21.3 (70.3)	18.1 (64.6)	18.2 (64.8)	20.9 (69.6)	25.2 (77.4)	27.4 (81.3)	28.8 (83.8)	30.5 (86.9)	25.2 (77.4)
Daily mean °C (°F)	22.9 (73.2)	22.2 (72.0)	20.0 (68.0)	15.8 (60.4)	11.8 (53.2)	8.2 (46.8)	7.9 (46.2)	10.7 (51.3)	14.9 (58.8)	18.3 (64.9)	20.1 (68.2)	22.2 (72.0)	16.2 (61.2)
Mean daily minimum °C (°F)	15.1 (59.2)	14.6 (58.3)	12.1 (53.8)	7.3 (45.1)	2.2 (36.0)	−1.7 (28.9)	−2.3 (27.9)	0.4 (32.7)	4.7 (40.5)	9.1 (48.4)	11.4 (52.5)	13.8 (56.8)	7.2 (45.0)
Record low °C (°F)	5.6 (42.1)	4.3 (39.7)	0.8 (33.4)	−2.6 (27.3)	−8.7 (16.3)	−9.1 (15.6)	−9.6 (14.7)	−9.7 (14.5)	−6.7 (19.9)	−2.9 (26.8)	−0.1 (31.8)	3.3 (37.9)	−9.7 (14.5)
Average precipitation mm (inches)	91.8 (3.61)	83.1 (3.27)	77.0 (3.03)	43.6 (1.72)	19.0 (0.75)	12.5 (0.49)	5.3 (0.21)	9.9 (0.39)	11.6 (0.46)	45.5 (1.79)	64.8 (2.55)	71.3 (2.81)	535.2 (21.07)
Average precipitation days (≥ 1.0 mm)	8.9	7.8	7.2	5.2	2.4	1.4	0.7	1.3	1.6	4.6	5.8	7.5	54.5
Average relative humidity (%)	55	62	64	66	62	62	57	50	46	50	52	52	57
Average dew point °C (°F)	13.4 (56.1)	14.6 (58.3)	13.0 (55.4)	9.5 (49.1)	4.8 (40.6)	1.4 (34.5)	−0.1 (31.8)	0.7 (33.3)	3.4 (38.1)	7.7 (45.9)	9.9 (49.8)	11.9 (53.4)	7.5 (45.5)
Mean monthly sunshine hours	287.1	247.1	257.4	244.6	257.3	239.9	265.9	282.3	273.7	286.1	289.7	291.6	3,222.8
Source 1: NOAA (humidity 1961–1990)
Source 2: South African Weather Service (precipitation)

=== Suburbs ===
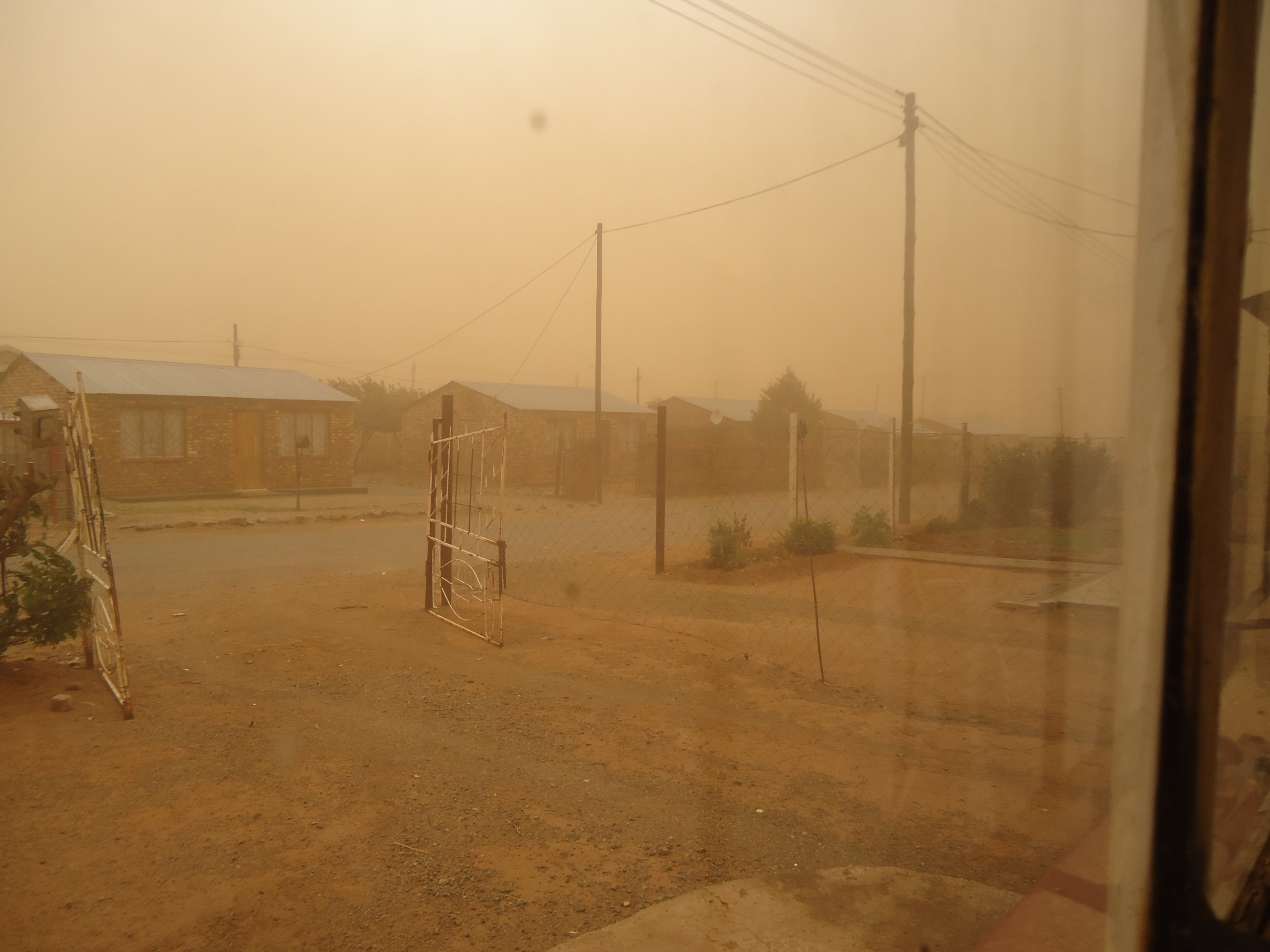
A dust storm envelops Bloemfontein

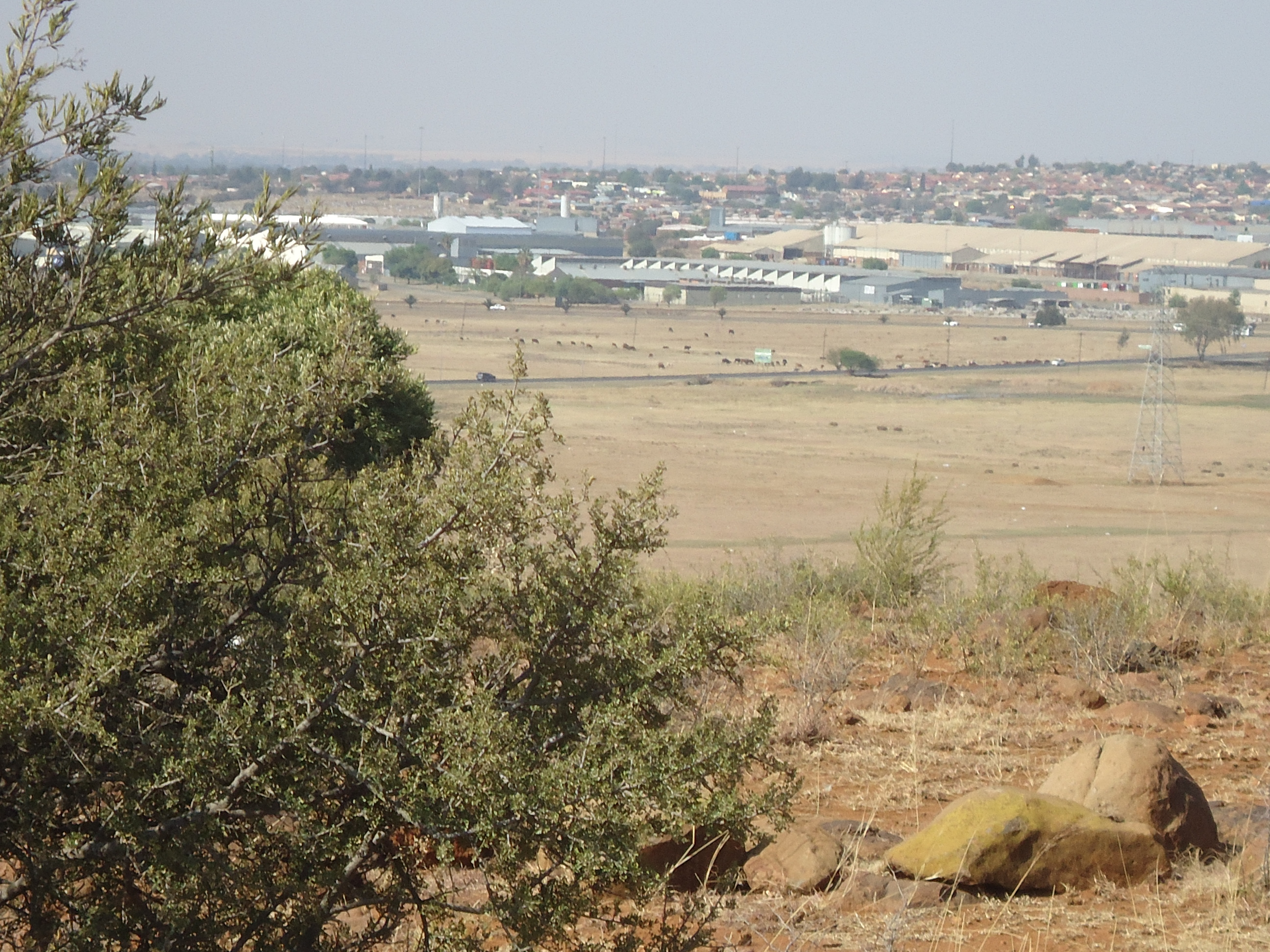
View of the Hamilton industrial area in Bloemfontein

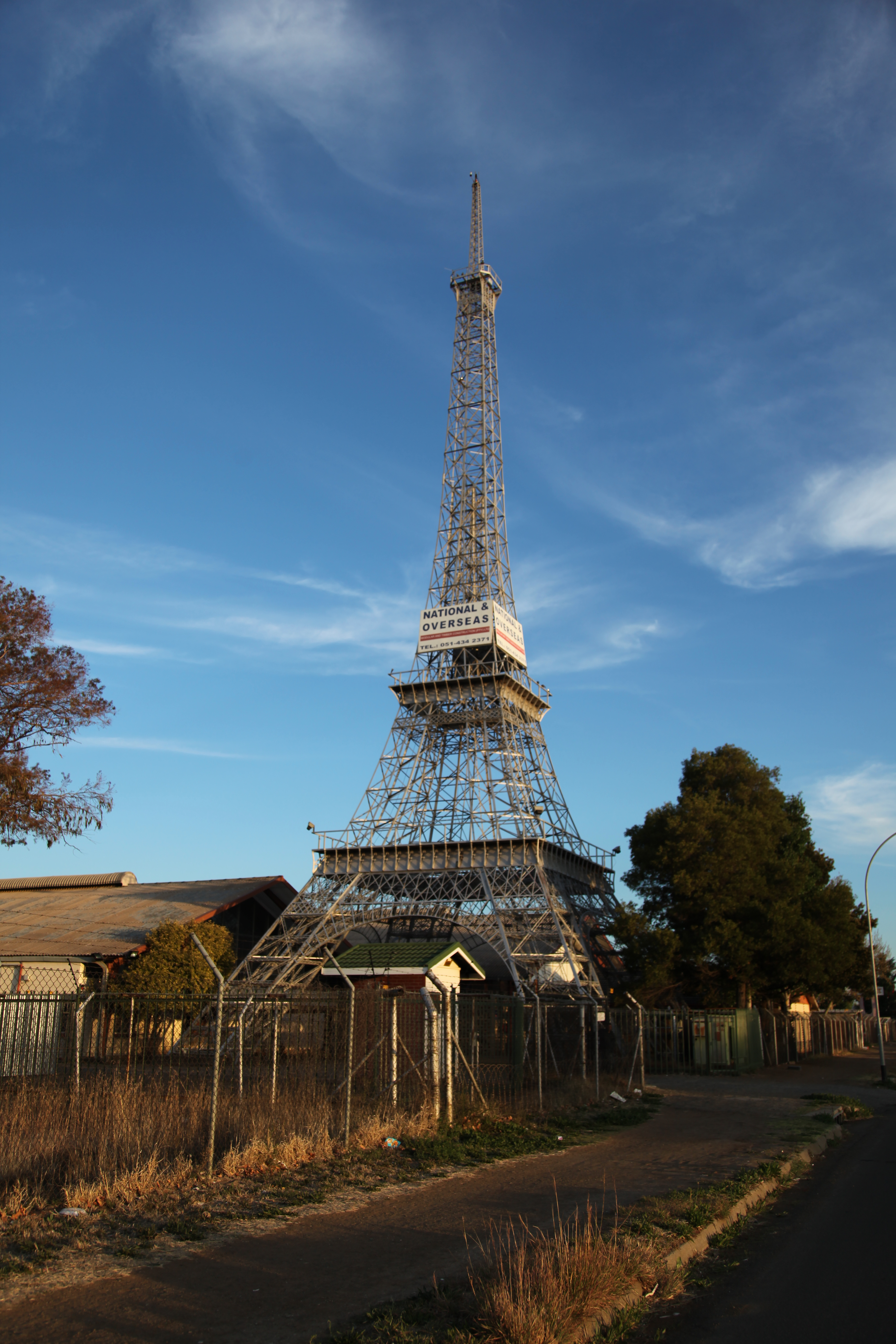
Replica Eiffel Tower in an industrial area next to Batho

Bloemfontein suburbs include Heidedal to the east and southeast, Bain's Vlei, Woodland Hills Wildlife Estate, Brandwag, Ehrlich Park, Fauna, Fichardt Park, Fleurdal, Gardenia Park, Generaal De Wet, Hospitaalpark, Kiepersol, Lourier Park, Park West, Pellissier, Uitsig, Universitas, Westdene, Wilgehof and Willows to the south of the city. In the centre is Bloemfontein Central. To the west of Bloemfontein, you will find Langenhoven Park. To the north you will find Arboretum, Baysvalley, Bayswater, Dan Pienaar, Helicon Heights, Heuwelsig, Hillsboro, Hillside, Hilton, Naval Hill, Navalsig, Noordhoek, Pentagon Park, Panorama Park, and Waverley. To the northeast, you will find Roodewal and Vallombrosa. The predominantly black suburbs are Rocklands, Phahameng, Phelindaba, Bloemanda, Bochabela, JB Mafora, and the most historic Batho, where the Maphikela House (where the African National Congress started) is situated.

== Sports ==
=== Stadium ===
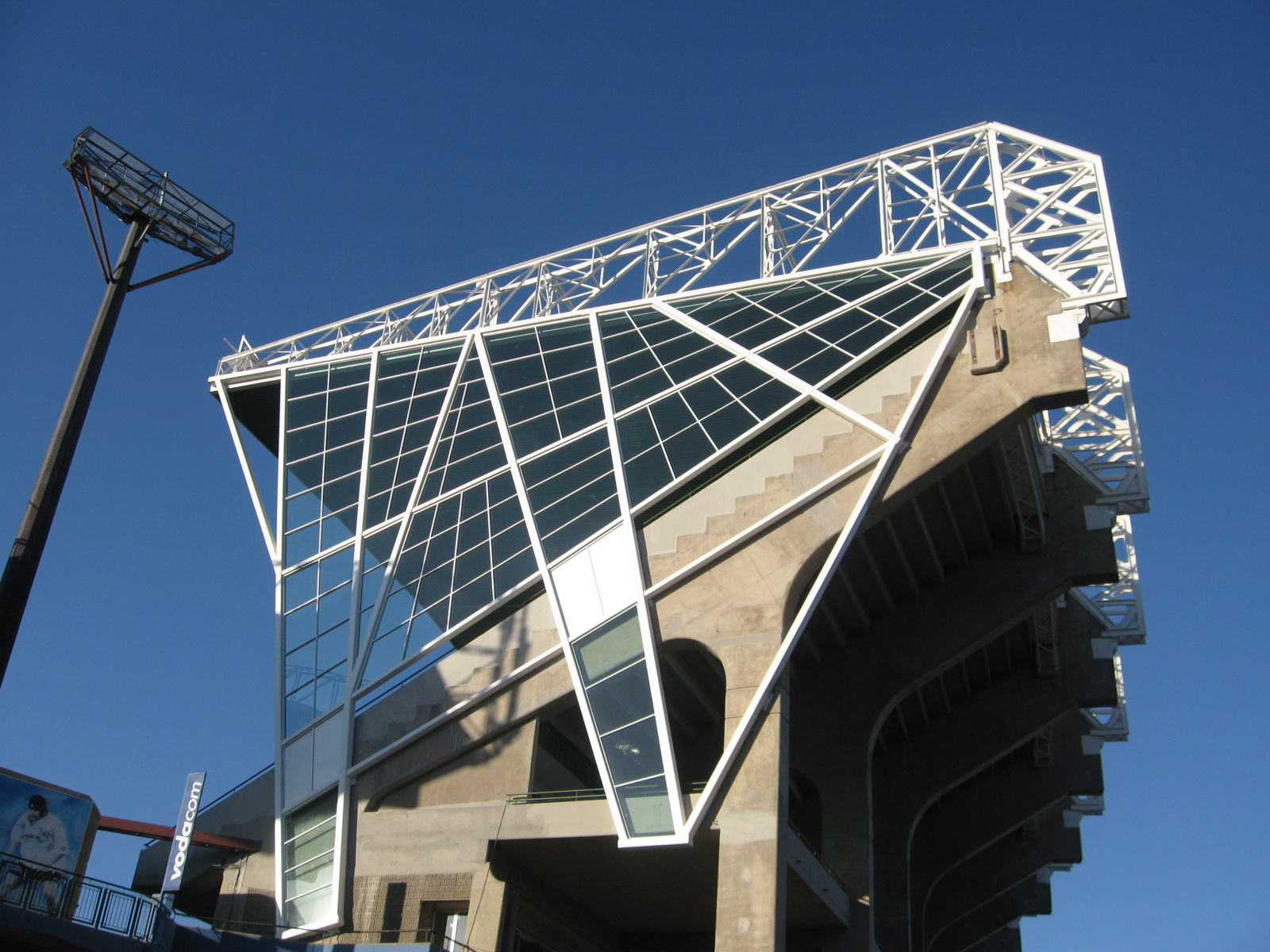
Free State Stadium

The Free State Stadium and the surrounding sports complex are the primary sports venues in the city and province. The venue was the hosting stadium of the 2010 FIFA World Cup South Africa matches played in Bloemfontein. There are several other sports venues in the city, however, including facilities belonging to the university, schools and sports clubs. Other stadiums in the city are Mangaung Oval, Dr. Petrus Molemela Stadium and Clive Solomons Stadium.

=== Soccer ===
Bloemfontein was joint home (together with nearby Botshabelo) to South African Premiership team Bloemfontein Celtic before the team sold their franchise in 2021. Some of the matches of the 2010 FIFA World Cup were played at the Free State Stadium, including the historic 4–1 defeat of England by Germany in the round of 16

=== Rugby ===
Bloemfontein's Free State Stadium is home to two rugby union teams; the Cheetahs, who as of 2023 compete as in invited side in the EPCR Challenge Cup, and the Free State Cheetahs who play in the domestic Currie Cup. The Free State Cheetahs won the Currie Cup in 2005 against the Blue Bulls; they drew the final with the Blue Bulls in 2006 and retained the Currie Cup title in 2007 by beating the Golden Lions, resulting in the Cheetahs remaining Currie Cup champions until 2008 when the failed to make the final for the first time since 2004. 2009 saw the Cheetahs return to the Currie Cup final, but they could not beat the Blue Bulls at Loftus Versfeld. In 2016, the Cheetahs won the Currie Cup after a perfect season, beating the Blue Bulls in Bloemfontein.

=== Cricket ===
The Knights cricket team representing the Free State and Northern Cape in various series is located at Mangaung Oval, part of the Free State Stadium complex. Bloemfontein features as a regular venue for touring international and local cricket teams.

=== Soaring ===
The town has one of the most active soaring communities in South Africa and the world, using the New Tempe Airport, north of Bloemfontein.

=== Motor sports ===
Bloemfontein has a motocross track (tempe) run by the Bloemfontein Off Road Club, as well as a go-kart circuit (M&F Raceway), which was closed down in early 2015.

=== Shooting sports ===
Bloemfontein has a comprehensive shooting centre 20 km (12 mi) south of the city, offering most forms of shooting, including various clay target, pistol, and rifle disciplines. Bloemfontein's shooting sports community has produced many provincial and national representatives.

==== Metallic Silhouette Shooting ====
Bloemfontein's Metallic Silhouette Shooting Range is one of the top metallic silhouette shooting ranges in the world. Three IMSSU international championships have been held here:

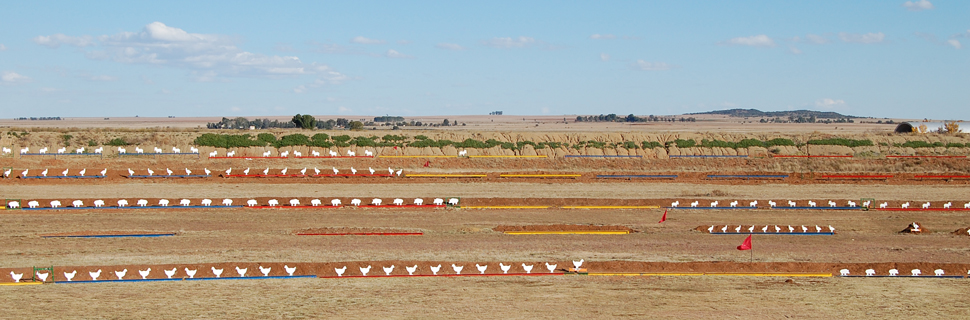
BMSSK metallic silhouette shooting range, 2010

- 2004 6th IMSSU World Championships
- 2006 7th IMSSU World Championships
- 2016 12th IMSSU World Championships

=== Rock climbing ===
Bloemfontein has two rock climbing clubs with a wall and boulder cave.

== Rose Festival ==
Every year, Bloemfontein, the 'City of Roses', celebrates the 'Bloemfontein Rose Festival', also known as the 'Mangaung Rose Festival', in October—the month in which roses in the Free State bloom best. The majority of the events happen at the Loch Logan Waterfront in Bloemfontein. The festival attracts rose enthusiasts from all over South Africa and the world to participate in and experience this showcase of roses and other local events and attractions. The festival has made Bloemfontein a popular tourist destination with thousands of people attending the festival annually.

=== History of the Rose Festival ===
The first rose festival occurred in 1976, when council members decided that hosting such a festival was appropriate, given the area's name. In 1976, the events spanned over a few days and included activities related to roses in the Sanlam Plaza. Since then, the rose festival has expanded and grown to meet the needs and interests of the public.

=== Activities ===
Horticulturalists are invited to participate in competitions to design and improve unkempt gardens around the city. Festival activities occur in private gardens all over Bloemfontein as city residents open their gardens to the general public.

==== Loch Logan Waterfront ====
Most festival activities occur at the Loch Logan Waterfront, the largest shopping centre in central South Africa. It spans about 80 000 m^{2} of space and is the hub of shopping, entertainment, sport, and culture in Bloemfontein. The waterfront displays flowers created by local nurseries as well as the official municipal display created by the parks department, which the Mangaung Municipality organises. The Free State Rose Society's champion Rose Cut Competition, with approximately 700 entrants every year, is also hosted at the Waterfront, along with the Miss Volksblad Rosebud competition for girls aged 3–4 years old, organised in conjunction with the Volksblad daily newspaper.

==== Rose Morning High Tea ====
The Rose Morning High Tea usually occurs at the Urth Garden Centre, where tea and treats are served. The Urth Garden Centre is a retail and wholesale nursery that is located on Kenneth Kaunda Road in Bloemfontein. The crowning of the King and Mangaung in the year of nomination.

==== Mangaung Rose Classic Cycle Tour ====
The Mangaung Rose Classic Cycle Tour is a road race that takes place during the festival every year. The event is organised by AfriCycle Tours, and the dates are announced annually. The race starts at the Urth, and the race distances include 22 km, 56 km, and 106 km.

==== Let's Green Bloem Expo ====
This expo forms part of the Mangaung/Bloemfontein Rose Festival and gives 'green' and organic local businesses an opportunity to promote their businesses. This includes showcasing different products and services that support a green environment, such as solar power, grey water systems, vegetable tunnels, JoJo tank systems, etc.

== Education ==
Bloemfontein houses many institutions of learning, from pre-schools to universities and colleges. Classes are taught in different languages from school to school, with some even teaching all their classes in two languages. The languages are predominantly Afrikaans, English, and Sesotho.

=== Primary education ===
- Grey College Primary School
- St. Andrew's Primary School

=== Secondary education ===
- Grey College
- St. Andrew's School
- Eunice High School
- Bloemfontein High School
- Hoërskool Fichardtpark
- Hoërskool Jim Fouché
- Hoërskool Sand du Plessis
- St. Michael's School
- Hoërskool Sentraal

=== Public tertiary institutions ===
- University of the Free State
- Central University of Technology

== Museums ==
Bloemfontein is home to a number of museums.

- Anglo-Boer War Museum
- National Afrikaans Literary Museum and Research Centre
- Oliewenhuis Art Museum.
- South African Armour Museum.
- Sesotho Literature Museum.

== Economy ==
The private sector mainly drives Bloemfontein's economy. Bloemfontein's share of National GDP, employment, and population is the lowest among the benchmark group of South African and Southern African cities, falling just below the city of Port Elizabeth. The city's share of the National GDP is 1.73%, with a share of national employment at 1.86% and a share of the national population at 1.67%. Bloemfontein's GDP growth, at 0.57% in 2015, stood in the lower half of the benchmark group of cities. Like other major cities in South Africa, Bloemfontein's GDP growth has slowly decreased in recent years.

=== Major companies ===
The city is home to two of South Africa's top construction and infrastructure companies. Raubex, established in 1974 and listed on the JSE Limited since March 2007 and Ruwacon (Pty Ltd), established in 1999.

Other major companies included the retail department store, Kloppers, established in 1967 and EconoFoods (Pty Ltd) established in 1996.

=== Entertainment ===
- Sand du Plessis Theatre

Queen of Roses also happens during this event. The competition recognizes citizens of the City of Bloemfontein for contributions that go beyond their regular duties to enrich the Mangaung Metro. Nominees need to be citizens.

== Media ==
=== Newspapers ===
- Volksblad

=== Radio ===
- OFM
- Lesedi FM
- Motheo FM
- Radio Rosestad 100.6 FM
- Motsweding FM

== Transport ==
=== Road ===
The N1, a major highway running roughly SW to NE from Cape Town to Johannesburg, Pretoria and Zimbabwe largely bypasses the city centre to the west as the Bloemfontein Western Bypass. The N8 runs east/west connecting Bloemfontein to Kimberley in the west and Maseru, the capital of Lesotho, in the east. Bloemfontein is also the northern end of the N6 road heading roughly southwards to Maletswai, Komani and the port of East London.

The R64 is the old road to Kimberley, passing through Dealesville and Boshof. The R30 begins north of Bloemfontein and connects northwards to Welkom, Klerksdorp, Ventersdorp and Rustenburg.

The R706 takes origin from the N8 in the city centre, and heads south-west towards Jagersfontein and Fauresmith. The R702 originates from the N6 south of the city centre and heads south-east towards the towns of Dewetsdorp and Wepener. The R700 starts in the city centre from the N8 and heads north, crossing the N1 towards Bultfontein and Hoopstad.

Below that level, Bloemfontein has several metropolitan or M roads. These roads are numbered independently of M-roads in other South African cities.

=== Rail ===
Bloemfontein is well connected with rail. It is located on the most important rail junction between Johannesburg and Cape Town, with daily trains to Port Elizabeth, East London and Johannesburg.

=== Air ===
Bloemfontein has two airports:

- New Tempe Aerodrome has no scheduled flights; it is a training facility for aviators and schools.
- Bram Fischer International Airport has scheduled flights to South Africa's major cities.

=== Public transport ===
In October 2016, the Mangaung Metropolitan Municipality and various taxi associations agreed on the Integrated Public Transport system, which is currently under construction. The project consists of two phases. The first phase will involve the construction of busways along the city's roads. The second will be the building of depots and stations.

== Notable people ==
Many famous people are associated with Bloemfontein; these include:

=== Rugby players ===
- François Steyn, rugby player
- Juan Smith, rugby player
- Os du Randt, rugby player
- Chris Dry, South Africa national rugby sevens team player
- Naka Drotské, rugby player
- Brendan Venter, rugby player
- Andre Joubert, rugby player
- Andre Venter, rugby player
- Ruben Kruger, rugby player
- Ollie Le Roux, rugby player
- Coenie Oosthuizen, rugby player
- Jannie de Beer, rugby player
- Ox Nché, rugby player

=== Cricket players ===
- Allan Donald, South African cricketer
- Hansie Cronje, South African cricket captain
- Morne van Wyk, played for South Africa Proteas Cricket team
- Kepler Wessels, test cricketer with Australia and South Africa

=== Football players ===
- Willem Jackson played for Bloemfontein Celtic and South Africa national football team.
- Vuyo Mere plays for Moroka Swallows.
- Thabo Nthethe played for Bloemfontein Celtic, Mamelodi Sundowns, Chippa United and South Africa national football team.
- Thembinkosi Lorch former Orlando Pirates player, currently with Wydad AC.
- Kgotso Moleko plays for Kaizer Chiefs.
- Neo Maema plays for Mamelodi Sundowns.

=== Musicians ===
- Leon Schuster, filmmaker, comedian and musician, born and schooled in Bloemfontein
- Shaun Morgan and Dale Stewart, musicians and founding members of the band Seether
- Coenie de Villiers, Afrikaans musician and songwriter
- Brendan Peyper, Afrikaans musician and songwriter

=== Actors/directors ===
- Leon Schuster, filmmaker, comedian and musician, born and schooled in Bloemfontein
- Tony Kgoroge, South African actor, performances in movies including Hotel Rwanda, Blood Diamond, Invictus, Lord of War and Skin

=== Other ===
- J. R. R. Tolkien CBE was born in Bloemfontein on 3 January 1892. Tolkien is famous for creating the Legendarium fantasy epics, The Hobbit, The Lord of the Rings and The Silmarillion. At three years of age, Tolkien left South Africa for England.
- Ryk Neethling, Olympic gold medalist swimmer
- Zola Budd, international long-distance athlete, born in the city and attended Sentraal High School
- Gerrit Badenhorst, a powerlifter and strongman competitor.
- Karla Pretorius, South Africa national netball team player, attended the University of the Free State
- Frans Claerhout, artist
- Gert Coetzer, rugby league footballer who played in the 1960s
- Beric John Croome, Advocate of the High Court of South Africa
- Winkie Direko, first black chancellor of the University of the Free State
- Lizzie van Zyl, Child inmate of the Bloemfontein concentration camp during the Second Boer War
- Dr John Vernon Harrison FRSE geologist, was born here
- Flaxman Qoopane, writer
- Billy Modise
- Elzabe Rockman, former Free State MEC for Finance
- Stuart White, racing driver

== Religion ==
Bloemfontein has a large and diverse Christian population. The city houses several churches and denominations:

- It is the seat of the Anglican Diocese of the Free State
- Afrikaans Baptist Church (Afrikaans: Afrikaanse Baptiste Kerk)
- Dutch Reformed Church (Afrikaans: Nederduitse Gereformeerde Kerk)
- Sacred Heart Cathedral in Bloemfontein is the seat of the Roman Catholic Archdiocese of Bloemfontein
- Seventh-day Adventist Church, Southern African headquarters.
- Christian Revival Church.
- New Covenant Ministries International had a church called Fountainhead led by Chris Gerber. It was a New Testament Church known as Fountainhead Church International. Later, this church merged with Doxa Deo Bloemfontein, now the combined church's name.

The city also has a large Jewish population, established in the mid-19th century.

There are two main cemeteries in Bloemfontein:

- The Old Cemetery: Over 1,000 names from the three cemeteries. Old: The oldest of the three cemeteries, dating from 1871, is simply a tiny fenced-off area of a public cemetery near the city centre. It includes a few graves of several Jewish pioneers involved in the city's early days who died serving on either side in the Boer War, 1899–1902. Each of these pioneer families' thirty or so tombstones has been completely transcribed.
- South Park: This cemetery was consecrated in 1978 and now includes over 10,000 graves. It is the biggest cemetery in the Free State.

On 7 October 2010, Several tombstones in the Jewish cemetery in Bloemfontein were defaced with swastikas and antisemitic graffiti. On 10 April 2012, Bloemfontein's historic Memorium cemetery was vandalized, with 35 tombstones toppled and obscene graffiti daubed on the walls of the adjoining Ohel. The graffiti included images of money bags and diamonds, as well as of a crudely drawn Magen David, allegedly as part of an anti-Semitic act. There is also the old Phahameng cemetery, which dates back to the 1960s and was explicitly reserved for Africans during the apartheid era and has a Heroes Acre, where freedom fighters are laid to rest. The Heide Heights cemetery in Heidedal was reserved for coloured people during the apartheid era, but all races could bury their dead after 1994. This cemetery has been closed due to it being full.

== Community service organisations ==
- Round Table 158 Bloemfontein The first Round Table was formed in Norwich, England in 1927. The founder, Louis Marchesi, was a young member of the Norwich Rotary Club who felt a need existed for a club where the young business owners of the town could gather regularly. At their meetings, they could exchange ideas, learn from the experiences of their colleagues, and play a collective part in the civic life of Norwich. From a very early stage, it was agreed that Round Table would be a non-religious, non-political club, which has continued to this day.
- Child Welfare Bloemfontein Child Welfare Bloemfontein & Childline Free State is a non-profit organisation that was founded in 1914 by a group of volunteers who identified a need for welfare services among the community. In 2004, Child Welfare Bloemfontein celebrated its 90th birthday. Over the past 90 years, many community programmes have been successfully implemented.
- Freemasons The Masonic Centre, Bloemfontein, was built during the 1970s when all the Masonic Lodges in Bloemfontein, sold their individual properties. The centre was erected to facilitate all Masonic activities in Bloemfontein and surrounding areas. All four active Constitutions in South Africa gather at the centre. The lodges that own the centre are Lodge Unie (est. 1864), the Rising Star Lodge (est. 1865), Thistle Lodge (est.1903), Emerald Lodge (est. 1905), Lodge Dagbreek (est. 1932) & Lodge Oranje (est. 1964). Various side degrees are catered for at the Centre, which includes the Mark, Ark, the Royal Arch & Rose Croix. Bloemfontein has a rich Masonic history, especially in the Anglo-Boer War (1899–1902), with members such as Lord Kitchener, Rudyard Kipling and Sir Arthur Conan Doyle, visiting Lodges in Bloemfontein.

== International relations ==
=== Sister cities ===
- Nanjing, China
- Bhubaneshwar, India
