= Brandwag, Bloemfontein =

Brandwag
- Location within Free State (South African province) Location within South Africa
- Coordinates: 29°6′11″S 26°11′48″E
- Country: South Africa
- Province: Free State
- Municipality: Mangaung
- Main Place: Bloemfontein

Area
  - Total: 1.49 km^{2} (0.58 sq mi)

Population (2011)
  - Total: 4,075
  - Density: 2,730/km^{2} (7,080/sq mi)

Racial makeup (2011)
  - Black African: 65.7%
  - Coloured: 6.5%
  - Indian/Asian: 1.8%
  - White: 25.4%
  - Other: 0.6%

First languages (2011)
  - Afrikaans: 30.7%
  - Sotho: 22.4%
  - English: 81.1%
  - Tswana: 8.1%
  - Xhosa: 8.0%
- Time zone: UTC+2 (SAST)
- Postal code (street): 9301
- PO box: n/a
- Area code: 051

Brandwag is a suburb of the city of Bloemfontein in South Africa. The primary school is named Brandwag Primary.
