= Bloemfontein Central =

Bloemfontein CBD Bloemfontein Downtown
- Location within Free State (South African province) Location within South Africa
- Coordinates: 29°6′48″S 26°12′54″E
- Country: South Africa
- Province: Free State
- Municipality: Mangaung
- Main Place: Bloemfontein

Area
  - Total: 2.58 km^{2} (1.00 sq mi)

Population (2011)
  - Total: 7,578
  - Density: 2,940/km^{2} (7,610/sq mi)

Racial makeup (2011)
  - Black African: 66.3%
  - Coloured: 7.5%
  - Indian/Asian: 3.3%
  - White: 21.9%
  - Other: 1.0%

First languages (2011)
  - Afrikaans: 28.6%
  - Sotho: 26.7%
  - English: 16.9%
  - Other: 27.8%
- Time zone: UTC+2 (SAST)

Bloemfontein CBD is the main business district of the city of Bloemfontein, in the Free State province of South Africa.
