= Mannete Ramaili =

Lesotho diplomat and politician

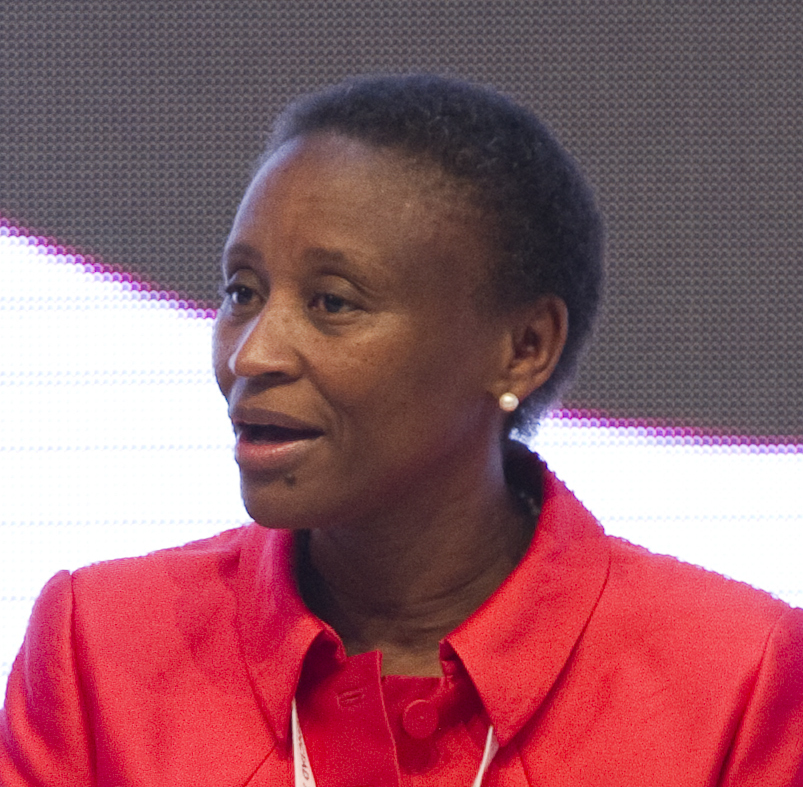

Minister of Tourism, Culture & Environment
- In office 2010–2012
- Appointed by: Pakalitha Mosisili

Ambassador to the Republic of Ireland and the Nordic States
- In office 2009–2005

Personal details
- Born: 1960 (age 65–66) Butha-Buthe

Mannete Ramaili is a Kingdom of Lesotho diplomat and politician. She served as Lesotho ambassador to the Republic of Ireland and was minister of Tourism, Culture and Environment of Lesotho.

== Early life ==
Ramaili was born in Lesotho and has been outspoken about women's rights since 1987. Earlier in her career she was involved with the International Planned Parenthood Federation.

== Political career ==
In 2005, Ramaili was appointed Ambassador of the Kingdom of Lesotho to the Republic of Ireland. Ramaili was Lesotho's ambassador until 2009. During her time in Ireland she helped to establish the Irish NGO 'Action Lesotho' which works in Maputsoe. During her time she visited areas across Ireland with His Excellency Paddy Fay to raise awareness on issues that affect the people of Lesotho. Issues such as HIV and female genital mutilation.

In 2010, Ramaili was appointed Minister for Tourism, Culture and Environment, following the dismissal from government of Lebohang Ntsinyi by Prime Minister Pakalitha Mosisili. As of April 2011, Ramaili was one of seven women ministers in the Cabinet, alongside: Mamphono Khaketla, Maphoka Motoboli, Mathabiso Lepono, Mphu Keneileo Ramatlapeng, Mpeo Mahase-Moiloa and Pontso Suzan Matumelo Sekatle. She has led measures to cut alcohol consumption in Lesotho.

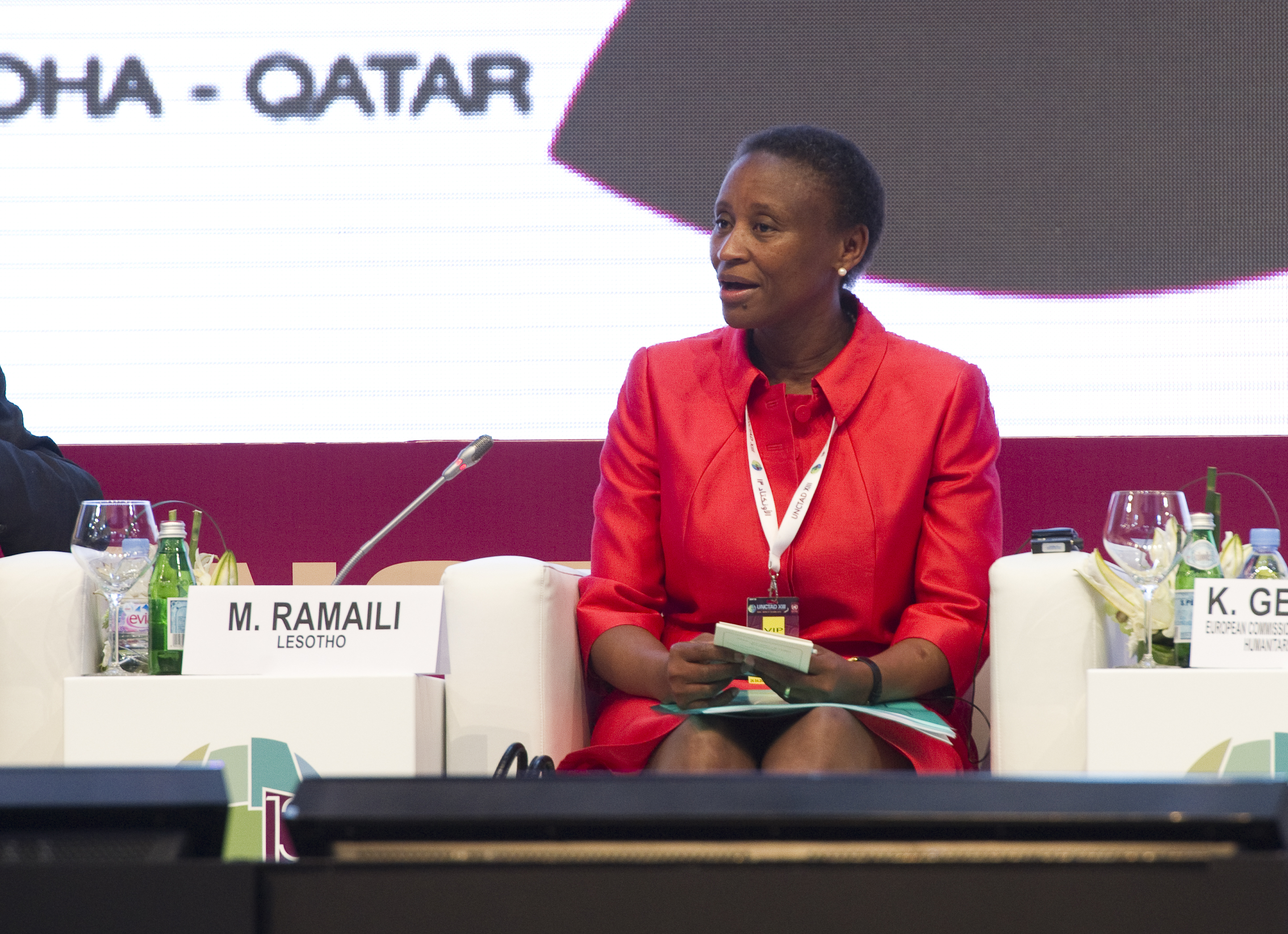
Mannete Ramaili, Minister of Tourism, Environment and Culture of the Kingdom of Lesotho (6960295608)

In partnership with the Chinese government, Ramaili was instrumental is setting up a ceramics training scheme in Lesotho in 2012. The same year she spoke out in Lesotho in support of fairer and more transparent election coverage in the media.

In 2012 she spoke at an event - 'Women in Development' - organised by the United Nations. Here, Ramaili spoke about the need for greater legislation against domestic violence, but also pointed out the Lesotho was ranked ninth out 135 countries on the World Economic Forum Gender Gap Index - ahead of the UK, USA and France.

Ramaili is one of Lesotho's leading female entrepreneurs and is vocal about the importance of female economic empowerment for Lesotho. She is a board member of Standard Lesotho Bank.

== Awards ==
Africa Day Award (Ireland)
