= Lesotho–South Africa border =

International border

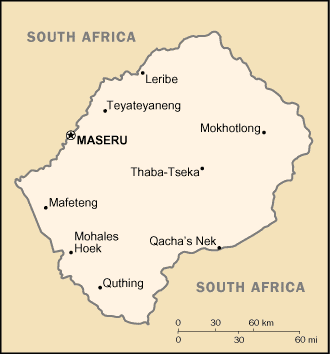
Lesotho is surrounded by South African territory

The border between Lesotho and South Africa is 909 kilometres (565 mi) long and forms a complete loop, as Lesotho is an enclave entirely surrounded by South Africa. The border follows the Caledon River, the drainage divide of the Drakensberg mountains, the Orange River, the Makhaleng River, and a series of hills joining the Makhaleng back to the Caledon.

== History ==
The Basotho people formed a distinct polity in the 1820s under Moshoeshoe I, the first Paramount Chief. At that time Basotho territory included much of what is now the Free State province of South Africa. This territory was lost in the 1850s and 1860s in a series of wars between the Basotho and the Boers of the Orange Free State. In 1868 Basutoland (as it was then known) became a British protectorate. Except for a period of annexation to the Cape Colony from 1871 to 1884, it remained in this status until independence was achieved as the Kingdom of Lesotho in 1966.

The border between Basutoland and the Orange Free State was defined in the 1869 Convention of Aliwal North. This border was confirmed, and the border with the Cape Colony and Natal Colony defined, by High Commissioner's notice of 13 May 1870, as amended by Government Notice No. 74 of 6 November 1871. In this notice the boundaries of "British Basutoland" were described as being:

From the junction of the Cornetspruit with the Orange River, along the centre of the former to the point nearest to Olifantsbeen; from that point, by Olifantsbeen, to the southern point of Langeberg, along the top of Langeberg to its north-western extremity; from thence to the eastern point of Jammerberg; along the top of Jammerberg to its north-western extremity; from thence by a prolongation of the same, to the Caledon River; along the centre of the Caledon River to the heads of the Orange River at the Mont aux Sources; thence westward along the Drakensberg, between the Watersheds of the Orange River and the St. John's River to the source of the Tees; down the centre of the river to its junction with the Orange River, and down the centre of the latter river to its junction with the Cornetspruit.

Cornetspruit, St. John's River and Tees River are now known as Makhaleng River, Umzimvubu River and Tele River respectively. Olifantsbeen, Langeberg and Jammerberg are mountains in the area between the Makhaleng and the Caledon.

== Geography ==
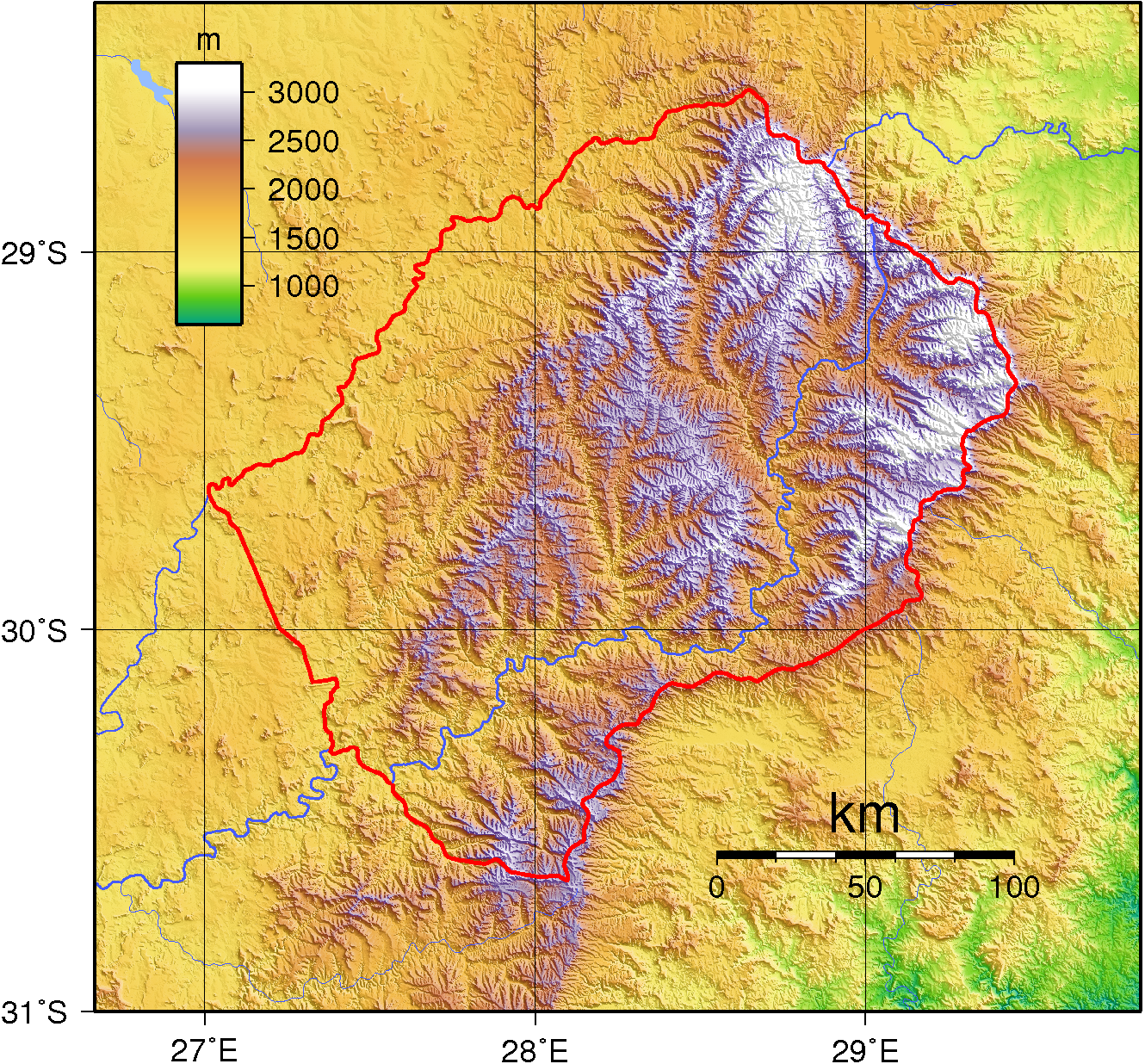
Topography of Lesotho

Starting at Mont-Aux-Sources, the border runs along the drainage divide between the basin of the Orange River (which flows to the Atlantic Ocean) and the various rivers flowing off the Drakensberg to the Indian Ocean. It follows this watershed as far as the source of the Tele River near Ben Macdhui; from there it follows the Tele to its confluence with the Orange River, and the Orange to its confluence with the Makhaleng River.

From this confluence the border runs up the Makhaleng River to a point west of Mohale's Hoek, and then along a series of hills and straight-line segments to meet the Caledon River north of Wepener. The border then follows the Caledon River, past the Lesotho capital of Maseru and the South African town of Ficksburg, all the way to the source of the river, marked by a beacon at Quaneka Neck. From this beacon it follows the drainage divide between the Orange River and Vaal River basins to Mont-aux-Sources.

All ten districts of Lesotho touch the border, as do three provinces of South Africa: the Free State, KwaZulu-Natal, and the Eastern Cape.

== Crossings ==
Maseru Bridge border crossing, South African side

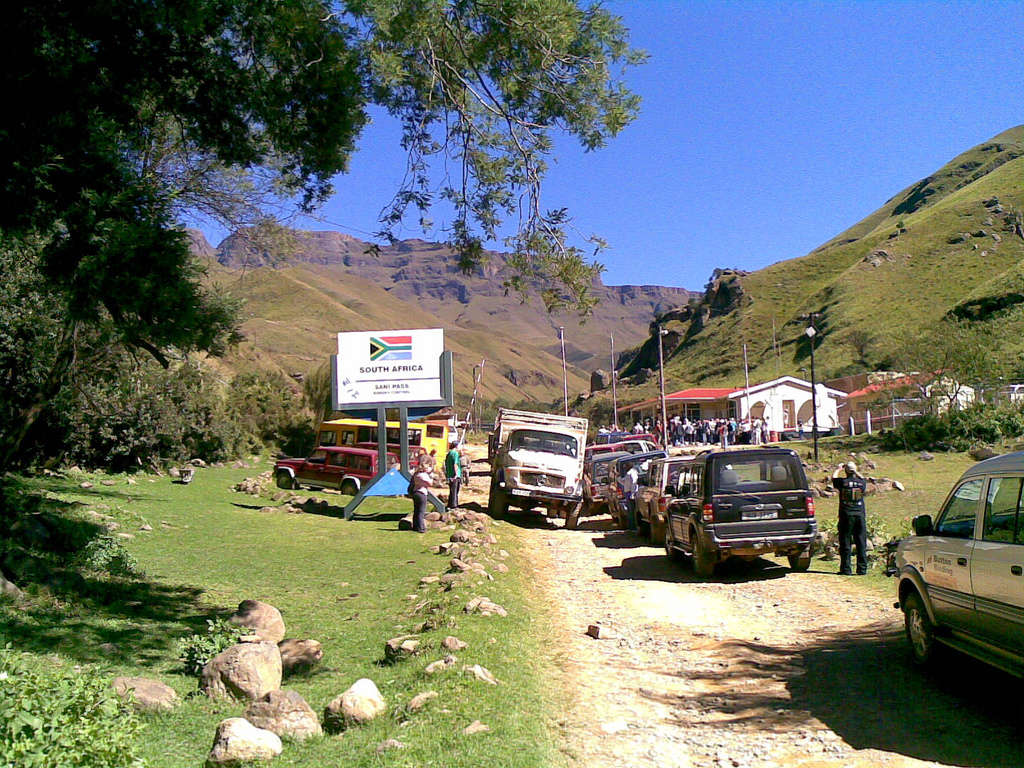
The South African border post on Sani Pass

The official border crossings are described in the following table, which is ordered clockwise beginning at Maseru Bridge.

Lesotho		South Africa		Opening hours	Notes	Geographical coordinates
Road	Border post	Road	Border post	Opening hours	Notes	Geographical coordinates
A2	Maseru Bridge	N8	Maseru Bridge	24 hours	Maseru branch line railway also crosses here.	29.2980°S 27.4546°E
	Peka Bridge		Peka Bridge	08:00–16:00		28.9450°S 27.7344°E
	Maputsoe		Ficksburg Bridge	24 hours		28.8839°S 27.8903°E
	Caledonspoort		Caledonspoort	06:00–22:00		28.6948°S 28.2339°E
	Monantsa Pass		Monantsa Pass	08:00–16:00		28.5902°S 28.6826°E
	Sani Pass		Sani Pass	06:00–18:00	Four-wheel drive vehicle required.	29.5847°S 29.2863°E
	Ngoangoana		Boesmansnek	08:00–16:00	Closed to vehicles.	29.8849°S 29.1532°E
	Ramatseliso's Gate		Ramatseliso's Gate	08:00–16:00		30.0502°S 28.9339°E
	Qacha's Nek		Qacha's Nek	06:00–22:00		30.1297°S 28.6856°E
	Ongeluksnek		Ongeluksnek	08:00–16:00	Four-wheel drive vehicle required.	30.3383°S 28.2519°E
A24	Tele Bridge	R393	Tele Bridge	06:00–22:00		30.4319°S 27.5673°E
	Makhaleng Bridge		Makhaleng Bridge	08:00–16:00		30.1641°S 27.3996°E
	Sepapu's Gate		Sepapu's Gate	08:00–16:00		29.9476°S 27.1993°E
	Van Rooyen's Gate		Van Rooyen's Gate	06:00–22:00		29.7560°S 27.1091°E
