= Main roads (Lesotho) =

Main Roads in Lesotho

National Highway system in Lesotho

System information
- Formed: 1990
- Transport in Lesotho

Main Roads in Lesotho are a class of trunk roads and freeways which connect major cities. They form the highest category in the Lesotho route numbering scheme, and are designated with route numbers beginning with "A", from A1 to A99.

== Table of routes ==
A2 in Ha Matala, Lithabaneng

=== Trunk roads ===
Road	Course	Length (km)	Length (mi)
A1	Maseru – Butha-Buthe – Mokhotlong	300	190
A2	(South Africa at N8) Maseru Bridge – Maseru – Mafeteng – Quthing	160	99
A3	St. Michael’s – Thaba-Tseka – Mokhotlong	200	120
A4	Quthing – Mount Moorosi – Quthing – Qacha's Nek – Thaba-Tseka	340	210
A5	St. Michael’s – Semonkong – Seforong	120	75
A10	Maseru Ring	30	19
A11	Peka – Peka Bridge (South Africa at R26)	6	3.7
A12	Maputsoe – Ficksburg Bridge (South Africa at R26)	6	3.7
A14	Molumong – Sani Pass (South Africa at R617)	54	34
A20	Mafeteng – Van Rooyens Gate (South Africa R702)	20	12
A22	Mokoroane – Sephapho's Gate (South Africa at R26)	7	4.3
A23	Khitsane – (South Africa at R26)	6	3.7
A24	Alwyns Kop – Tele Bridge (South Africa at R26)	12	7.5
A25	Hlotse – Seshote – Thaba-Tseka	180	110
