= 'Mamphono Khaketla =

Lesotho mathematician and senator

Personal details
- Born: March 5, 1960 (age 66) Maseru, Lesotho
- Parent(s): Bennett Makalo Khaketla; Ntšeliseng 'Masechele Khaketla
- Education: National University of Lesotho 1980
- Alma mater: University of Wisconsin 1991
- Occupation: Mathematician

'Mamphono Khaketla (born 5 March 1960) is a Lesotho mathematician and senator who served as Minister of Finance from March 2015 to June 2017.

== Early life and education ==
Khaketla was born in Maseru on 5 March 1960 to Bennett Makalo and Caroline Ntseliseng ’Masechele Khaketla. Her father was a novelist, journalist, politician and former minister, as well as the major shareholder of Mohlabani Property Company, and left her a sizeable estate. Her mother was a teacher and author, one of the first women published in Lesotho.

Khaketla did her primary and secondary schooling Maseru, before receiving a Bachelor of Education from the National University of Lesotho in 1980. She has a master's degree in education and a PhD in mathematics education from the University of Wisconsin (1991). Her thesis was titled "An analysis of the Lesotho Junior Certificate Mathematics Examination and its impact on instructions".

== Career ==
Khaketla was a lecturer in mathematics at the National Teacher Training College from 1981 until 1995 and became assistant director of the college. She worked at the Institute of Development Management in Lesotho and Botswana from 1996 until 2001 before becoming the director of the Centre for Accounting Studies.

Khaketla was appointed as a senator by Prime Minister Pakalitha Mosisili in 2002 and served as Minister of Communications, Science and Technology from 2002 until 2004. At the 2007 election, she lost her seat but was elected to the National Assembly as one of the Lesotho Congress for Democracy members on a party list for proportional representation submitted by the National Independence Party. She served as Minister of Education and Training from 2007 until 2012. In 2011, Khaketla was one of seven women ministers in the Cabinet, alongside: Mannete Ramali, Maphoka Motoboli, Mathabiso Lepono, Mphu Keneileo Ramatlapeng, Mpeo Mahase-Moiloa and Pontso Suzan Matumelo Sekatle. On 30 March 2015 she was appointed Minister of Finance.

In November 2015, she presided over the 102nd session of the African, Caribbean and Pacific Group of States Council of Ministers.

In July 2016, Khaketla was accused of soliciting a bribe for a major government contract in a case that was before the courts. She denied the allegation.

== Publications ==
- Romberg, Thomas A.; Wilson, Linda; Khaketla, Mamphono (1989). "An examination of six standard mathematics tests for grade eight" (Document). National Center for Research in Mathematical Sciences Education.
- Romberg, T. A.; Wilson, L.; Khaketla, M. (1989). "The alignment of six standardized tests with the NCTM standards" (Document). Washington, DC: National Summit on Mathematics Assessment convened by the Mathematical Sciences Education Board.
- Romberg, Thomas A.; Wilson, Linda; Khaketla, 'Mamphono; Chavarria, Silvia (1992). "Curriculum and Test Alignment". In Thomas A. Romberg (ed.). Mathematics Assessment and Evaluation: Imperatives for Mathematics Educators. SUNY Press. pp. 61–74. ISBN 9780791409008.
