= Peka =

Peka may refer to:

== Politics ==
- PEKA or Politiki Epitropi Kypriakou Agona, political wing of the Greek nationalist group EOKA

== Places ==
- Peka (Lesotho), a city
- Peka Bridge, a border post located between South Africa and Lesotho
- Te Peka, a locality in the Southland region of New Zealand's South Island
- Peka Peka, sometimes Pekapeka, a lightly populated seaside locality on the Kapiti Coast of New Zealand's North Island
- Peka, a nickname for Krešimir Ćosić Hall, a sporting arena in Zadar, Croatia

== Persons ==
- Avenir Peka (born 1978), Albanian politician and minister
- Jan Peka (1894–1985), Czechoslovak ice hockey player and Olympian
- Lucia Peka (1912–1991), Latvian-American artist
- Ludwig Peka, Papua New Guinean professional football manager

== Other uses ==
- Peka (cookware), a metal lid for cooking with coal and ash, also known as sač

== See also ==
- Pekka (disambiguation)
- Pekka (name)
