= Mathabiso Lepono =

Mosotho politician

Mathabiso Angeline Lepono (born 1942) is a Mosotho politician. She was a longtime minister of gender, youth, and sports under Lesotho's prime minister Pakalitha Mosisili.

== Early life and education ==
Mathabiso Angeline Lepono was born in 1942 in Thibella, a village in Lesotho's Maseru District.

Due to apartheid law, her mother, a domestic worker, was not able to stay with her. so she spent her childhood living with various relatives across South Africa, from Klerksdorp to Orlando. She faced abusive environments in some of her many foster homes.

She attended school at Blessed Martin de Porres in South Africa. After completing elementary school in 1957, she returned to Lesotho with her mother. Back in Lesotho, she got a job as an office assistant at a hospital. Her supervisors enrolled her at St. Stephen's High School in Mohale's Hoek, with her work supervisor and one of her teachers funding her education. Her first introduction to politics was in this period, when she joined the Basutoland African Congress as a youth member.

Though she was offered a scholarship to study abroad in 1966, she chose to remain in Lesotho and marry Ntate Lepono. She attempted to continue her education in Lesotho but was held back by financial difficulties.

== Political career ==
Lepono entered politics as a member of the Lesotho Congress for Democracy party, at one point leading its women's league.

She first joined the cabinet of longtime prime minister Pakalitha Mosisili in 1999, appointed as minister of environment, gender, and youth affairs. In 2002 she asked to be shifted away from the environment profile, becoming minister of gender, youth, and sports.

While serving as gender minister, she oversaw passage of the Legal Capacity of Married Persons Act of 2006, which removed men's marital power over their wives and gave married women more rights, as well as the 2003 Sexual Offences Act, which recognized marital rape as a crime, among other provisions.

By 2011, Lepono was one of seven women ministers in the cabinet, alongside 'Mamphono Khaketla, Mannete Ramali, Maphoka Motoboli, Mphu Keneileo Ramatlapeng, Mpeo Mahase-Moiloa, and Pontso Suzan Matumelo Sekatle.

In early 2012, she left the party alongside Mosisili to form the Democratic Congress. She then chose not to stand in the 2012 Lesotho general election, retiring from political office that year.

For over a decade, until her retirement in 2012, she was an elected member of Lesotho's National Assembly, representing Mafeteng District's Likhoele constituency.

As a politician, Lepono is known for both her forceful oratory and her emotional response to political conflict. She has remained involved in Democratic Congress politics since her departure from office.
