= R716 (South Africa) =

Regional route in South Africa

Regional route R716

Route information
- Length: 96 km (60 mi)

Major junctions
- West end: R42 in Vanderbijlpark
- R59 near Vanderbijlpark; R82 in Viljoensdrif; R549 in Deneysville
- East end: R26 between Villiers and Frankfort

Location
- Country: South Africa
- Major cities: Vanderbijlpark, Viljoensdrif, Deneysville, Oranjeville

Highway system
- Numbered routes of South Africa
← R715	→ R717

The R716 is a Regional Route in South Africa that connects Vanderbijlpark with the R26 between Villiers and Frankfort. It passes through Deneysville and Oranjeville.

== Route ==
Its north-western terminus is a junction with the R42 in Vanderbijlpark, Gauteng (just south of Sharpeville). It goes south-east for 5.5 kilometres as Ascot-on-Vaal Road, crossing the Vaal River into the Free State and crossing the R59 highway, to reach a t-junction with the R82 at Viljoensdrif. The R716 and R82 are co-signed southwards for 1.8 kilometers before the R716 becomes its own road south-east.

From Viljoensdrif, it heads south-east for 24 kilometres to the town of Deneysville, where it meets the south-western terminus of the R549. From Deneysville, it heads south, along the western edge of the Vaal Dam. It then turns east, reaching the town of Oranjeville.

Immediately after Orangeville, it crosses the point where the Wilge River enters the Vaal Dam as the Magrieta Prinsloo Bridge, a bridge which only allows vehicles going one direction to cross it at a time (using a traffic light system). After crossing the Wilge River, it heads east-south-east, terminating at a junction with the R26, midway between Frankfort to the south and Villiers to the north.
