= R702 (South Africa) =

Regional route in South Africa

Regional route R702

Route information
- Length: 113 km (70 mi)

Major junctions
- Northwest end: N6 / M30 in Bloemfontein
- R717 in Dewetsdorp; R701 / R26 near Wepener; R26 in Wepener
- Southeast end: Van Rooyen's Gate border with Lesotho

Location
- Country: South Africa

Highway system
- Numbered routes of South Africa
← R701	→ R703

The R702 is a regional route in the Mangaung Metropolitan Municipality of South Africa that connects Bloemfontein with the Lesotho border at Van Rooyen's Gate via Dewetsdorp and Wepener.

== Route ==
Its north-western terminus is a junction with the N6 national route and M30 metropolitan route in Bloemfontein, just south of the Mangaung suburb and just east of the N6's interchange with the N1. It heads eastwards to reach a t-junction, where it meets the southern terminus of Bloemfontein's M12 metropolitan route and turns south-east.

It leaves the city heading south-east and goes for 56 kilometres to the town of Dewetsdorp, where it meets the north-eastern terminus of the R717. From the R717 junction, it continues south-east for 32 kilometres to meet the R26 and the north-eastern terminus of the R701 at a four-way-junction. It becomes co-signed with the R26 eastwards, immediately crossing the Caledon River into the town of Wepener.

South of Wepener town centre, the R702 becomes its own road northwards into the town centre as Van Aardt Street, then eastwards as Spies Street to cross the Sandspruit River. Just after Wepener Police Station, the R702 becomes the road to the south-east and goes for 8 kilometres to end at the Van Rooyen's Gate border post with Lesotho, after which the route becomes Lesotho's A20.
