= R717 (South Africa) =

Regional route in South Africa

Regional route R717

Route information
- Length: 229 km (142 mi)

Major junctions
- South end: N1 / R369 / R58 in Colesberg
- R704 at Trompsburg; N1 at Edenburg; N6 at Reddersburg
- North end: R702 near Dewetsdorp

Location
- Country: South Africa

Highway system
- Numbered routes of South Africa
← R716	→ R719

The R717 is a Regional Route in South Africa that connects Colesberg with Dewetsdorp via Trompsburg, Edenburg and Reddersburg. From Colesberg to Reddersburg, it follows the older route of the N1.

== Route ==
It south-western terminus is in Colesberg, Northern Cape, at an interchange with the N1 national route, the R369 road and the R58 road. From there, it heads north-north-east, crossing the Orange River into the Free State.

The first town it comes to is Philippolis. From this town, it heads north-east to Trompsburg. At Trompsburg, it receives the south-eastern terminus of the R704. From Trompsburg until Edenburg, the route parallels the N1. In Edenburg's town centre, it turns east-north-east, crossing the N1 and proceeding to reach the N6 just 800 m south of Reddersburg.

It is briefly cosigned with the N6, heading north, before splitting off in central Reddersburg to continue in an easterly direction, reaching its north-eastern terminus of Dewetsdorp, where it ends at a junction with the R702.
