= R702 road =

R702 road may refer to:

- R702 road (Ireland)
- R702 road (South Africa)
