= R701 (South Africa) =

Regional route in South Africa

Regional route R701

Route information
- Length: 190 km (120 mi)

Major junctions
- West end: N1 near the Gariep Dam
- R715 in Bethulie; R390 in Bethulie; N6 in Smithfield
- East end: R26 / R702 near Wepener

Location
- Country: South Africa

Highway system
- Numbered routes of South Africa
← R700	→ R702

The R701 is a regional route in the Free State, South Africa that connects Wepener with Bethulie.

== Route ==
Its western terminus is the N1 near Gariep Dam. From here, it runs east, along the northern shore of the Gariep Dam. The first town it passes through is Bethulie, where it crosses the R715 and then meets the northern terminus of the R390. From Bethulie, it heads east-north-east, and the next town it comes to is Smithfield. At Smithfield, it is briefly cosigned with the intersecting N6 heading north, before emerging to head north-east out of the town. The route ends at an intersection with the R26 and R702 west of Wepener.
