= Oranjeville =

- Location within Free State (South African province) Location within South Africa
- Coordinates: 26°59′S 28°12′E
- Country: South Africa
- Province: Free State
- District: Fezile Dabi
- Municipality: Metsimaholo

Area
  - Total: 8.57 km^{2} (3.31 sq mi)

Population (2011)
  - Total: 5,166
  - Density: 603/km^{2} (1,560/sq mi)

Racial makeup (2011)
  - Black African: 93.1%
  - Coloured: 0.3%
  - Indian/Asian: 0.3%
  - White: 6.1%
  - Other: 0.3%

First languages (2011)
  - Sotho: 72.4%
  - Zulu: 8.0%
  - Xhosa: 7.7%
  - Afrikaans: 7.1%
  - Other: 4.8%
- Time zone: UTC+2 (SAST)
- Postal code (street): 1995
- PO box: 1995
- Area code: 016

Oranjeville is a small town situated on the banks of the Wilge River in the Free State province of South Africa.

The town is on the southern bank of the Vaal Dam, 14 kilometres (9 mi) south-east of Deneysville and 46 kilometres (29 mi) north-east of Heilbron. It takes its name from the Orange Free State, Oranje-Vrystaat in Afrikaans.

It was established as a stop-over for wagoners travelling between Heilbron, Frankfort and Vereeniging. The main road passing through the town is the R716 road, called Scott Street in Oranjeville.
