= R713 road =

R713 road may refer to:

- R713 road (Ireland)
- R713 (South Africa)
