= Khomokhoana =

- Community Council
- Geographic Center of Community
- Coordinates: 28°52′55″S 27°55′54″E
- Country: Lesotho
- District: Leribe District
- Elevation: 5,338 ft (1,627 m)

Population (2006)
  - Total: 26,851
- Time zone: UTC+2 (CAT)
- Coordinates computed from Lesotho Villages file.

Khomokhoana is a community council located in the Leribe District of Lesotho. Its population in 2006 was 26,851.

== Villages ==
The community of Khomokhoana includes the villages of

Ha Moholisa
Ha Chaka
Ha Chonapase
Ha Kena
Ha 'Mathata
Ha 'Mathata (Ha Felaphe)
Ha 'Mathata (Sekoting)

Ha 'Mathata (Temong)
Ha Matsoete
Ha Motlalehi
Ha Nyenye
Ha Nyenye (Korosong)
Ha Nyenye (Likoting)

Ha Nyenye (Thoteng)
Kholokoe
Khomo-Lia-Oela
Maputsoe
Matikiring
Popopo
Taung
