= Metsimaholo Local Municipality =

Coordinates: 26.8167°S 27.8167°E

Metsimaholo
- Local municipality
- Seal

- Location in the Free State
- Country: South Africa
- Province: Free State
- District: Fezile Dabi
- Seat: Sasolburg
- Wards: 23

Government
  - Type: Municipal council
  - Mayor: Jack Malindi (AIC)

Area
  - Total: 1,717 km^{2} (663 sq mi)

Population (2022)
  - Total: 158,391
  - Density: 92.25/km^{2} (238.9/sq mi)

Racial makeup (2022)
  - Black African: 85.1%
  - Coloured: 0.8%
  - Indian/Asian: 0.3%
  - White: 13.9%

First languages (2011)
  - Sotho: 59.9%
  - Afrikaans: 16.7%
  - Xhosa: 7.6%
  - Zulu: 6.0%
  - Other: 9.8%
- Time zone: UTC+2 (SAST)
- Municipal code: FS204

Metsimaholo Municipality (Sotho: Masepala wa Metsimaholo; Afrikaans: Metsimaholo Munisipaliteit) is a local municipality within the Fezile Dabi District Municipality, in the Free State province of South Africa. Metsimaholo means "big water" in Sesotho.

== Main places ==
The 2001 census divided the municipality into the following main places:

Place	Code	Area (km^{2})	Population	Most spoken language
Bertha Village	41901	0.58	666	Sotho
Coalbrook	41902	0.69	30	Xhosa
Deneysville	41903	6.50	1,124	Afrikaans
Holly Country	41904	0.93	614	Afrikaans
Metsimaholo	41914	0.79	3,193	Sotho
Oranjeville	41906	7.73	297	Afrikaans
Refengkgotso	41907	5.65	13,792	Sotho
Richmond Valley	41908	0.37	209	Afrikaans
Sasolburg	41909	49.82	24,568	Afrikaans
Taaibos	41910	1.50	1,301	Afrikaans
Vaal Power	41911	0.65	798	Sotho
Viljoensdrif	41912	2.49	589	Sotho
Zamdela	41913	10.21	57,070	Sotho
Remainder of the municipality	41905	1,651.37	11,723	Sotho

== Politics ==
The municipal council consists of forty-six members elected by mixed-member proportional representation. Twenty-three councillors are elected by first-past-the-post voting in twenty-three wards, while the remaining twenty-three are chosen from party lists so that the total number of party representatives is proportional to the number of votes received.

In the election of 4 November 2026, no party won a majority on the council. The ANC won the largest number of seats.

The following table shows the results of the election.

Party	Ward			List			Total seats
Party	Votes	%	Seats	Votes	%	Seats	Total seats
African National Congress	15,237	27.58	17	15,296	27.75	0	17
Democratic Alliance	15,118	27.36	5	15,179	27.54	6	11
Economic Freedom Fighters	6,458	11.69	1	6,540	11.87	4	5
Service Movement for Metsimaholo	6,192	11.21	0	6,159	11.17	5	5
Freedom Front Plus	4,180	7.56	0	4,209	7.64	3	3
ActionSA	1,420	2.57	0	1,680	3.05	1	1
African Congress for Transformation	1,266	2.29	0	1,074	1.95	1	1
South African Communist Party	1,007	1.82	0	856	1.55	1	1
Metsimaholo Community Association	544	0.98	0	584	1.06	1	1
African Transformation Movement	426	0.77	0	456	0.83	1	1
23 other parties	3,408	6.17	0	3,085	5.60	0	0
Total	55,256	100.00	23	55,118	100.00	23	46
Valid votes	55,256	98.20		55,118	98.16		
Invalid/blank votes	1,015	1.80		1,031	1.84		
Total votes	56,271	100.00		56,149	100.00		
Registered voters/turnout	109,208	51.53		109,208	51.41		
