= Matlameng =

- Community Council
- Geographic Center of Community
- Coordinates: 28°58′46″S 28°18′06″E
- Country: Lesotho
- District: Leribe District
- Elevation: 6,371 ft (1,942 m)

Population (2006)
  - Total: 10,238
- Time zone: UTC+2 (CAT)
- Coordinates computed from Lesotho Villages file.

Matlameng is a community council located in the Leribe District of Lesotho. Its population in 2006 was 10,238.

== Villages ==
The community of Matlameng includes the villages of Ha Fako, Ha Koasa, Ha Koebu, Ha Lelia, Ha Letele, Ha Liphapang, Ha Mahlehle, Ha Makibinyane, Ha Mashongoane, Ha Matsa (Nkoeng), Ha Mokemane, Ha Mokhubu, Ha Mokopotsa, Ha Mokoroane, Ha Moshoeshoe, Ha Motsatsa, Ha Rankhelepe, Ha Letsie, Ha Sankoela, Ha Sekeleme, Ha Sekhonyana, Ha Sephokoana, Hata-Butle, Lekhoathakhoatha, Makhanfole (Nkoeng), Maqalika, Ntširele, Papalala, Phalole (Nkoeng), Qophello, Sebala-Bala (Nkoeng) and Tšenola.

== Rivers ==
Matlameng has two rivers, Morotong and Morotoaneng.

== Education ==
there are seven Primary schools in Matlameng, Matlameng primary school, Nkola primary school, Chabatsane Primary School, Nkoeng Primary, Potsane Primary, Sefapanong Primary and Hasekhonyana primary.

Matlameng have one High School, Chabatsane Secondary School.
