= Thaba-Phatšoa =

Thaba-Phatsoa is a village south of Hlotse in the Leribe District of Lesotho. It is also the namesake of the constituency. It is located at coordinates 28.9918269°S 28.1365660°E. The Fenyane, Motati, and Litjotjela community councils are located in this constituency. Schools include Thaba-Phatsoa LEC and Thaba-Phatsoa RC primary schools.

The area includes a police station, a health clinic, and the Thaba-Phatsoa irrigation scheme.

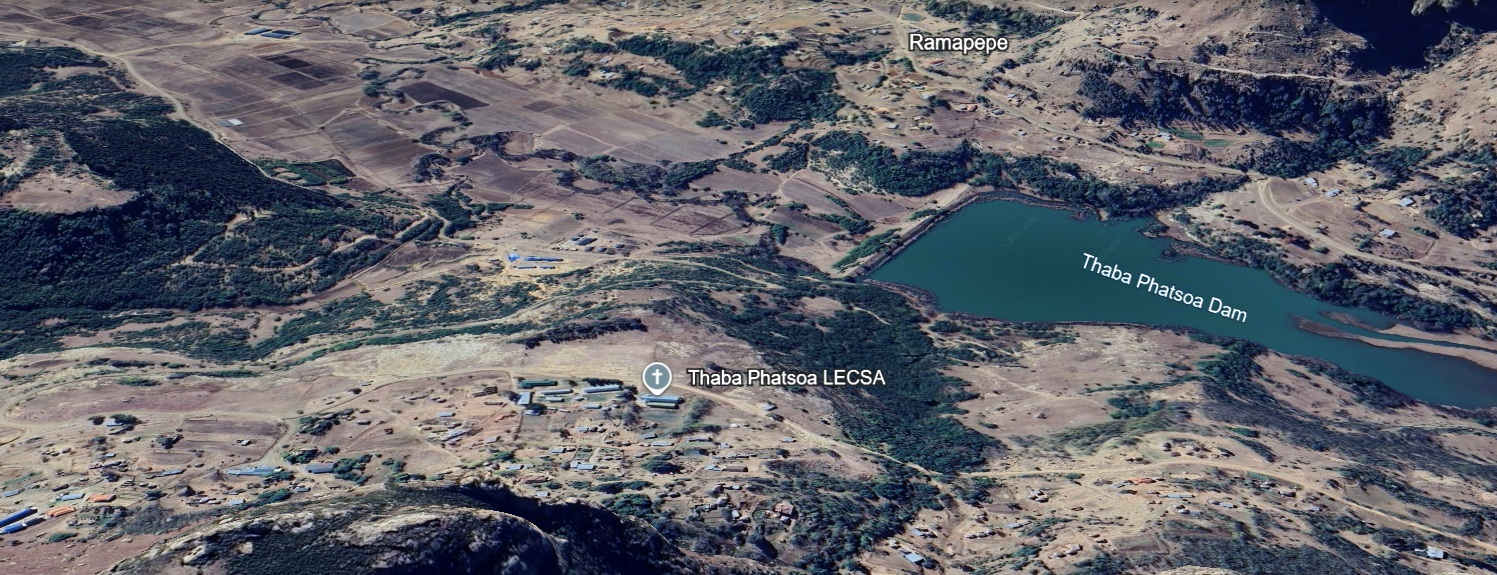
Thaba-Phatsoa Village

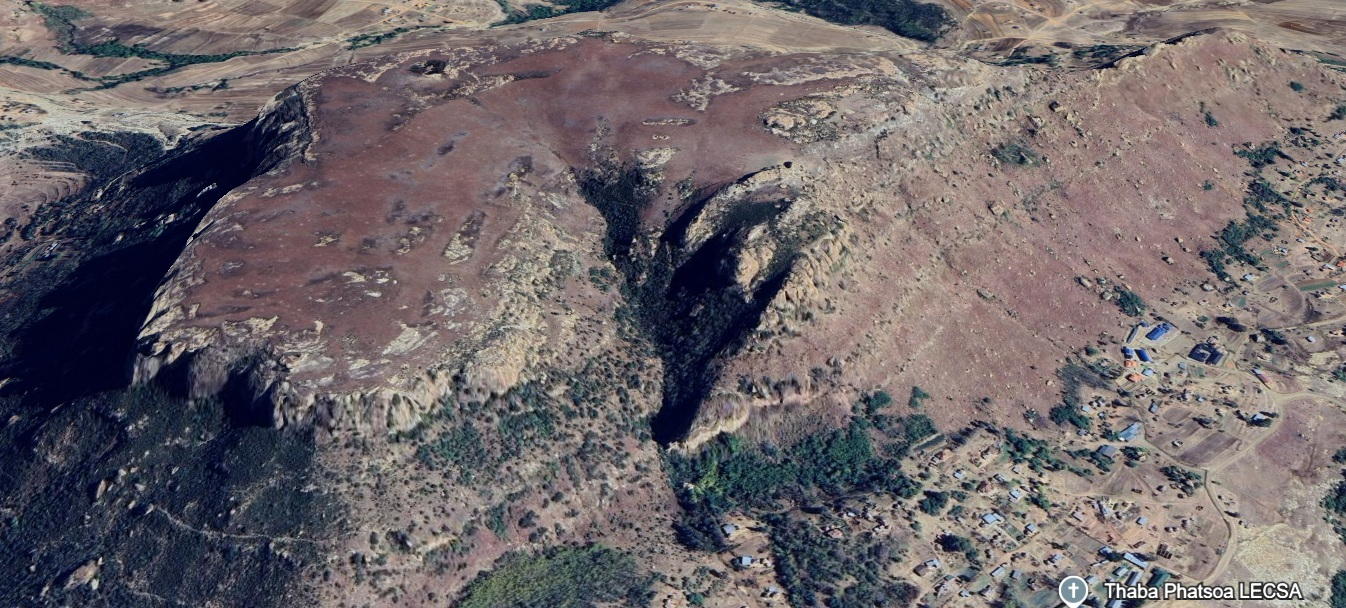
Thaba-Phatsoa Plateau

The plateau almost resembles an African continent from above.

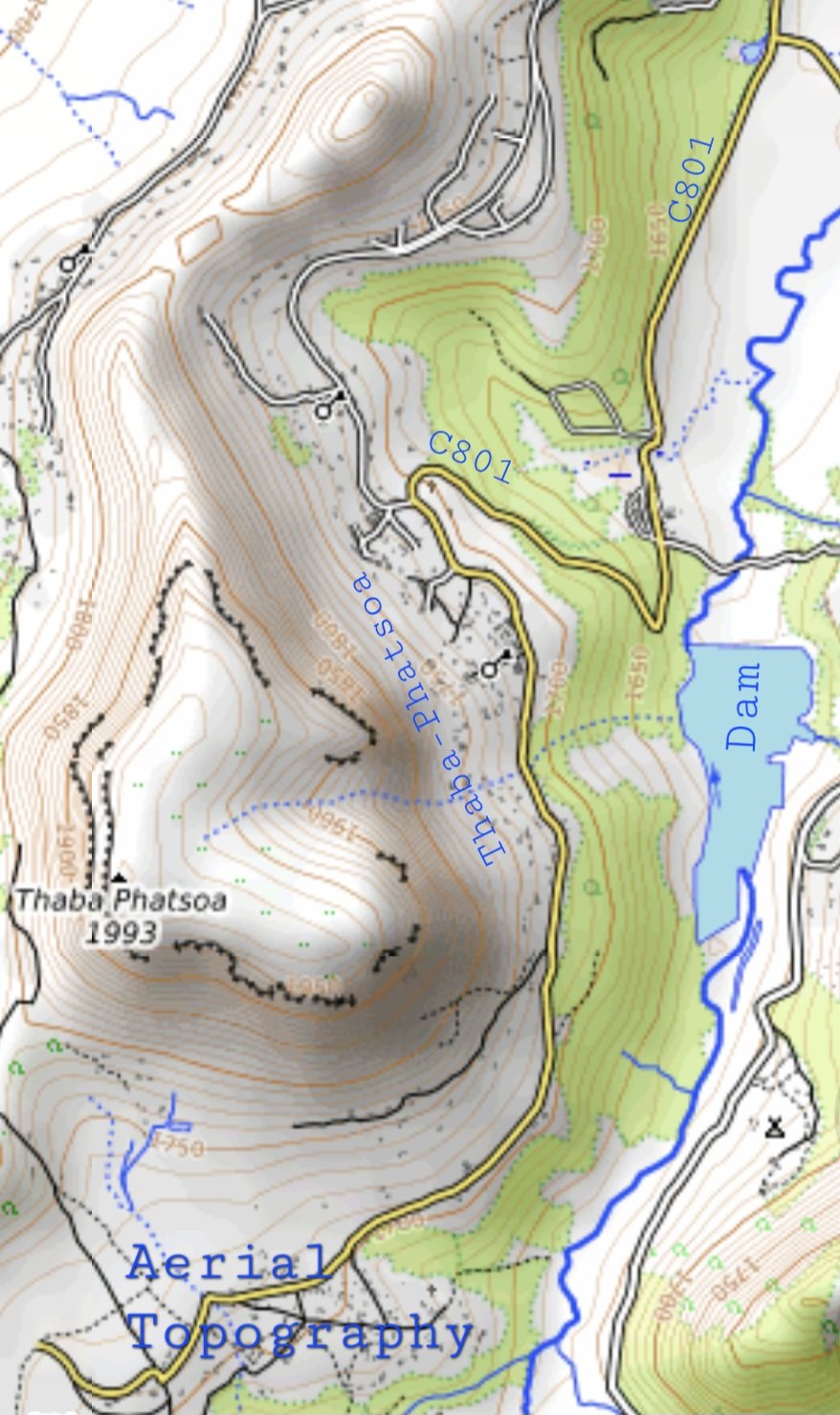
Thaba-Phatsoa aerial topography

== History ==
The village was founded by Chief Khethisa I near the current Lionel Collet Dam (also known as Thaba-Phatsoa Dam) in the foothills of Thaba-Phatsoa mountain which stands at 1993m elevation. Lionel Collet was a colonial irrigation and agricultural officer in the former Basutoland. In 2015, it had a population of approximately 20,404 within an area of 185 square kilometres (71 sq mi).

Thaba-Phatsoa is named after a prominent white sandstone cliff of the Clarens Formation, complemented by dark vegetation on the mountain.

== Notable people ==
- Bishop David Ramela – Philanthropist and businessman.
- Manketekete Nketekete – Local Councillor
- Thabo Maretlane – Entrepreneur and Politician (Member of Parliament)
