= Manka, Lesotho =

Manka
- Community Council
- Geographic Center of Community
- Coordinates: 28°59′38″S 27°49′17″E
- Country: Lesotho
- District: Leribe District
- Elevation: 6,033 ft (1,839 m)

Population (2006)
  - Total: 20,693
- Time zone: UTC+2 (CAT)
- Coordinates computed from Lesotho Villages file.

Manka is a community council that is located in the Leribe District of Lesotho. Its population in 2006 was 20,693.

== Villages ==
The community of Manka includes the villages of:

1. Ha 'Musi,
2. Ha Eleke (Peka),
3. Ha Fako,
4. Ha Foka,
5. Ha Hlaname,
6. Ha Keenya,
7. Ha Kotola,
8. Ha Leburu,
9. Ha Leburu (Peka),
10. Ha Lechesa,
11. Ha Lepholisa,
12. Ha Letsika,
13. Ha Liteboho,
14. Ha Mabote,
15. Ha Mahlomola (Tabola),
16. Ha Makoae (Liphakoeng),
17. Ha Malebo,
18. Ha Marana,
19. Ha Masakale,
20. Ha Mashape,
21. Ha Mokhethi,
22. Ha Mokhomo (Tabola),
23. Ha Mokhoro,
24. Ha Mokhosi (Fobane),
25. Ha Monnanyane,
26. Ha Monyane,
27. Ha Mosae,
28. Ha Mosamo,
29. Ha Motako,
30. Ha Motlau,
31. Ha Mpeke,
32. Ha Mpetsana (Fobane),
33. Ha Napo,
34. Ha Napo (Hlokoa-Lelle),
35. Ha Nkokoane,
36. Ha Ntahli,
37. Ha Patsa,
38. Ha Qhomane,
39. Ha Ralebona,
40. Ha Ralikariki,
41. Ha Ramaboella,
42. Ha Ramochana,
43. Ha Ramohai,
44. Ha Ramohapi,
45. Ha Ramosalla,
46. Ha Rantho,
47. Ha Rantuba,
48. Ha Seetsa,
49. Ha Thipane,
50. Ha Tjopa,
51. Ha Tjopa (Peka),
52. Ha Tšiea,
53. Ha Tumo (Fobane),
54. Masaleng (Peka),
55. Molumong,
56. Motimposo (Peka) and
57. Nkanyane.
