= Maisa-Phoka =

- Community Council
- Geographic Center of Community
- Coordinates: 28°46′48″S 28°12′21″E
- Country: Lesotho
- District: Leribe District
- Elevation: 5,617 ft (1,712 m)

Population (2006)
  - Total: 12,630
- Time zone: UTC+2 (CAT)
- Coordinates computed from Lesotho Villages file.

Maisa-Phoka is a community council located in the Leribe District of Lesotho. Its population in 2006 was 12,630.

== Villages ==
The community of Maisa-Phoka includes the villages of Futhong, Ha Libenyane, Ha Makakamela (Nkoeng), Ha Makhobalo (Losemaecheri), Ha Mashili, Ha Mokotjo, Ha Molapo, Ha Morallana (Tlhakoli), Ha Motšoane, Ha Phiri (Fing), Ha Seheshe (Tlhakoli), Ha Teketsi, Ha Thaba, Ha Totoloane, Kotope, Letsatseng (Tlhakoli), Letsoapong (Liphofung), Letsoapong (Matlakeng), Likoting, Linokong, Liphakoeng (Ha Mashili), Literapeng, Mahana-Puso, Makhasane, Maruatona, Matlakeng, Matomokong (Tlhakoli), Metsoaneng, Mohlanapeng, Moreneng (Matlakeng), Naleli, Nkoeng (Ha Makakamela), Poping (Tlhakoli), Sekhutloaneng (Tlhakoli), Taung (Ha Rampai), Thabana-Tšooana, Thotaneng, Thotaneng (Liphofung) and Thotaneng (Matlakeng).
