= Fenyane =

- Community Council
- Geographic Center of Community
- Coordinates: 29°02′13″S 28°08′22″E
- Country: Lesotho
- District: Leribe District
- Elevation: 6,043 ft (1,842 m)

Population (2006)
  - Total: 10,271
- Time zone: UTC+2 (CAT)
- Coordinates computed from Lesotho Villages file.

Fenyane is a community council located in the Leribe District of Lesotho. Its population in 2006 was 10,271.

== Villages ==
The community of Fenyane includes the villages of

Ha 'Mamalo
Ha 'Nena
Ha 'Nyane
Ha Chale
Ha Fako (Lipetu)
Ha Lefoleri
Ha Letseka
Ha Mahooana
Ha Makhobalo
Ha Malekutu
Ha Malotha

Ha Mamotjapela
Ha Mapoto
Ha Maroala
Ha Mathai
Ha Matoli (Thaba-Phatsoa)
Ha Matona
Ha Mohlobolotso
Ha Mokhachane
Ha Mosuoane
Ha Ntasi
Ha Nthathakane

Ha Phakiso
Ha Phelane
Ha Raliee
Ha Ramapepe
Ha Ranthaele
Ha Sekoala
Ha Teisi
Ha Tsae (Thaba-Phatsoa)
Ha Tšepe
Liboping
Likhahleng (Lipetu)

Likhopeng
Likileng
Lipetu
Mafoling (Ha Tšepe)
Mahlabatheng
Maphotong
Thaba-Lesoba
Thella Boy
Thota-Khubelu (Lipetu)
Thoteng (Ha Tšepe)
