= Limamarela =

- Community Council
- Geographic Center of Community
- Coordinates: 29°10′21″S 28°25′10″E
- Country: Lesotho
- District: Leribe District
- Elevation: 9,633 ft (2,936 m)

Population (2006)
  - Total: 8,733
- Time zone: UTC+2 (CAT)
- Coordinates computed from Lesotho Villages file.

Limamarela is a community council located in the Leribe District of Lesotho. Its population in 2006 was 8,733.

== Villages ==
The community of Limamarela includes the villages of Ha Jakalasi, Ha Joma, Ha Konstabole, Ha Lejone, Ha Lukase, Ha Masokotso, Ha Matšoele, Ha Mohanyane, Ha Mpeli, Ha Noha, Ha Paepae (Mpakatheng), Ha Rafanyane, Ha Sebotha, Ha Sefako, Ha Sekhele, Ha Semela, Ha Sepinare, Ha Thibeli, Ha Thoora (Ha Mallane), Ha Tšepo, Khohloaneng, Khubetsoana, Kobong (Ha Mallane), Lehlakaneng, Lepaqoa, Makhalong, Mamohau, Maphutseng, Masuoaneng and Thoteng (Ha Sebotha).
