= R714 (South Africa) =

Regional route in South Africa

Regional route R714

Route information
- Length: 76.7 km (47.7 mi)

Location
- Country: South Africa

Highway system
- Numbered routes of South Africa
← R713	→ R715

The R714 is a Regional Route in South Africa.

== Route ==
The R714 begins at a T-junction with the R26 in Bethlehem (north-east of the town centre). From Bethlehem, it runs east-north-east for 34.7 km to reach a junction with the R57. It continues east-north-east for another 42 km to reach its end in the town of Warden at a junction with the N3.
