= Linare =

- Community Council
- Geographic Center of Community
- Coordinates: 28°51′30″S 28°06′21″E
- Country: Lesotho
- District: Leribe District
- Elevation: 5,781 ft (1,762 m)

Population (2006)
  - Total: 24,713
- Time zone: UTC+2 (CAT)
- Coordinates computed from Lesotho Villages file.

Linare is a community council located in the Leribe District of Lesotho. Its population in 2006 was 24,713.

== Villages ==
The community of Linare includes the villages of Borantisi (Khanyane), Fothane, Ha 'Malesaoana, Ha Kabelo (Likoting), Ha Kampa, Ha Kheola, Ha Khoarai, Ha Lebake, Ha Lepoqo, Ha Makhabo (Sebothoane), Ha Makoko (Khanyane), Ha Maphika (Sebothoane), Ha Matata, Ha Mohale, Ha Mokoko, Ha Molatoli (Khobotlong), Ha Molibeli, Ha Molibetsane, Ha Moliboea (Khanyane), Ha Monki, Ha Mphuthing (Sebothoane), Ha Ntsutsu, Ha Patlo, Ha Phephetho (Khanyane), Ha Sekota, Ha Setsumi, Ha Setsumi, Ha Tiela, Ha Tlai-Tlai, Ha Tsenase (Khanyane), Ha Tsotelo, Khokhotsaneng (Khanyane), Konkotia (Khanyane), Letsoapong (Ha Monki), Lisemeng, Mankoaneng, Maqhaoe (Ha Timitia), Masaleng, Ntloana-Tšoana (Khanyane), Sheba, Subeng, Temong, Thabana-Ea-Matsa, Tlai-Tlai Race Course and Tsifa-Li-Mali.
