= Ntšeliseng 'Masechele Khaketla =

Mosotho playwright and teacher (1918–2012)

- Born: Ntšeliseng Caroline Ramolahloane; 1 January 1918; Ha Majara, Berea, Basutoland
- Died: 16 August 2012 (aged 94); Maseru, Lesotho
- Education: University of Fort Hare (BA)
- Occupations: Playwright; poet; short story writer; literary translator; teacher
- Spouse: Bennett Makalo Khaketla (m. 1946; died 2000)
- Children: 6, including 'Mamphono Khaketla
- Writing career
- Notable work: Mosali eo u 'neileng eena (1954)

Ntšeliseng 'Masechele Khaketla (born Ntšeliseng Caroline Ramolahloane; 1 January 1918 – 16 August 2012) was a pioneering Sesotho-language playwright, poet, short fiction writer, literary translator, and teacher from Lesotho. Khaketla achieved several notable firsts, including becoming the first Mosotho woman to earn a bachelor's degree when she graduated with a BA from the University of Fort Hare in 1941. In the following decade, Khaketla became the third published female Sesotho-language creative writer and the first published female Sesotho-language playwright with the appearance of her play Mosali eo u 'neileng eena (1954).

Khaketla also co-founded the first private school in Lesotho, Iketsetseng Primary School, and became the first woman to be appointed as a high court assessor.

Despite receiving little academic attention during her life, she is now regarded as one of the founding figures in Sesotho literature.

== Life ==
Map of Berea District, Lesotho

Ntšeliseng Caroline Ramolahloane was born on 1 January 1918 at Ha Majara, in Berea District of what was then Basutoland. Her father, Luka Ramolahloane, was a teacher, and her mother, 'Maphillip Ramolahloane, was a housewife. She was one of eight children, and brought up in privileged surroundings due to her father's job. As a child, she read the English and Sesotho books that were in the family home, and aspired to be a nurse. Her early education was at schools in Liphiring and Siloe in Mohale's Hoek District.

Khaketla went on to Morija College in 1933 and became upon her completion of her studies in 1936, the first Mosotho woman to complete a junior certificate. She then continued her studies at the University of Fort Hare (then South African Native College at Fort Hare), where she became the first Mosotho woman to graduate, obtaining a Bachelor of Arts degree in English and Sesotho, in 1941, having completed her studies the previous year. A year later she began a teaching career at missionary schools run by the Paris Evangelical Missionary Society and then at Basutoland High School in Maseru where she became deputy principal. It was while she was in Maseru that she met her husband, Bennett Makalo Khaketla. They had six children, including 'Mamphono Khaketla. The couple lived in exile in South Africa between 1950 and 1953 due to his political activities.

We used to have our own Sesotho religion you know. It was a practical one. People looked after each other because if not, they feared the ancestors were watching. Christianity now says you just don the uniform and go to church on Sunday and the rest of the week doesn't matter. But what is your religion worth if you can't put it into action? Even just a little bit, like cleaning up or smearing mud.

— Khaketla, on traditional religion and Christian ideals

By the 1960s, Khaketla had co-founded Iketsetseng Primary School, the first private school in the country that would grow to over 1,000 pupils and educate the future Queen 'Mamohato and her son, later Letsie III. In 1979, she was the first woman appointed as a High Court assessor and also served on the council of the National University of Lesotho, the government's National Planning Board, and on the Special Committee on the Status of Women on the Law Reform Commission. Elsewhere, she was active within the Anglican Church and its Mothers' Union, and in 1990 co-founded the Lesotho Academy of Arts. Khaketla received an honorary doctorate of literature from the National University in 1983, and in 1997 received the Gold Record of Achievement award from the American Biographical Institute.

Khaketla died of renal failure on 16 August 2012 at Maseru Hospital. After her death, she was honoured with a mass at the Anglican Cathedral of St Mary and St James in Maseru, before being burial in Kokobela Cemetery.

== Writing ==
Khaketla published thirteen full-length works during her lifetime, all of them in Sesotho, including eight plays, three poetry collections, one short fiction collection and a Sesotho-language translation of Walter Trobisch's 1971 English-language book, I Married You.

The language is exceptionally good idiomatic Sotho; the dialogue living and humorous. The author has not been afraid to use foreign words that have become part of Southern Sotho. As her first published work, this book is encouraging, and it is to be hoped that it will not only spur her on for further attempts but will also encourage other Sotho women to turn their thoughts to writing.

— Sophonia Machabe Mofokeng, on "Mosali eo u ’neileng eena"

While Khaketla is often regarded as the first woman to be published in Lesotho, her debut, Mosali eo u ’neileng eena, appeared three years after Emely Amy Selemeng Mokorosi's 1951 poetry collection, Bolebali. This was to be Mokorosi's only book, and has been overshadowed by Khaketla's publications.

Mosali eo u ’neileng eena, or "The woman you gave me", is a biblical reference to the fall of man, and reflects Khaketla's frustration with men blaming their mistakes on their wives. It tells the story of a shell-shocked seminarian who returns to Lesotho from the First World War, and the work has been described as a "pioneering psychological romance".

While I'm gone, white mother, kill the fattened oxen

And feed your dear ones well, prime meat and curds

Overspilling so the dogs too lap the juice,

And still enough is left to throw a surplus

To your close kin across the seas.

And you, black mother, hold firm –

There is a mystery in things to come

And a fierce look lights behind your eyes.

As the world-ball turns around and round

The fleeing partridge finds the forbidden grain.

— Khaketla, "The White and the Black"

Khaketla then turned to poetry, with a collection titled 'Mantsopa, which was published by Oxford University Press in 1963. The collection is dedicated to her child, Matsoso Lesuhlana, who died in infancy. Some of the poems from 'Mantsopa were later included in a collection of Basotho writers, published as Lemuloana in 1971. In 1976, an English-language translation by Daniel Kunene and Jack Cope of the eleventh stanza of a poem from 'Mantsopa, "Molelekeng", was included in Joanna Bankier's The Other Voice: Twentieth-century Women's Poetry in Translation, under the title "The White and the Black". It later appeared in Daughters of Africa (1992; reprint 1993), edited by Margaret Busby.

Khaketla continued to self-publish her works throughout the 1970s and, less prolifically, the 1980s and 1990s. In the mid-1990s, Maskew Miller Longman republished Selibelo sa Nkhono for the South African market.

Despite Khaketla's work spanning Lesotho's colonial and post-colonial eras, she received scant attention from Western academics or later African-language writers during her lifetime. One of the few interviews on record from her most productive period was with the Voice of America's Lee Nichols for VOA's "Conversations with African Writers" series, but this was omitted from the published collection that appeared in 1981. Nevertheless, portions of that interview were quoted in Nichols's 1984 book, African Writers at the Microphone.

== Bibliography ==
=== Plays ===
- Mosali eo u 'neileng eena. Morija Sesuto Book Depot. 1954.
- Pelo ea monna. Self-published. 1976.
- Ka u lotha?. Self-published. 1976.
- Mahlopha-a-senya. Self-published. 1977.
- Ho isa lefung. Self-published. 1977.
- Molekane ea tšoanang le eena. Self-published. 1978.
- Khotsoaneng. Morija Sesuto Book Depot. 1986.
- Selibelo sa Nkhono. Maskew Miller Longman South Africa/Self-published. 1995.

=== Poetry ===
- 'Mantsopa. Oxford University Press South Africa. 1963.
- Molamu oa Kotjane. Self-published. 1993.
- Maoelana a Hlompho. Self-published. 2002.

=== Short fiction ===
- Mosiuoa Masilo. Self-published. 1980.

=== Translations ===
- U mohats'a ka. Morija Sesuto Book Depot. 1973. [Sesotho-language translation of Walter Trobisch's I Married You (1971)]

=== Anthologies ===
- Joanna Bankier (1976). The Other Voice: Twentieth-Century Women's Poetry in Translation New York: Norton. ISBN 978-0-393-04421-8
- A. B. Thoahlane, A. B. (1971). Lemuloana: Pokello ea thothokiso tsa Sesotho (in Southern Sotho). Johannesburg: Longman Southern Africa

== Sources ==
- Epprecht, Marc (1993). "Domesticity and Piety in Colonial Lesotho: The Private Politics of Basotho Women's Pious Associations". Journal of Southern African Studies. 19 (2): 202–224. doi:10.1080/03057079308708357. JSTOR 2637343.
- Fort Hare Graduation Ceremony and Opening of New Women's Hostel. 1941. p. 3. Archived from the original on 16 May 2026.
- Kerr, David (2004). "Southern Africa". In Banham, Martin (ed.). A History of Theatre in Africa. Cambridge: Cambridge University Press. pp. 265–311. ISBN 978-1-139-45149-9.
- Kunene, Daniel P. (1984). "N.M. Khaketla, Poet and Humanist". Concerning Poetry. 17 (2): 3–24.
- Kunene, Daniel P. (1991). "Language, Literature and the Struggle for Liberation in South Africa". African Literature Today. 7: 37–50. ISBN 978-0-86543-214-7.
- Maphike, Pule Ranaileng Stephen (1991). History of Southern Sotho literature as system, 1930–1960 (PhD). University of South Africa.
- Monyakane, Mabolaeng Thato (2016a). "NM Khaketla as the first woman in the promotion and development of Sesotho literature". South African Journal of African Languages. 36 (2): 209–216. doi:10.1080/02572117.2016.1252022. S2CID 158000341.
- ‘Muso, Tsokolo (1996). "Notes and News". African Music. 7 (3): 152–154. JSTOR 30250252.
- Motsoeli, Ntsebeng (18 August 2012). "Veteran educationist Khaketla dies". Sunday Express. Maseru. Archived from the original on 5 May 2023.
- Newell Rowan, Diana (1979). "Speaking in a common language". Sojourner. 4 (7): 16–17.
- Lesotho, Maseru, Interview with Mrs. Ntšeliseng Masechele Khaketla, 1976 (Sound tape reel). Interviewed by Lee Nichols. Maseru: Voice of America. 14 September 1976.
- Nichols, Lee (1981). Conversations with African Writers. Washington, D.C.: Voice of America.
- Rosenberg, Scott; Weisfelder, Richard F. (2013). Historical Dictionary of Lesotho. Scarecrow Press. ISBN 978-0-8108-7982-9.
- Sheldon, Kathleen (2016). Historical Dictionary of Women in Sub-Saharan Africa. Rowman & Littlefield Publishers. ISBN 978-1-4422-6293-5.
