= Serupane =

- Community Council
- Geographic Center of Community
- Coordinates: 28°56′56″S 28°08′52″E
- Country: Lesotho
- District: Leribe District
- Elevation: 5,075 ft (1,547 m)

Population (2006)
  - Total: 11,328
- Time zone: UTC+2 (CAT)
- Coordinates computed from Lesotho Villages file.

Serupane is a community council located in the Leribe District of Lesotho. Its population in 2006 was 11,328.

== Villages ==
The community of Serupane includes the villages of Ha Botilo (Mahobong), Ha Joang (Mahobong), Ha Khojane, Ha Kurata (Likhotolieng), Ha Lesiamo, Ha Lobiane, Ha Mahala, Ha Makoatsela (Likhotolieng), Ha Mapeshoane (Mahobong), Ha Mokausi (Mahobong), Ha Moqhathinyane, Ha Moseli, Ha Mosito, Ha Ramajake (Likhotolieng), Ha Seeiso (Mahobong), Ha Setene, Ha Thekoane, Ha Tlelase (Somololo), Ha Tota (Mahobong), Litloeleng (Somololo), Majakaneng (Mahobong), Makhoaneng, Mapholaneng (Somololo), Mohope, Naleli and Somololo.
