= Peka Bridge =

Peka Bridge is a border post located between South Africa and Lesotho.

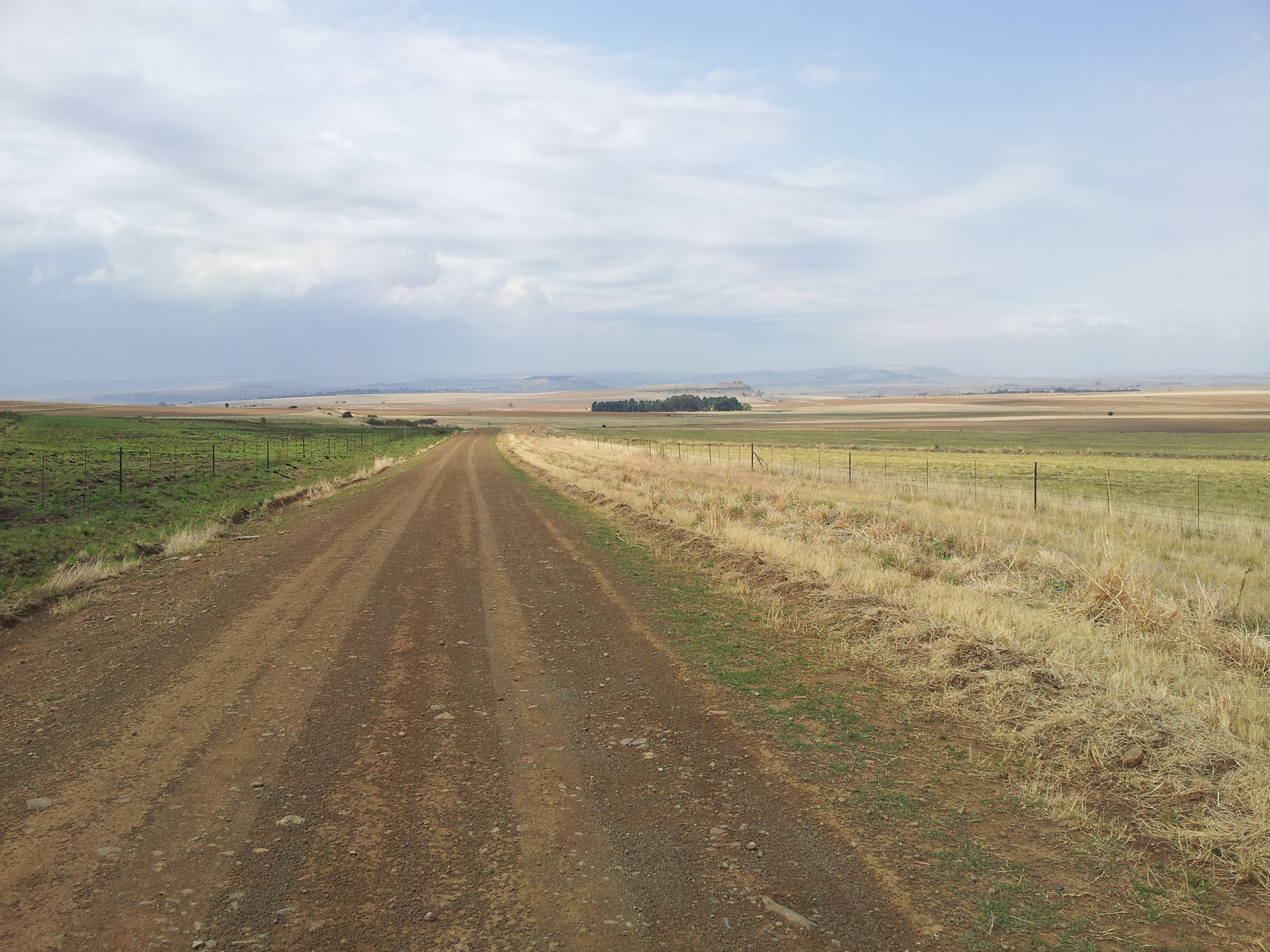
Road on the South African Side

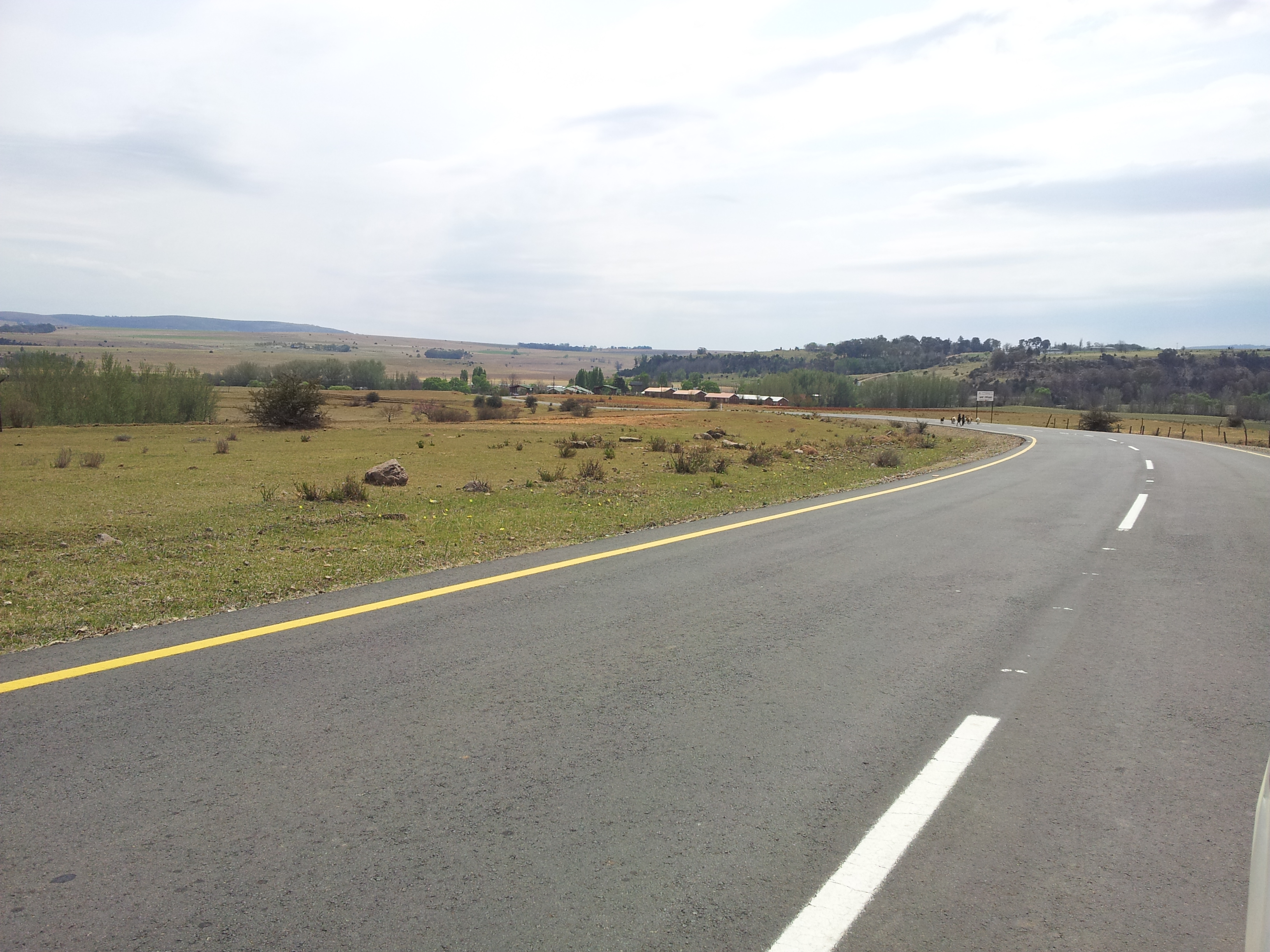
Road on the Lesotho Side

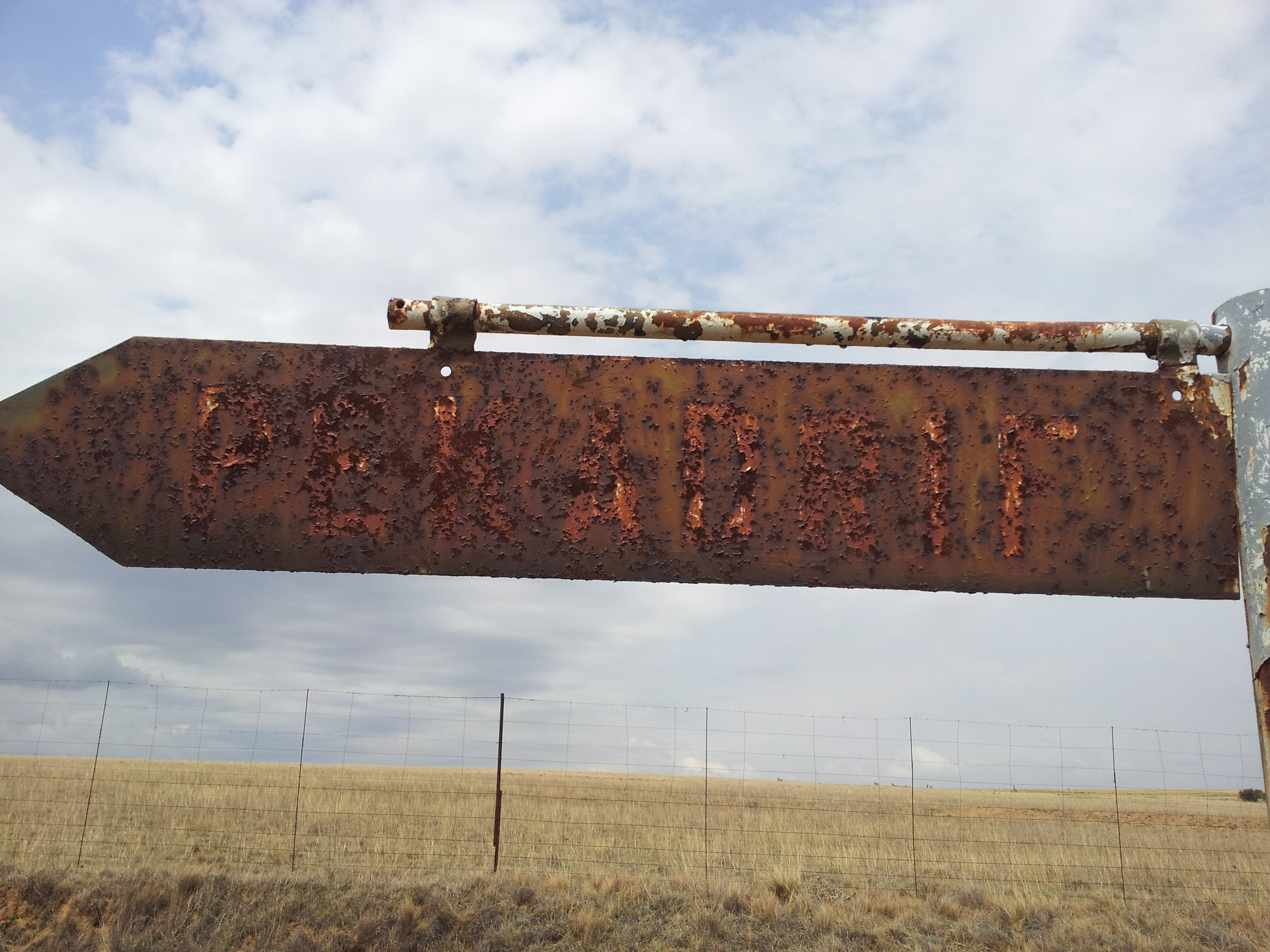
Old Sign To Peka Bridge

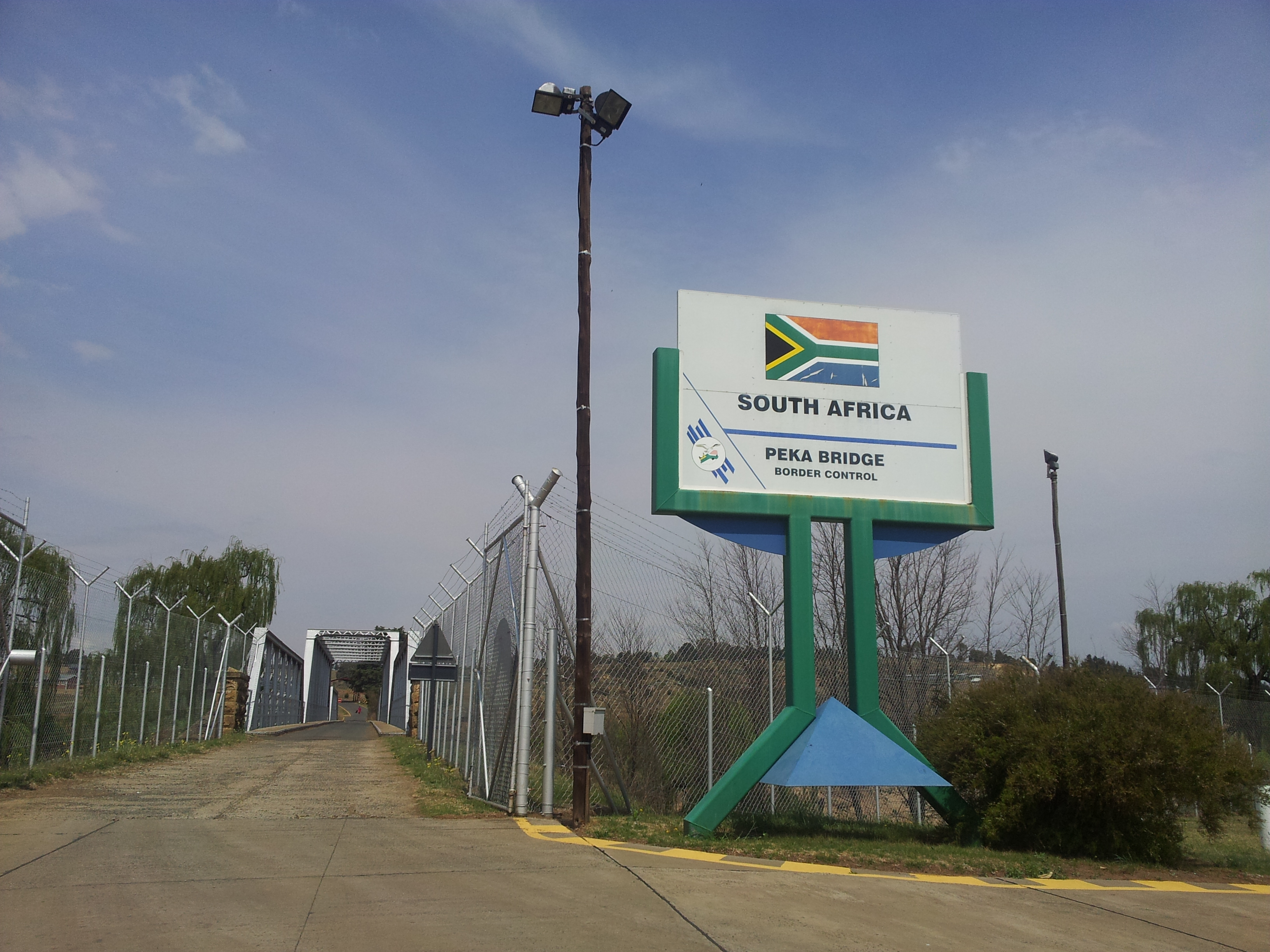
Border Post on the South African Side

	South Africa	Lesotho
Region	Free State	Leribe
City	Ficksburg	Peka
Road		
GPS Coordinates	28.944°S 27.7338°E	28.9467°S 27.7357°E
Telephone number	+27 (0)51 933 4065	
Fax number	+27 (0)51 933 5353	
SAPS	+27 (0)51 933 1908	
Postal address		
Business hours Travellers	08:00 - 16:00	08:00 - 16:00
Business hours General	08:00 - 16:00	
