= Tsoilitsoili =

- Community Council
- Geographic Center of Community
- Coordinates: 29°02′33″S 27°44′37″E
- Country: Lesotho
- District: Leribe District
- Elevation: 5,253 ft (1,601 m)

Population (2006)
  - Total: 18,456
- Time zone: UTC+2 (CAT)
- Coordinates computed from Lesotho Villages file.

Tsoilitsoili is a community council located in the Leribe District of Lesotho. Its population in 2006 was 18,456.

== Villages ==
The community of Tsoili-tsoili includes the villages of Ha 'Nena (Kolonyama), Ha 'Noko, Ha Botsane, Ha Jobo, Ha Leboea, Ha Lepapa, Ha Lintša, Ha Makhaketsa, Ha Makhula, (Kronstaad)Ha Manama, Ha Maphomane (Manganeng), Ha Masimole, Ha Matala, Ha Mofeli, Ha Mohai, Ha Mohlokaqala, Ha Mokati, Ha Molelle, Ha Molipa, Ha Moqathinyane, Ha Moramang, Ha Motlokoa, Ha Nkhabu, Ha Ntseke, Ha Ntsekele, Ha Polile, Ha Polisa, Ha Rafelile (Manganeng), Ha Rakobeli, Ha Rakolo, Ha Ralehlatsa, Ha Rampa (Manganeng), Ha Ratšita, Ha Senyeke, Ha Setšabi, Ha Thokoa, Ha Tlalinyane, Ha Tokoto, Ha Tumo, Likatseng, Makhalong and Sekhutlong.

== Education ==
The Little Flower Primary School in the village of Kolonyama serves 340 children while the nursery school serves 15. Children are taught psychologically, spiritually, academically and socially.

== Health Care ==
The Little Flower Health Centre in the village of Kolonyama provides outpatient, well baby clinic, home and school visits, village health workers and even an occasional delivery of a newborn.
