= R715 (South Africa) =

Regional route in South Africa

Regional route R715

Route information
- Maintained by FSDPRT
- Length: 31.9 km (19.8 mi)

Major junctions
- North-west end: N1 in Springfontein
- R701 in Bethulie
- South-east end: R390 in Bethulie

Location
- Country: South Africa
- Major cities: Springfontein, Bethulie

Highway system
- Numbered routes of South Africa
← R714	→ R716

The R715 is a Regional Route in Free State, South Africa that connects Springfontein with Bethulie.

== Route ==
Its north-western terminus is the N1 at Springfontein, south of the town centre. From Springfontein, it runs south-east, to Bethulie, where it meets the R701 before passing through the town centre. It turns eastwards in the town centre to reach its end at a junction with the R390.
