= Holly Country =

Town in Free State

- Location within Free State (South African province) Location within South Africa
- Coordinates: 26.932°S 27.917°E
- Country: South Africa
- Province: Free State
- District: Fezile Dabi
- Municipality: Metsimaholo

Area
  - Total: 1.39 km^{2} (0.54 sq mi)

Population (2011)
  - Total: 586
  - Density: 422/km^{2} (1,090/sq mi)

Racial makeup (2011)
  - Black African: 21.5%
  - Indian/Asian: 2.2%
  - White: 75.8%
  - Other: 0.5%

First languages (2011)
  - Afrikaans: 64.5%
  - English: 10.5%
  - Sotho: 6.6%
  - Northern Sotho: 3.4%
  - Other: 15.0%
- Time zone: UTC+2 (SAST)
- Postal code (street): 1946

Holly Country, known as the Coalbrook Mining Village until 1996, is a town in Fezile Dabi District Municipality in the Free State province of South Africa.

== History ==
The settlement, located some 5 km from Sasolburg, is a former colliery, and was originally named Coalbrook, probably named after Coalbrookdale in England. It was the scene of the Coalbrook mining disaster on 21 January 1960; 435 workers were buried alive when the mine collapsed.

Richard Hse, a Taiwanese businessman, bought out the old mine village in October 1996, renamed it and turned the place into a hub of factories including clothing, shoes, stoves, wood and paper factories and a sportsfield.
