= Mphorosane =

- Community Council
- Geographic Center of Community
- Coordinates: 29°09′15″S 28°31′57″E
- Country: Lesotho
- District: Leribe District
- Elevation: 7,418 ft (2,261 m)

Population (2006)
  - Total: 9,392
- Time zone: UTC+2 (CAT)
- Coordinates computed from Lesotho Villages file.

Mphorosane is a community council located in the Leribe District of Lesotho. Its population in 2006 was 9,392.

== Villages ==
The community of Mphorosane includes the villages of Cangela, Ha 'Maletairi, Ha 'Mikia (Moreneng), Ha Bereng (Ha Ntseli), Ha Khauta, Ha Leqolana, Ha Manamolela, Ha Manti, Ha Mashapha, Ha Masoetsa (Ha Ntšeli), Ha Mofalali, Ha Molotonyane, Ha Mosiuoa, Ha Motebele (Taung), Ha Nkisi, Ha Nteka, Ha Ntseli (London), Ha Rampoea, Ha Selebeli (Ha Ntšeli), Ha Senyenyane, Ha Sephapho, Ha Taunyane, Ha Teko, Holantu, Kolike, Kutung (Vuka-Mosotho), Laitsoka, Lejoemotho, Lekhalong, Litjokofeng (Ha 'Mikia), Makoabating (Ha Ntšeli), Manganeng, Mohlakeng, Mphorosane, Ntširele, Panteng (Ha 'Mikia), Ramaloso, Sekoting, Thaba-Chitja, Tiping and Topa (Vuka-Mosotho).
