= Sephokong =

- Community Council
- Geographic Center of Community
- Coordinates: 28°48′23″S 28°08′24″E
- Country: Lesotho
- District: Leribe District
- Elevation: 5,295 ft (1,614 m)

Population (2006)
  - Total: 19,199
- Time zone: UTC+2 (CAT)
- Coordinates computed from Lesotho Villages file.

Sephokong is a community council located in the Leribe District of Lesotho. Its population in 2006 was 19,199.

== Villages ==
The community of Sephokong includes the villages of Boribeng, Chafo, Falatsa, Ha 'Mamokoaqo, Ha Au, Ha Au (Nqechane), Ha Bolofo, Ha Isaka, Ha Jakote (Boitelo), Ha Jonathane (Leribe-Moreneng), Ha Josefa (Phatsoe), Ha Kukame (Nqechane), Ha Lapisi (Nqechane), Ha Lehlaha, Ha Lelahla, Ha Letsola-Thebe, Ha Mamokoaqo, Ha Maraisane (Boribeng), Ha Matau (Lithabaneng), Ha Mohapi, Ha Mokhachane, Ha Mokhosi (Papalala), Ha Moshephe, Ha Mosisi, Ha Mosiuoa, Ha Mothetsi, Ha Mothibe, Ha Motseki, Ha Nkhasi (Matsoaing), Ha Phooko, Ha Popa, Ha Pulenyane (Phatsoe), Ha Ralefepo, Ha Ramabanta (Moneseng), Ha Sera, Ha Sera (Ha Mamanyatsa), Ha Setjeo (Pote), Ha Simone, Ha Thinyane, Ha Tlhako, Ha Topia (Nqechane), Ha Topisi, Ha Tota, Ha Tsielala, Levi's Nek, Likoting, Liphakoeng, Litlhokoaneng, Mabuleng, Machoaboleng, Maiseng, Manyakheng, Mohlomong, Mohobollo, Molikaliko (Ha Mothetsi), Mphokong (Ha Jonathane), Phahameng, Phelandaba, Tale, Tlokoeng (Nqechane) and Tsekong.
