= Litjotjela =

- Community Council
- Geographic Center of Community
- Coordinates: 28°56′03″S 28°01′24″E
- Country: Lesotho
- District: Leribe District
- Elevation: 5,620 ft (1,713 m)

Population (2006)
  - Total: 21,383
- Time zone: UTC+2 (CAT)
- Coordinates computed from Lesotho Villages file.

Litjotjela is a community council located in the Leribe District of Lesotho, which is a small country in Southern Africa. Its population in 2006 was 21,383.

== Villages ==
The community of Litjotjela includes the villages of Bothoba-Pelo, Ha Eti (Linotšing), Ha Hoki, Ha Jane (Boinyatso), Ha Lechesa, Ha Lesala, Ha Leshoele, Ha Leshoele (Likhakeng), Ha Lesitsi (Likhakeng), Ha Letuka (Matukeng), Ha Libe, Ha Mahlehle (Likhakeng), Ha Mahlomola (Likhakeng), Ha Malimatle (Matukeng), Ha Masaleng (Ha Mokokoana), Ha Mohlolo (Ha Molupe), Ha Mojapela, Ha Mojela ('Muela), Ha Mokokoana, Ha Morolong ('Muela), Ha Morolong (Likhakeng), Ha Motetepa, Ha Mpopo, Ha Nthako, Ha Ntholi, Ha Nyarela (Tsikoane), Ha Peete, Ha Pitere, Ha Potloane (Tsikoane), Ha Potso (Lipelaneng), Ha Qokolo, Ha Ramoloi (Linotšing), Ha Ranku (Mapheaneng), Ha Sebe, Ha Sekoto, Ha Setenane (Phatlalla), Ha Setho ('Muela), Ha Tšaba-Lira, Ha Tšupane, Hloahloeng, Hloahloeng (Ha Poulo), Lenyakoane, Leqhutsung (Moreneng), Leralleng, Linotsing (Ha Mokokoana), Maebeng, Mahlabatheng, Majakaneng, Mankhololi, Masieeng, Matjelong (Ha Mohale), Matsoapong (Matukeng), Matukeng, Ramosenyehi, Seqhobong, Tsekong and Tsikoane.
