= Numbered routes in Lesotho =

Classification scheme for roads

In Lesotho some roads are designated as numbered routes to help with navigation. There is a nationwide numbering scheme consisting of A, B, C and D routes.

== Numbering ==
In the nationwide numbering scheme, routes are divided into a hierarchy of four categories: A roads, which are the most important routes connecting major cities. B roads, which connecting smaller cities and towns to the national route network, C roads, which connect with B roads and D roads connecting to C roads

- Main Routes: A1 to A99
- Regional Routes: B1 to B99
- Local Routes: C1 to C999
- Minor Routes: D1 to D9999

== Lists of routes ==
- Main roads (Lesotho)
- Regional Routes (Lesotho)
- Local Routes (Lesotho)
- Minor Routes (Lesotho)
