= Hleoheng =

- Community Council
- Geographic Center of Community
- Coordinates: 28°58′24″S 27°55′05″E
- Country: Lesotho
- District: Leribe District
- Elevation: 5,502 ft (1,677 m)

Population (2006)
  - Total: 27,576
- Time zone: UTC+2 (CAT)
- Coordinates computed from Lesotho Villages file.

Hleoheng is a community council located in the Leribe District of Lesotho. Its population in 2006 was 27,576.

== Villages ==
The community of Hleoheng includes the villages of

Ha Akabe
Ha Barete (St Monicas)
Ha Jeremia (St Monicas)
Ha Lekepetsi
Ha Lekepetsi (Likhetlane)
Ha Lepamo
Ha Litsoako (Ha Maqele)
Ha Mafata
Ha Makoanyane
Ha Maqele
Ha Mashapha
Ha Matasane

Ha Matau (St Monicas)
Ha Mathapolane
Ha Matumo
Ha Mokati
Ha Mongali
Ha Mothamahane
Ha Mpotle (Mpharane)
Ha Ntebele (Likhetlane)
Ha Nyenye
Ha Nyenye (Korosong)
Ha Nyenye (Likoting)
Ha Phatsoane

Ha Polaki
Ha Qamo
Ha Ralikuku
Ha Ramoruti
Ha Rapetlonyane
Ha Senei
Ha Sepinare (Likhetlane)
Ha Sethubatha
Ha Taemane
Ha Takalimane (Likhetlane)
Ha Tumo
Hleoheng

Likotjaneng (Hleoheng)
Linoheng (Mpharane)
Lipeleng (Mpharane)
Mafika-Lisiu
Mahabalibaka
Mohalalitoe (Ha Nyenye)
Ntsirele (Hleoheng)
Phukalla (Ha Nyenye)
Qetsolane
Serutle
Tlapaneng
Tšoeneng (Mpharane)
