= Motati =

- Community Council
- Geographic Center of Community
- Coordinates: 28°56′59″S 28°06′15″E
- Country: Lesotho
- District: Leribe District
- Elevation: 5,561 ft (1,695 m)

Population (2006)
  - Total: 10,080
- Time zone: UTC+2 (CAT)
- Coordinates computed from Lesotho Villages file.

Motati is a community council located in the Leribe District of Lesotho. Its population in 2006 was 10,080.

== Villages ==
The community of Motati includes the villages of Ha 'Mako, Ha 'Masamoele, Ha 'Meche (Thaba-Phatsoa), Ha 'Ntšekhe, Ha Kalaele (Matebeleng), Ha Khanyele, Ha Koebelane (Ha Makhoa), Ha Kotsana, Ha Lebona, Ha Lekhanya, Ha Likatana, Ha Maromaki, Ha Masena, Ha Monotsi, Ha Mosebo, Ha Mositi, Ha Motlatsi, Ha Ntoahae, Ha Ntsu, Ha Pontšo, Ha Porobele, Ha Qatsa (Ha Makhoa), Ha Ramotho, Ha Ramotinyane, Ha Rantsane (Thaba-Phatsoa), Ha Tabolane (Ha Makhoa), Ha Tente (Thaba-Phatsoa), Ha Thabo, Ha Tobolela (Thaba-Phatsoa), Ha Tšiu, Ha Tumahole, Jorotane (Thaba-Phatsoa), Letsatseng, Liphokong, Litšukulung (Thaba-Phatsoa), Mafikeng (Ha Makhoa), Makhalong (Thaba-Phatsoa), Moreneng (Ha Makhoa), Sekhokong and Tarabane (Thaba-Phatsoa).
