= Pekka =

Pekka is a Finnish male given name. It was most popular around the middle of the 20th century. As of 2013 there were more than 100,000 people registered with this name in Finland. The nameday is the 29th of June in the Finnish tradition and the 25th of June on the orthodox calendar. It originated as a variation of the name Peter (Pietari).

Notable people with this name include:

- Pekka-Eric Auvinen (1989–2007), perpetrator of the Jokela school shooting in 2007
- Pekka Haavisto (born 1958), Finnish politician and minister
- Pekka Harttila (born 1941), Finnish diplomat and a lawyer
- Pekka Heino (television presenter) (born 1961), Swedish television host and presenter
- Pekka Heino (singer) (born 1976), Finnish metal singer
- Pekka Himanen (born 1973), Finnish philosopher
- Pekka Huhtaniemi (born 1949), Finnish diplomat
- Albert Järvinen (1950–1991), Finnish guitarist
- Pekka Koskela (born 1982), Finnish speed skater
- Pekka Kuusisto (born 1976), Finnish violinist
- Pekka Lagerblom (born 1982), Finnish footballer
- Pekka T. Lehtinen (born 1934), Finnish arachnologist and taxonomist
- Pekka Lehto (born 1948), Finnish film director
- Pekka Leskinen (born 1954), Finnish figure skater
- Pekka Lundmark (born 1963), Finnish business executive
- Pekka Niemi (skier) (1909–1993), Finnish cross-country skier
- Pekka Niemi (weightlifter) (born 1952), Finnish weightlifter
- Pekka Pohjola (1952–2008), Finnish multi-instrumentalist, composer and producer
- Pekka Pyykkö (born 1941), Finnish chemist
- Pekka Rinne (born 1982), Finnish ice hockey goaltender
- Pekka Raudaskoski (1928–2026), Finnish physician
- Pekka Rautakallio (born 1953), Finnish ice hockey defenceman and coach
- Pekka Saarinen (born 1983), Finnish racing driver
- Pekka Salminen (1937–2024), Finnish architect
- Esa-Pekka Salonen (born 1958), Finnish orchestral conductor and composer
- Pekka Sammallahti (born 1947), Finnish professor of Sámi languages
- Pekka Tarjanne (1937–2010), Finnish scientist and politician
- Pekka Vehkonen (born 1964), Finnish former professional motocross racer
- Pekka Vennamo (1944–2026), Finnish politician

== Fictional characters ==
- Pekka Puupää, Finnish comic and film character
- P.E.K.K.A., robotic character in Clash Royale and its spinoff games
- Pekka Rollins, Six of Crows, a duology by Leigh Bardugo

== See also ==
- Ukko-Pekka
