= Viljoensdrif =

- Location within Free State (South African province) Location within South Africa
- Coordinates: 26.73333°S 27.916667°E
- Country: South Africa
- Province: Free State
- District: Fezile Dabi
- Municipality: Metsimaholo

Area
  - Total: 63.30 km^{2} (24.44 sq mi)

Population (2011)
  - Total: 751
  - Density: 11.9/km^{2} (30.7/sq mi)

Racial makeup (2011)
  - Black African: 73.8%
  - Coloured: 1.5%
  - Indian/Asian: 0.7%
  - White: 6.9%
  - Other: 17.2%

First languages (2011)
  - Sotho: 28.5%
  - Zulu: 20.1%
  - Xhosa: 17.4%
  - Afrikaans: 10.2%
  - Other: 23.8%
- Time zone: UTC+2 (SAST)
- Area code: 016

Viljoensdrif is a coal-mining village 8 km south of Vereeniging and part of the Fezile Dabi District Municipality in the Free State province of South Africa.

It takes its name from ford (Afrikaans drif) which was closed to ox-wagons by President Paul Kruger in 1895 to prevent goods reaching the Witwatersrand, thus forcing people to use the Netherlands-South African Railway Company (NZASM)'s Pretoria-Delagoa Bay railroad. Named after the owner of the place, J H Viljoen, who established a ferry in 1857.
