= R713 (South Africa) =

Regional route in South Africa

Regional route R713

Location
- Country: South Africa

Highway system
- Numbered routes of South Africa
| ← R712 | → R714 |

The R713 is a Regional Route in Free State, South Africa.

== Route ==
Its north-western terminus is the R30, 25 km south of Bothaville and 35 km north of Odendaalsrus. It runs east-south-east to end at a junction with the R34, 15 km south-west of Kroonstad and 30 km north-east of Odendaalsrus.
