= Metropolitan routes in Bloemfontein =

Mangaung (Bloemfontein metropolitan area) like most South African metropolitan areas, uses metropolitan or "M" routes for important intra-city routes, a layer below national (N) roads and regional (R) roads. Each city's M roads are independently numbered.

== Table of M roads ==
No.	Direction	Description of route	Suburbs	Street names
M10	East/West / North/South / East/West	M13 (Fauna) - M30 - M12 - M12 - R702 - N8 - M30 / M19 (Noordhoek)	Fauna, Hamilton, Mangaung, Peter Swart, Oos Einde, Noordhoek	Vereeniging Extension Rd., Rudolf Greyling Ave.
M11	East/West / North/South	M30 (Oranjesig) - R700 (cosigned one block) - R700 - R706 - M19 - M14 - N8	Oranjesig, Willows, Universitas, Park West	Rhodes Ave., President Ave., Victoria Rd., Donald Murray Ave., Pres. Paul Kruger Ave., D. F. Malherbe Ave.
M12	North/South	R702 (Heidedal) - M15 - M12 - M10 - doubles back - M10 - M12	Heidedal, various parts of Mangaung	Mkuhlane St., Ramatsoele St., Moshoeshoe St., Chief Moroko Cres., Modimogale St., Makoane St., Zulu St., Dhlabu St.
M13	NE/SW	R702 (Central) - M15 - M30 - M10 - Exits town toward Ferreira, Free State	Central, Oranjesig, Uitsig, Fauna	Hanger St. / Harvey Rd., Harvey Rd., Monument Rd., Memoriam Rd., Ferreira Rd.
M14	East/West, North/South	M11 - under N1 - R64	Universitas, Langenhoven Park	Wynand Mouton St., Totius St., Bankvos Blvd., Du Plessis Ave.
M15	North/South	R700 (Oranjesig) - M30 - M13 - M16 - M12	Oranjesig, Batho, Mangaung	Fort Hare Rd., Tsoai Rd.
M16	NE/SW	N8 - R702 - M15	Ooseinde, Batho	McGregor St.
M19	East/West, North/South, East/West	N1/N8 (Gardenia Park) - M11 - N8 - R700 - M30/M10 (Noordhoek)	Gardenia Park, Wilgehof, Willows, Westdene, Heuwelsig, Hillsboro, Baysvalley, Waverly, Noordhoek	Haldon Rd., Parfitt Ave., Gen. Dan Pienaar St., Deale Rd., Wilcocks Rd.
M30	North/South	N6 (south of Mangaung) - M10 - M13 - R700 - M15 - M11 - N8 - M19 / M10 - N1 (interchange, north of town)	Hamilton, Oranjesig, Central, Hilton, Noordhoek	Church St., St. George St., East Burger St., Andries Pretorius St.

== See also ==
- Numbered routes in South Africa
