= Lebohang Ntsinyi =

Mosotho politician

Lesotho Ambassador to People's Republic of China
- In office 2015–2017
- Appointed by: King Letsie III
- Appointed by: Pakalitha Mosisili

Personal details
- Born: 29 July 1947 (age 78)
- Citizenship: Lesotho
- Party: Lesotho Congress for Democracy
- Occupation: Politician

Lebohang Ntsinyi is the former ambassador of Lesotho to the People's Republic of China.

Ntsinyi is the deputy secretary-general of the Lesotho Congress for Democracy party.

Ntsinyi was Lesotho's Minister of Tourism until 2010.
