= Leribe District =

Coordinates: 29°00′S 28°00′E

Leribe
- District
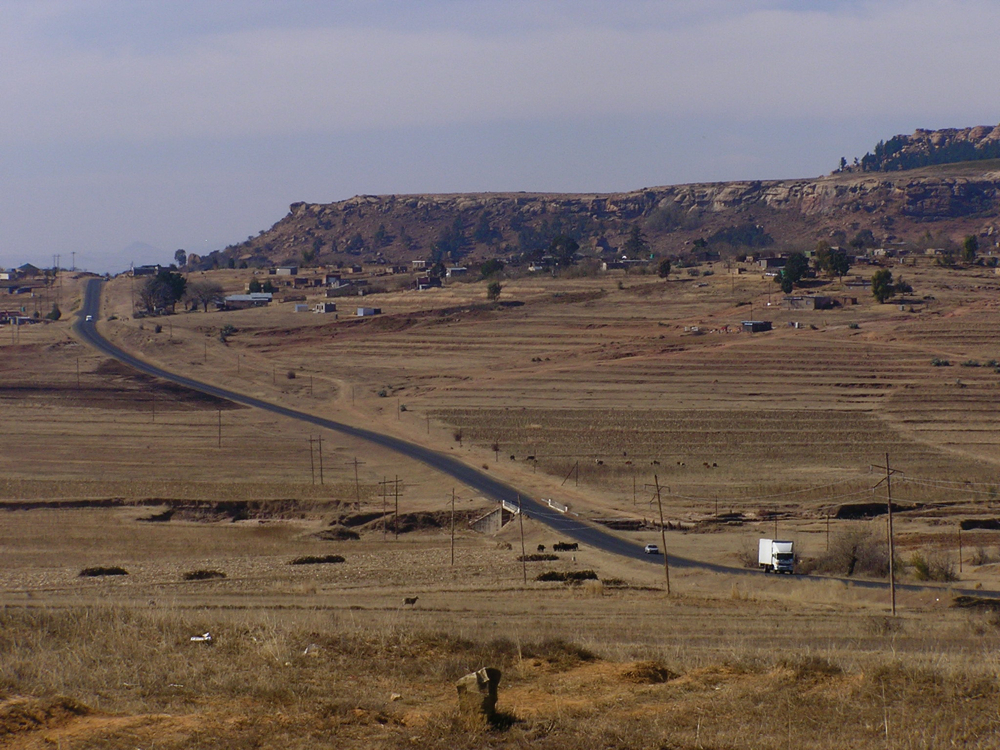
- Nickname: la 'Mamosa le Molapo
- Map of Lesotho with the district highlighted
- Country: Lesotho
- Capital: Hlotse

Area
  - Total: 2,828 km^{2} (1,092 sq mi)

Population (2016)
  - Total: 337,521
  - Density: 119.3/km^{2} (309.1/sq mi)
- Time zone: UTC+2 (CAT)
- Area code: +266
- HDI (2019): 0.527 low · 4th

Leribè is a district of Lesotho. It has an area of 2,828 km^{2} and a population in 2016 of approximately 337,500. Hlotse is the capital or camptown of the district. The district has one additional town, namely Maputsoe. In the west, Leribe borders on the Free State Province of South Africa. Domestically, it borders Butha-Buthe District in the north, Mokhotlong District in the east, Thaba-Tseka District in southeast and Berea District in southwest.

As of 2006, the district had a population of 293,369 which was 15.63 per cent of the total population of the country. As of 2008, 48% of the population in the district were economically active. There were 191,052 employed people out of a total of 401,258 people in the district above 15 years of age.

== Demographics ==
As of 2006, the district had a population of 293,369, 15.63 per cent of the population of the country. The area of the district is 2,828 km^{2}, 9.32% of the total area of the country. The population density in the district was 104 persons per square kilometre, compared to 62 for the country. There were thirteen constituencies and eighteen community councils in the district. As of 2006, 704 people tested HIV positive, 29.70% of the HIV-positive persons in the country. 270 of these (28.3%) were men; 433 (30.6%) were women.

== Geography ==
In the west, Leribe borders on the Free State Province of South Africa. Domestically, it borders on the following districts: Butha-Buthe District in the north, Mokhotlong District in the east, Thaba-Tseka District in southeast and Berea District in southwest. The Western districts of Lesotho has a predominantly low land zone with an elevation of 1,500 m (4,900 ft) to 1,800 m (5,900 ft) above the sea level. These lands are the major agricultural zones in the country. The average annual rainfall in the country is 100 cm (39 in), most of which is received during the rainy season of October to April. Though it rains during all the months of the year, groundwater is limited on account of run-offs. The region has a temperate climate on account of the elevation and is humid during most parts of the year. The temperature in the low lands vary from 32 °C (90 °F) to −7 °C (19 °F) in the winter.

Climate data for Leribe District
Month	Jan	Feb	Mar	Apr	May	Jun	Jul	Aug	Sep	Oct	Nov	Dec	Year
Mean daily maximum °C (°F)	26 (79)	27 (81)	24 (75)	21 (70)	19 (66)	16 (61)	16 (61)	20 (68)	23 (73)	27 (81)	26 (79)	28 (82)	23 (73)
Mean daily minimum °C (°F)	15 (59)	14 (57)	12 (54)	6 (43)	5 (41)	1 (34)	−1 (30)	0 (32)	4 (39)	10 (50)	12 (54)	14 (57)	8 (46)
Average rainfall mm (inches)	130 (5.1)	65 (2.6)	64 (2.5)	24 (0.9)	43 (1.7)	39 (1.5)	0 (0)	0 (0)	9 (0.4)	16 (0.6)	105 (4.1)	86 (3.4)	582 (22.9)
Source 1:
Source 2:

== Economy ==
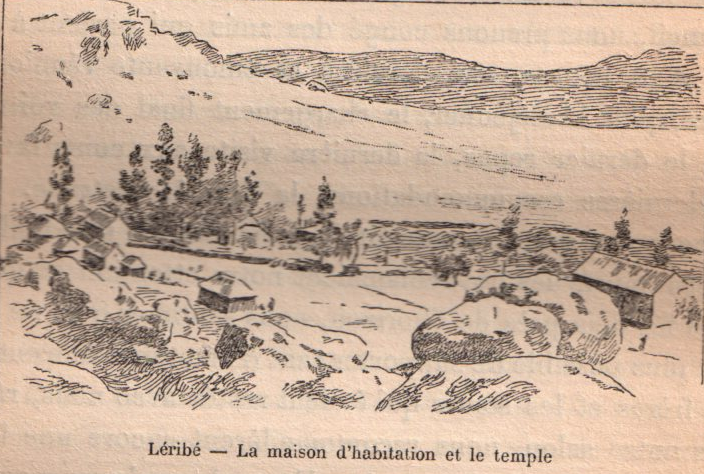
A historical settlement in the district

As of 2008, there were 48 per cent economically active people in the district. There were totally 191,052 employed people out of a total of 401,258 people in the district above 15 years of age. The employed population in the age group of 6–14 years was 4,658 out of a total of 114,078 people in the district in the age group. The labour force participation stood at 189.30. The number of people involved in subsistence agriculture is 3,676 and the number of people in other sectors was 982. The number of unemployed people in the district was 61,046 and the unemployment rate was 073. The total area planted in 2009 was 27,059 which formed 6.70 per cent of the total area planted in the country. The total production was 12,006 tonnes, which was 7.97 per cent of the totals in the country. The major crop was maize, while wheat, sorghum, beans and peas were the other crops planted. The total production of maize was 9,540 tonnes, beans was 503 tonnes, sorghum was 065 tonnes, peas was 1,368 tonnes and wheat was 530 tonnes as of 2008. As of 2007, there were a total of 351 km (218 mi) of paved roads in the district, with 273 km (170 mi) paved roads and 78 km (48 mi) of unpaved roads.

== Administration ==
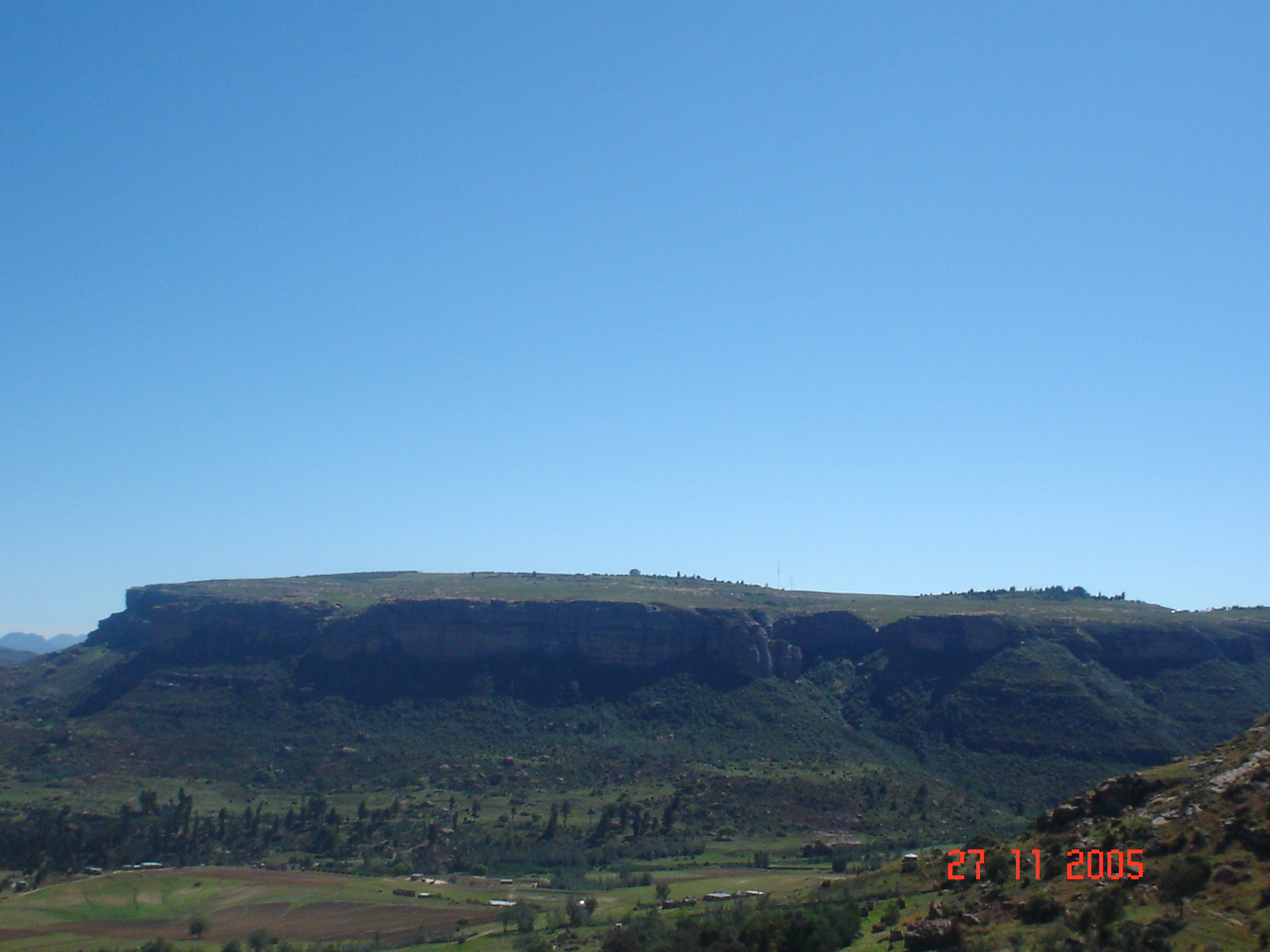
A part of the Leribe Plateau

Constituencies of Leribe District are Hlotse, Kolonyama, Leribe, Mahobong Maliba-Matšo, Maputsoe, Matlakeng, Moselinyane, Mphosong, Peka, Pela-Tšoeu, Thaba-Phatšoa and Tsikoane. Community councils of Leribe District are Fenyane, Hleoheng, Khomokhoana, Limamarela, Linare, Litjotjela, Maisa-Phoka, Malaoaneng, Manka, Matlameng, Menkhoaneng, Motati, Mphorosane, Pitseng, Sephokong, Serupane, Seshote and Tsoilitsoili. As per the 1968 Local Government Repeal Act - Development Committees Order No.9 of 1986, a District Development Committee (DDC) should have a set of Ward Development Committees (WDC) for each ward and Village Development Committees (VDC) under it. Each VDC has a set of seven elected members and the head would be an ex-officio member and chairman of the committee. The WDC is composed of twelve members elected from about VDCs, whose chairman would be and ex-officio member. The fifteen-membered DDC is elected by the members of WDC. When there are cases of more than one DDC, the chiefs would alternate in meetings. The district secretary co-ordinates the activities of the various committees. As per the Local Government Amendment Act 2004, the District Development Coordination Committee was established as the supreme body of district administration, under which all the district councils were branched. The urban and municipal councils were under each district council, which in turn had community councils under it. The Independent Electoral Commission (IEC) is responsible for the administration of the Local Government Elections. The nation's first local government elections were conducted in April 2005, while the most recent elections were held in October 2011. During these elections, 64 community councils, 11 urban councils and one municipal council were elected.
