= Maputsoe =

Coordinates: 28.895°S 27.907°E

Maputsoe, Leribe
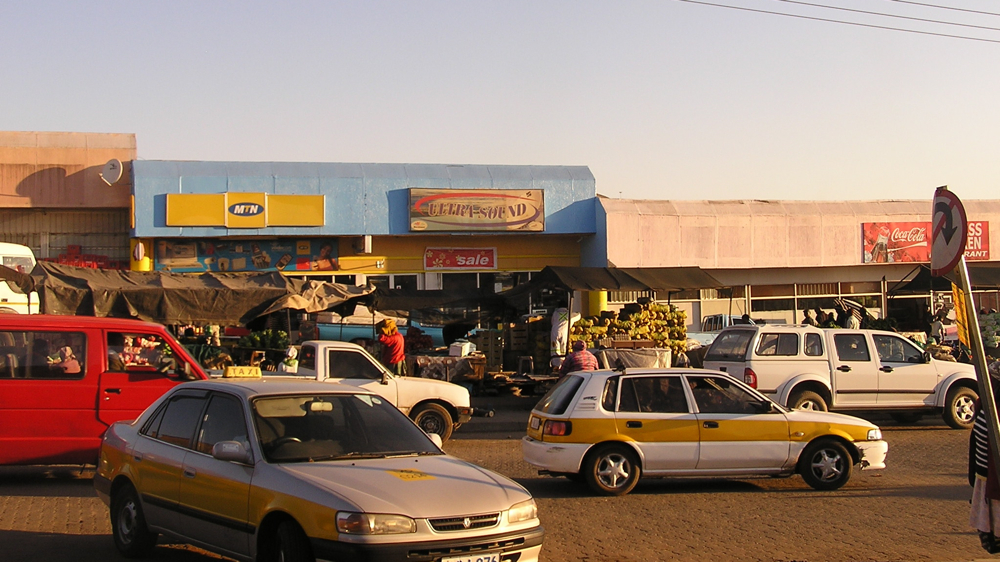
- Open air market in central Maputsoe.

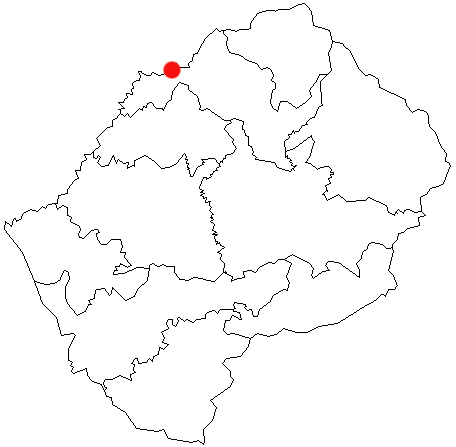
- Location of Maputsoe in Lesotho.

Maputsoe is a town and constituency located in the northern district of Leribe in Lesotho; it shares a border-post with Ficksburg in the Free State province of South Africa, with the Mohokare River forming the national boundary. It has a population of 55,541.

The Irish NGO 'Action Lesotho', which works in Maputsoe, was set up by politician Mannete Ramali, whilst she was Ambassador to Ireland.

== Villages ==
Maputsoe includes the villages of Mathata, Ha Nyenye (Ha Maputsoe, Khomo-lia-oela, Ha Chonapase, Phukalla, Mohalalitoe and Ha Maqele), Ha Motlalehi and Ha Chaka.
