= Dewetsdorp =

- Location within Free State (South African province) Location within South Africa
- Coordinates: 29°35′S 26°40′E
- Country: South Africa
- Province: Free State
- Municipality: Mangaung
- Established: 1880

Government
  - Type: Municipality
  - Mayor: Mpolokeng Mahase (ANC)

Area
  - Total: 23.05 km^{2} (8.90 sq mi)

Population (2011)
  - Total: 833
  - Density: 36.1/km^{2} (93.6/sq mi)

Racial makeup (2011)
  - White: 70.14%
  - Black African: 26.74%
  - Coloured: 1.8%
  - Indian/Asian: 1.08%
  - Other: 0.24%

First languages (2011)
  - Afrikaans: 70.31%
  - Sotho: 20.43%
  - English: 3.13%
  - Tswana: 2.4%
  - Other: 3.73%
- Time zone: UTC+2 (SAST)
- Postal code (street): 9940
- PO box: 9940
- Area code: 051

Dewetsdorp is a small town in the Free State province of South Africa, 68 km south-east of Bloemfontein. The town was set up, without approval of the Volksraad, by field-cornet Jacobus de Wet, father of the Second Anglo-Boer War general Christiaan de Wet. Eventually recognized officially, the town became a municipality and named De Wet in 1890. General Christiaan de Wet successfully attacked English forces stationed there in November 1900.

It was laid out on the farm Kareefontein in 1876 and at first bore this name. Applications to the Volksraad in 1876 for the establishment of a village failed, but another request in 1879 led to recognition in 1880 under the name Dewetsdorp. Municipal status was attained in 1890. Dewetsdorp was the scene of heavy fighting in the Second Anglo-Boer War. In 1927, three officials died when the town hall was blown up by one Huibrecht Jacob de Leeuw in an attempt to cover up evidence of his embezzlement of town funds. The new Town Hall, built in 1928, was declared a South African Heritage Site in 1995.
