= Van Rooyen's Gate =

South African border post

Van Rooyen's Gate is a Border Post located between South Africa and Lesotho, currently in Lesotho.

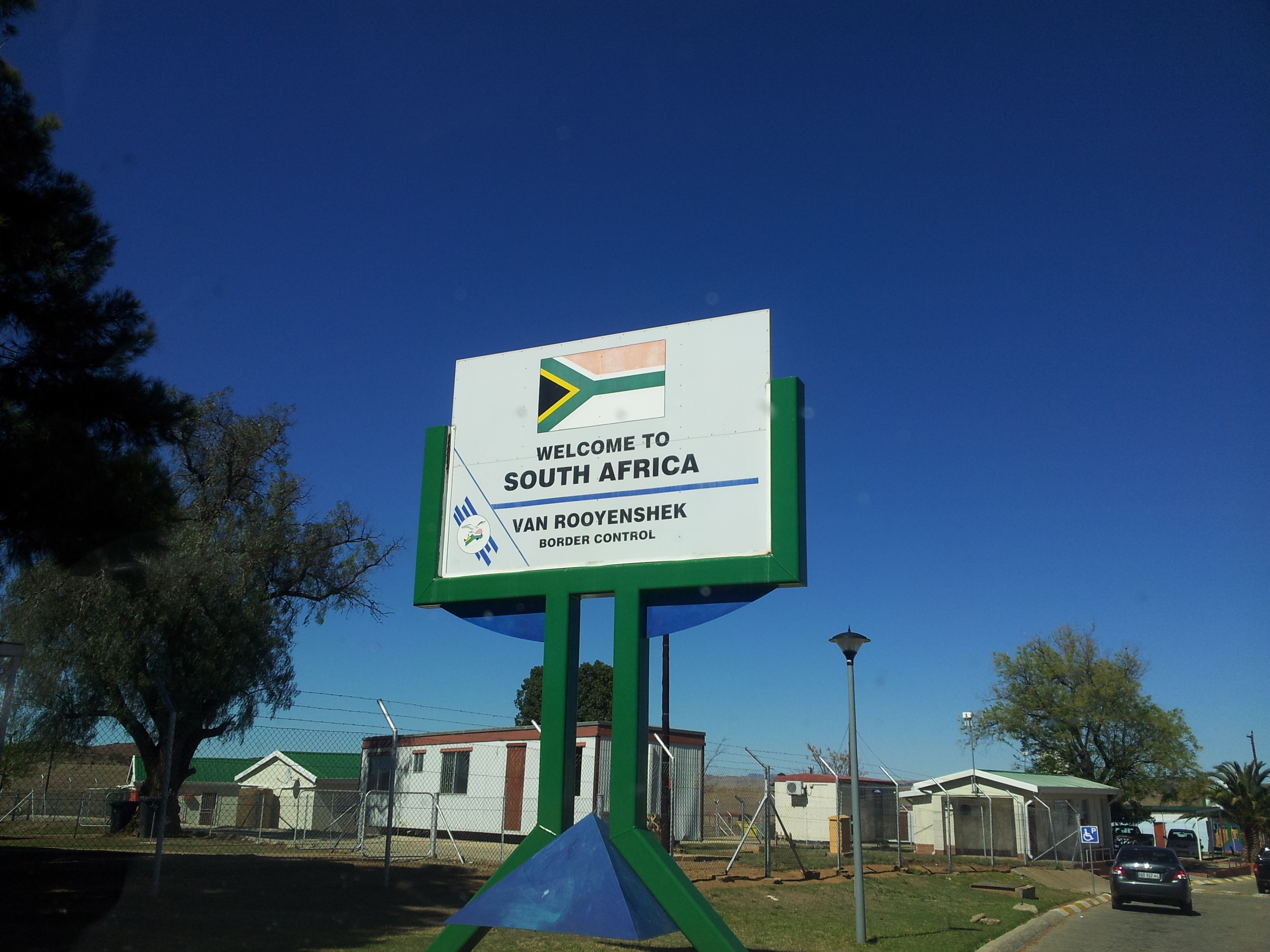
Border Post on the South African side

	South Africa	Lesotho
Region	Free State	Mafeteng
City	Wepener	Mafeteng
Road	R702	A20
GPS Coordinates	29.7563°S 27.10834°E	29.7559°S 27.1092°E
Telephone number	+27 (0) 51 583 1525	
Fax number	+27 (0) 51 583 1530	
Postal address	P O Box 100 Wepener 9944	
Business hours Travellers	06:00 - 22:00	
Business hours General	07:30 - 16:15	
