= Deneysville =

- Location within Free State (South African province) Location within South Africa
- Coordinates: 26°53′42″S 28°5′54″E
- Country: South Africa
- Province: Free State
- District: Fezile Dabi
- Municipality: Metsimaholo

Area
  - Total: 45.9 km^{2} (17.7 sq mi)

Population (2011)
  - Total: 19,479
  - Density: 424/km^{2} (1,100/sq mi)

Racial makeup (2011)
  - Black African: 38%
  - Coloured: 0.5%
  - Indian/Asian: 0.1%
  - White: 59%
  - Other: 0.3%

First languages (2011)
  - Sotho: 76.4%
  - Zulu: 6.8%
  - Afrikaans: 5.3%
  - Xhosa: 4.6%
  - Other: 6.8%
- Time zone: UTC+2 (SAST)
- Postal code (street): 1932
- PO box: 1932
- Area code: (016) 371

Deneysville is a small town on the banks of the Vaal Dam in the Free State province of South Africa.

== History ==
Deneysville was established in 1936 and named after Deneys Reitz, writer of Commando: A Boer Journal of the Boer War and son of former Orange Free State president Francis William Reitz. The dam has two names, Lake Deneys and Vaal Dam, with the latter being the official and most commonly used name. The town "Deneysville" however, established on the shores of the dam was named after him. The stone cottage on the waterfront which was originally built as a hunting lodge by the Reitz family, is now St. Peter's Church, and has become a popular wedding venue. The original village management board became a municipality and today falls under the large area council of Metsimaholo. The town was slow in developing until the turn of the century when it was rediscovered and is today a fast developing recreational center with many new holiday homes adding to permanent working and retired population.

The waterfront along Waverley Road was declared a tourism node by Fezile Dabi district municipality in 2013 and is the start of the 'Lion Route'.

In early stone-age times, the Tswana-Sotho had settled along the shore of the Vaal River, where Deneysville is established today. The Makgolokwe-a-Mafehleng (Bakgatla from Tabane) lived in the area from around 1836. The ruins of their stone dwellings can be seen in the area today opposite the Municipal buildings. There is an interesting exhibition of artifacts in the town's library which is situated behind the Municipal offices. It was inaccurately said the ruins were from the Khoisan, but the archaeological study proved that it was the Tswana-Sotho branch of Kwena and Fokeng and not the Khoisan that lived in the area.

Many of these artifacts were saved prior to the flooding of the valley and originate from the farm, Zandfontein, which is now an island in the middle of North Bay called Groot Eiland (or UJ Island, as the University of Jhb. has a 99-year lease over it).

== Vaal Dam ==
Deneysville, situated on the Free State side of the Vaal River, is the largest town on the Vaal Dam banks. There are four yacht clubs that hold regular sailing races at weekends. Two of the most known races are Keel Boat Week held at Deneysville Aquatic Club and Round The Island Yacht Race which is held at Lake Deneys Yacht Club.

National Sea Rescue Institute Station 22 is located at Manten Marina in Deneysville.
