= Pontso Sekatle =

Mosotho politician

Dr. Pontso Sekatle

Minister of Local government and Chieftainship Affairs
- In office 2012–2015
- Constituency: Qacha's Nek constituency

Personal details
- Born: 27 May 1957 (age 69)
- Party: Lesotho Congress for Democracy (1997–2012); Democratic Congress (2012–2018); All Basotho Convention (2018–present)

Pontso S. M. Sekatle (born 26 May 1957) is a politician and academic in Lesotho. Sekatle lectured at the National University of Lesotho from 1984 to 2001. In June 2001, she was appointed to the Senate of Lesotho, and on July 6, 2001 she became Minister of Health and Social Welfare. She was a member of the Qacha's Nek constituency for third time with the win in the elections in 2012 and was appointed the Minister of Local government and Chieftainship Affairs.

Dr. Sekatle in her capacity as the Minister of Local government, executed the local elections in 2005, the first of its kind in Lesotho and originally envisioned during 1968.

== Early life ==
Sekatle was born on 26 May 1957 in Quthing District of Lesotho. She completed her primary education at Quthing Primary, secondary at Mopeli Secondary School and her Cambridge School Certificate in Masitise High School. Sekalte started her career as a lecturer of National University of Lesotho and went on to become the Head of the Department of Political and Administrative Studies. In June 2001, she was appointed as a member of the Upper House of the Representatives. Her husband, Semano Sekatle, is also a member of the government, currently serving as Minister of Public Service.

== Political career ==
In the May 2002 parliamentary election, which was her first election, she stood as the ruling Lesotho Congress for Democracy (LCD) candidate in the Qacha's Nek constituency, previously held by Prime Minister Pakalitha Mosisili (who contested the Tsoelike constituency instead), and won 72.4% of the vote. Following the election, in June 2002, she was moved from her position as Minister of Health to that of Minister of Local Government. Following the February 2007 parliamentary election, she remained in the latter position in the government of March 2007. She was a member of the Qacha's Nek constituency for third time with the win in the elections in 2012 and was appointed the Minister of Local government and Chieftainship Affairs. Sekatle joined the new Pakalitha Mosisili-led splinter party Democratic Congress on its formation in 2012. In December 2018, Semano Sekatle, Pontso's husband and fellow Democratic Congress legislator, defected to Tom Thabane's ruling All Basotho Convention. Pontso soon after quit her post as Democratic Congress's Women League president. Speculation that Pontso would too soon follow suit and defect to the All Basotho Convention was put to rest in April 2019, when she was officially presented to ABC masses at one of Thabane's rallies in Peka, Leribe, as one of the All Basotho Convention's latest catches.

== Positions held ==
Dr. Sekatle was appointed as the Minister of Local government with an aim of realizing the decentralization drive of the Lesotho government envisioned during 1968. She is considered to have driven the local elections in 2005, the first of its kind in Lesotho. Dr. Sekatle has also headed various executive committees like Lesoth Congress for Democracy Women's League (DCWL) and Democratic Congress League (DCL). She started as a Secretary General in 2008 and went on to become the President of both the committees, which she headed as of 2016. She was also the Deputy President for African Association for Public Administration and Management (AAPAM), Deputy President for Commonwealth Local Government Forum (CWLG), Director of UNESCO Lesotho and Director of Lesotho National Development Corporation (LNDC). She has published various works in the field of public administration, governance and institution building.
