= Maphoka Motoboli =

Mosotho politician

Member of the National Assembly of Lesotho

Deputy Minister of Education and Training

Personal details
- Occupation: Politician

Maphoka Motoboli is a Lesotho politician.

Motoboli is a member of the National Assembly of Lesotho, the lower house of the Parliament of Lesotho.

Motoboli was the Deputy Minister of Education.

== See also ==
- Politics of Lesotho
