= Mphu Ramatlapeng =

Lesotho politician, businesswoman and non-profit executive

- Born: c. 1953; Lesotho
- Education: Johns Hopkins University; Kharkiv National Medical University
- Occupations: politician, businesswoman and non-profit executive
- Employer: Clinton Foundation

Mphu Ramatlapeng (born c. 1953) is a Lesotho politician, businesswoman and non-profit executive.

== Early life ==
Mphu Ramatlapeng was born circa 1953 in Lesotho. She earned a medical degree from the Kharkiv National Medical University, followed by a master's degree in public health from Johns Hopkins University.

== Career ==
Ramatlapeng was Minister of Health and Social Welfare of Lesotho from 2007 to 2012.

Ramatlapeng was vice chair of The Global Fund to Fight AIDS, Tuberculosis and Malaria until 2013. She is executive vice president at the Clinton Health Access Initiative of the Clinton Foundation.

Ramatlapeng serves as a non-executive director of Anglo American plc.
