= Peka (Lesotho) =

Peka Bheka Malihotetso
- Nickname: Masaleng
- Location in Lesotho
- Coordinates: 28°58′S 27°46′E
- Country: Lesotho
- District: Leribe District
- Constituency: Peka

Government
- Elevation: 5,280 ft (1,610 m)

Population (2005)
  - Total: 17,161
- Time zone: UTC+2 (SAST)
- Climate: Cwb

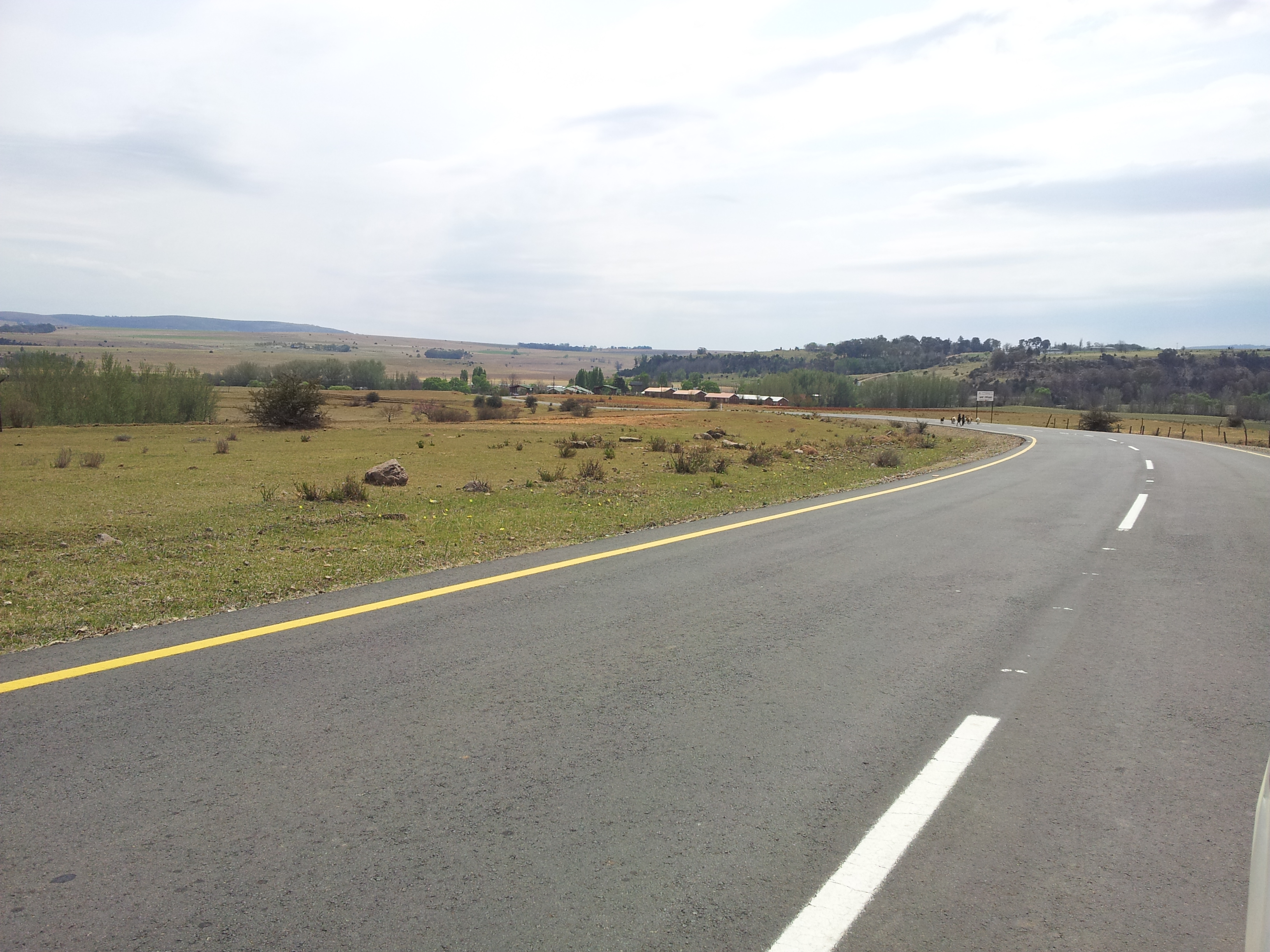
Road on the Lesotho side of Peka Bridge.

Peka is a town in the Leribe District of Lesotho. It has a population of approximately 17,161 (2005).
