= Wepener =

Town near Lesotho in Free State, SA

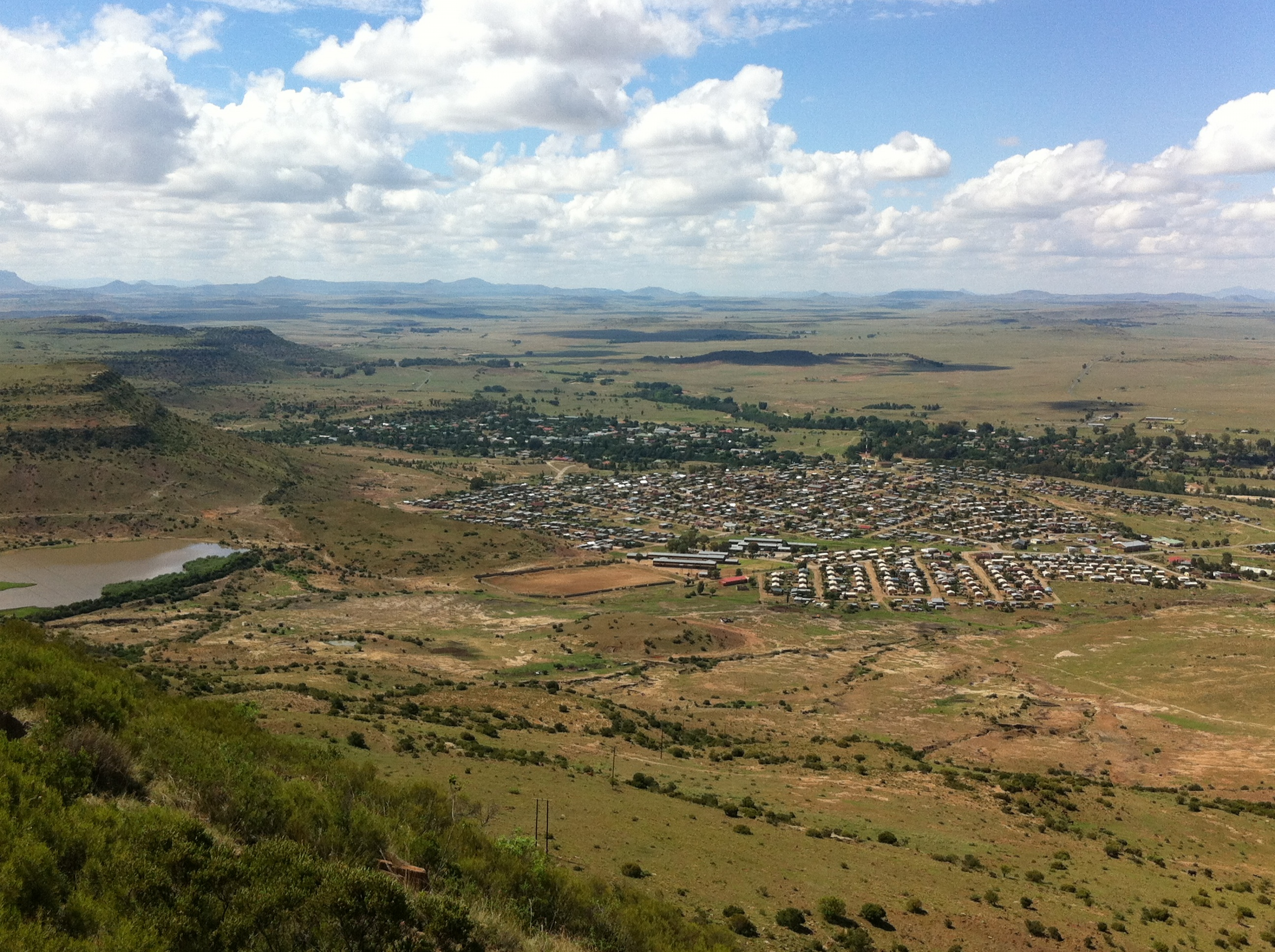
- Wepener

- Location within Free State (South African province) Location within South Africa Location within Africa
- Coordinates: 29°44′S 27°02′E
- Country: South Africa
- Province: Free State
- Municipality: Mangaung
- Established: 1875
  - Mayor: (ANC)

Area
  - Total: 38.6 km^{2} (14.9 sq mi)

Population (2011)
  - Total: 9,553
  - Density: 247/km^{2} (641/sq mi)

Racial makeup (2011)
  - Black African: 94.0%
  - Coloured: 3.1%
  - Indian/Asian: 0.9%
  - White: 1.8%
  - Other: 0.2%

First languages (2011)
  - Sotho: 84.6%
  - Afrikaans: 7.0%
  - English: 3.0%
  - Xhosa: 2.6%
  - Other: 2.8%
- Time zone: UTC+2 (SAST)
- Postal code (street): 9944
- PO box: 9944
- Area code: 051

Wepener is a town in the Free State, South Africa, located near the border of Lesotho.

== History ==
The town is named after Louw Wepener, the leader of the Boers in their war with the Basotho chief Moshoeshoe I in 1865. It was founded in 1867 on the banks of Jammersbergspruit, a tributary of the Caledon River. The Jammerberg (Mountain of Sorrow) towers over the village. Louw Wepener was killed on 15 August 1865 while trying to storm Moshoeshoe's stronghold of Thaba Bosiu. One of the local schools is also named after him.

Wepener was the southernmost of several settlements founded by the Free Staters in the "conquered territories" to prevent the Basotho from resettling the land taken from them during the war of 1865. The Dutch Reformed parish was established in 1870 and the town was granted its first management board in 1875. The beautiful sandstone Dutch Reformed church was designed by a Welsh architect. The design of the church reflected his heritage – the Prince of Wales's feathers adorn the steeple.

During the Anglo-Boer War, a British and South African colonial garrison of 2,000 men under Colonel Edmund Dalgety was besieged by the Boer commandos under the command of General Christiaan de Wet at Jammers drift on the Caledon River. The siege lasted 17 days, until reinforcements arrived on 25 April 1900 to end the battle in favour of the British.

The district of Wepener was the scene of many battles, raids and skirmishes during the 19th century. Many graves, mostly without identification, still exist as reminders of the events in the valley of Jammerbergspruit during this stormy period.

== Present ==
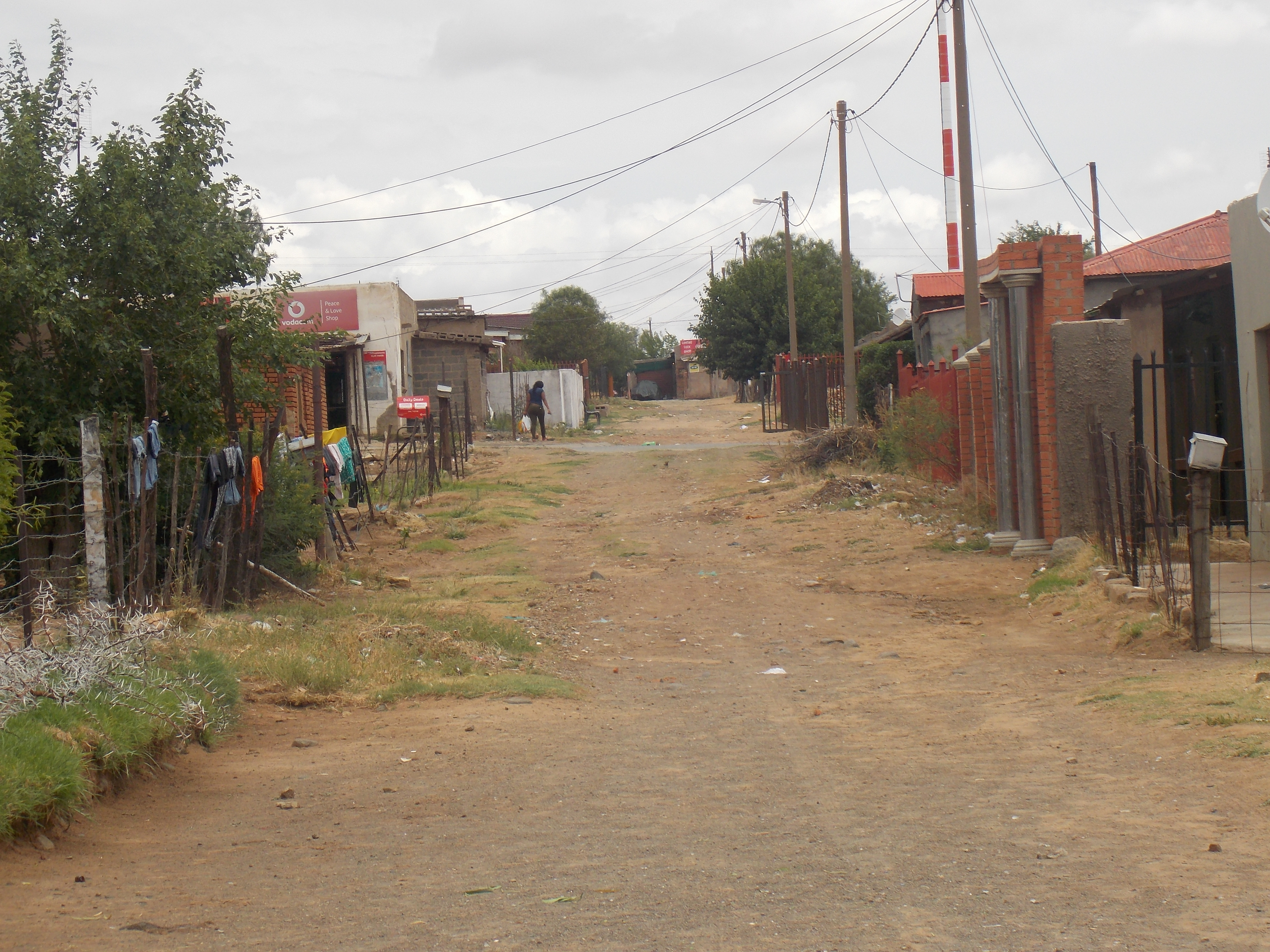
Street in Wepener township

Today the town is a commercial center for a 1,725 km^{2} district where mixed farming is practised. Farming activities include cattle and sheep ranching, dairy farming and the cultivation of wheat and maize.

There is one hotel in Wepener, the Lord Fraser's Guest House. Lord Fraser's was the summer residence of Lord Ian Fraser of Lonsdale. He was the chairman of the board of the once powerful retail business, Frasers, in Lesotho. The Fleetwood Country Inn is situated about 5 miles outside the town. There are leisure facilities at the nearby Knelpoort and Welbedacht dams.
