= Trompsburg =

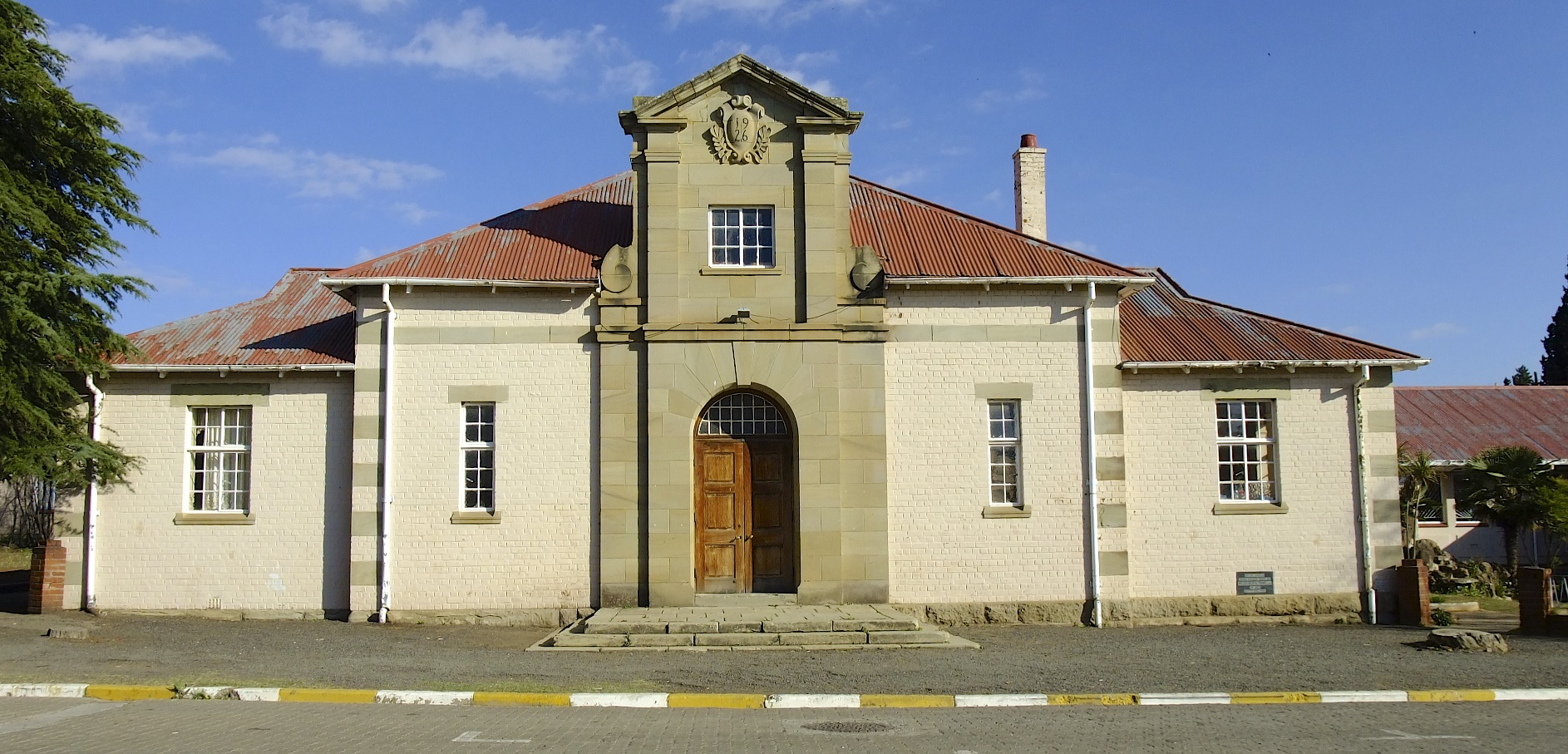
- Trompsburg town hall

- Location within Free State (South African province) Location within South Africa
- Coordinates: 30°1′S 25°46′E
- Country: South Africa
- Province: Free State
- District: Xhariep
- Municipality: Kopanong

Government
  - Type: Municipality
  - Mayor: Xolani Tseletsele (ANC)

Area
  - Total: 16.2 km^{2} (6.3 sq mi)

Population (2011)
  - Total: 5,338
  - Density: 330/km^{2} (853/sq mi)

Racial makeup (2011)
  - Black African: 70.2%
  - Coloured: 22.1%
  - Indian/Asian: 0.5%
  - White: 6.6%
  - Other: 0.6%

First languages (2011)
  - Sotho: 41.3%
  - Afrikaans: 35.7%
  - Xhosa: 15.7%
  - English: 1.8%
  - Other: 5.5%
- Time zone: UTC+2 (SAST)
- Postal code (street): 9913
- PO box: 9913
- Area code: 051

Trompsburg is a small town in the Free State province of South Africa off the N1 highway, the major road connection between Johannesburg and Cape Town.

It serves as the administrative seat of the Kopanong Local Municipality within the Xhariep District. With a population of around 6000 residents in the town and associated townships of Noordmanville and Madikgetla, it is a rural center focused on farming, particularly sheep, cattle, and grain production.

The outskirts of the town are adjacent to a tributary feeding into the Van Zyl Spruit. This is a typical seasonal watercourse in the semi-arid region of the southern Free State. It forms part of the local drainage system that ultimately feeds into larger basins like the Orange River.

== History ==
The farm Middelwater, on which Trompsburg would later be established, was owned in the mid-19th century by brothers Jan and Bastiaan Tromp.

The town was formally laid out on portions of the farm in 1891 and named Jagersfontein Road since it served as a railway stop linking it to the nearby the Jagersfontein Mine. This stop was vital for transporting diamonds, goods, and passengers between Jagersfontein and other major Free State towns. The railway station attracted traders, merchants and farmers, gradually forming the foundation of what would become a permanent settlement. The town's development accelerated as the railway was linked to broader rail networks and positioning it as a key stopover on the Johannesburg-Cape Town route.

During the Second Boer War, the strategic location of the town made it a rest and supply point for British forces as they moved through the Orange Free State.

The town was briefly renamed to Hamilton, honoring Sir Hamilton John Goold-Adams, Lieutenant-Governor of the Orange River Colony from 1901 to 1910.

It was renamed Trompsburg in 1902 in honor of the Tromp family, coinciding with the granting of municipal status and broader reconstruction efforts after the war.

A school opened as early as 1893 with about 50 students. The Dutch Reformed Church heavily influenced it, using the building for church services and public gatherings. The early 1900s saw the building of the local Dutch Reformed Church and its associated buildings. In the 1920s, efforts focused on establishing a school hostel, reflecting growing educational needs. The town hall was inaugurated in 1926.

By the mid-20th century, Trompsburg had become a major center for Merino sheep farming, renowned for wool production and hosting one of South Africa's largest shearing barns. The town's economy diversified with grain and cattle farming. Trompsburg mirrored broader Free State patterns of segregation and labor migration during the Apartheid era.

The town received its electricity supply in 1960. This was part of a broader rollout by the Electricity Supply Commission (ESCOM, now Eskom) to electrify towns in the Southern Orange Free State, including Trompsburg and the nearby towns of Reddersburg, Bethulie, Edenburg, Philippolis and Springfontein. Prior to this, electricity was limited or absent in non-urban, agricultural areas, with national electrification efforts initially prioritizing mining centers and larger cities from the 1880s onward.

A tornado struck Trompsburg on November 5, 1976. This remains one of the longest recorded tornado paths in South African history. It started near Hanover, tracking some 175 km through rural/farmland areas. It reached Trompsburg, with a F3 rating on the Fujita scale, with wind speeds estimated at 250–330 km/h. Along with some injuries and damages to properties in the town, 5 fatalities were reported in rural areas. The damage was relatively limited because much of the path went through open farmland rather than densely populated zones.

Post 1994, integration into democratic South Africa emphasized community development, with the Kopanong Municipality formed in 2000 through the amalgamation of nine towns to manage local services. This restructuring emphasized equitable development, including RDP housing programs that provided thousands of homes to previously disadvantaged residents since 1994. The Albert Nzula District Hospital serves as a key public health resource in the region, offering general wards, emergency services, dispensary, and specialized care to the underserved Xhariep community.

In early 1996 the town was the site of racial tensions and incidents related to school desegregation efforts following the end of apartheid. The events centered on attempts by black parents and students to enroll in the local white-dominated Trompsburg Secondary School. Reports from February 1996 describe hundreds of black parents marching to demand access for their children to the school. On February 20, 1996, a group of white men attacked approximately 300 black students who were protesting outside the school after it refused to enroll them. Police reportedly stood by and watched during the incident.

== Coat of Arms (pre-2000) ==
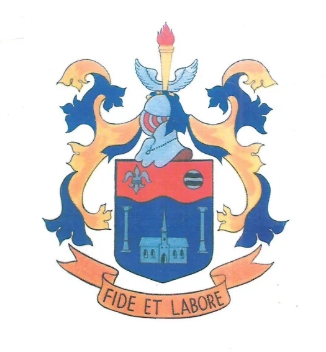
Trompsburg Coat of Arms (pre-2000)

The coat of arms is from the era when Trompsburg was an independent municipality.

The shield prominently displays the local Dutch Reformed Church. The motto Fide et Labore translates to Faith and Labour.

In 2000, as part of post-apartheid local government reforms, Trompsburg was incorporated into the larger Kopanong Local Municipality (along with several other towns like Fauresmith, Jagersfontein, and Philippolis).

The current Kopanong Municipality does not have an official registered coat of arms in the traditional sense; its public branding focuses on modern municipal logos rather than heraldic designs.

== Notable residents ==
Karel Schoeman, a novelist and historian

Brothers C. M. van den Heever (novelist and poet) and Kootjie van den Heever (author)

Ben-Piet van Zyl South African international rugby union player

Arthur Goldstuck, an author, journalist and commentator on ICT, internet and mobile technologies

== Educational institutions ==
- Trompsburg Secondary School
- Trompsburg Primary School
- PT Sander Combined School
- Madikgetla Primary School
