= Fauresmith =

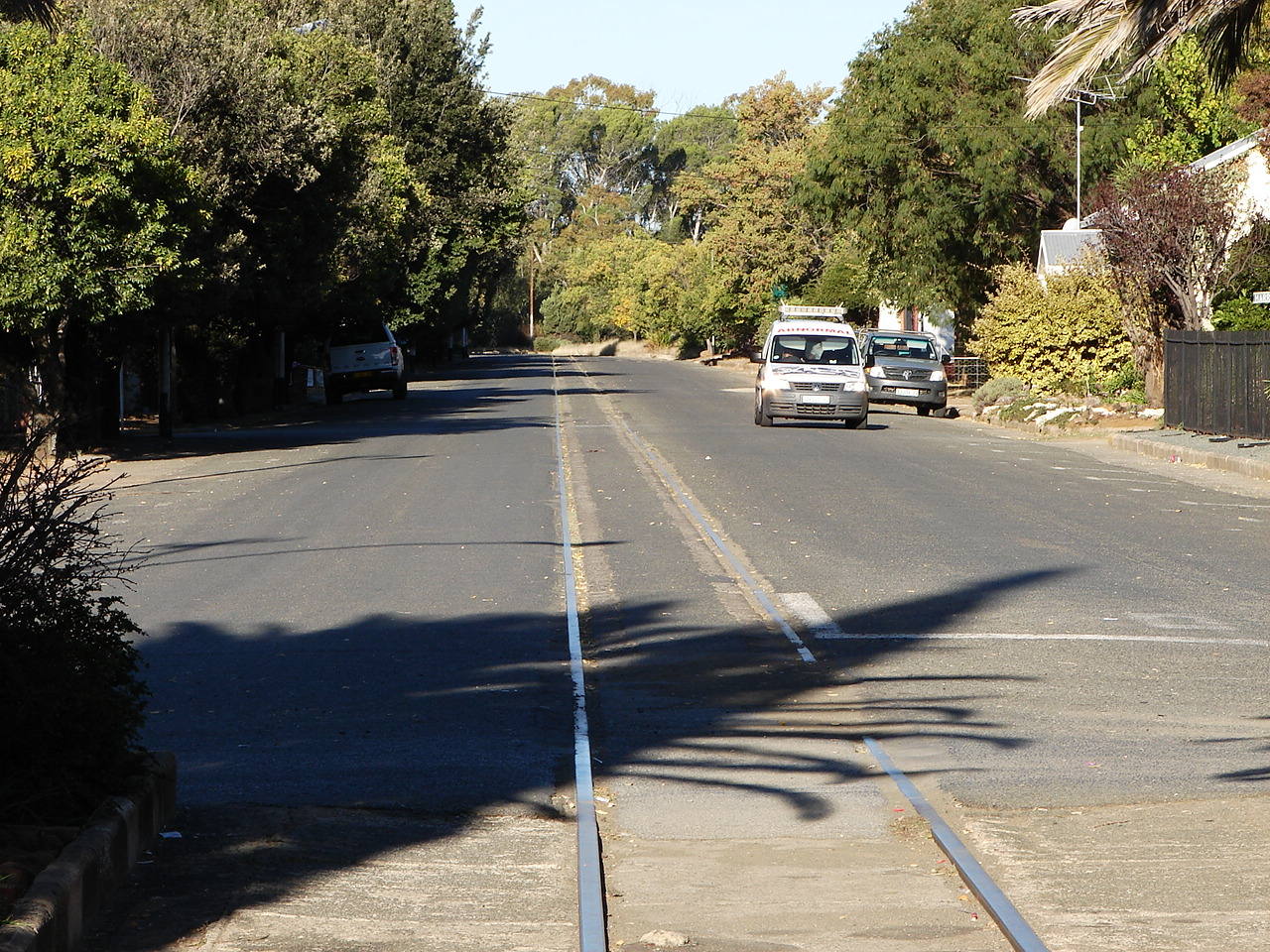
- Fauresmith main street with the railway line along the centre

- Location within Free State (South African province) Location within South Africa Location within Africa
- Coordinates: 29°45′S 25°19′E
- Country: South Africa
- Province: Free State
- District: Xhariep
- Municipality: Kopanong
- Established: 1849

Government
  - Type: Municipality
  - Mayor: Xolile Mathwa (ANC)

Area
  - Total: 53.2 km^{2} (20.5 sq mi)

Population (2011)
  - Total: 3,628
  - Density: 68.2/km^{2} (177/sq mi)

Racial makeup (2011)
  - Black African: 68.6%
  - Coloured: 22.8%
  - Indian/Asian: 0.5%
  - White: 7.8%
  - Other: 0.4%

First languages (2011)
  - Afrikaans: 61.2%
  - Sotho: 15.5%
  - Xhosa: 14.1%
  - Tswana: 6.5%
  - Other: 2.7%
- Time zone: UTC+2 (SAST)
- Postal code (street): 9978
- PO box: 9978
- Area code: 051

Fauresmith is located 130 km south west of Bloemfontein, South Africa. The town, named after Rev. Phillip Faure and Sir Harry Smith, is the second oldest town in the Free State.

Fauresmith is the only town in South Africa where the railway line runs down the centre of the main road.

The town is known in equestrian circles for the annual National Equestrian Endurance Race, during which the horses and riders must complete a grueling 205 km course during the three days of the event.

In the 2011 census, the town of Fauresmith proper had a population of 770, with 47.2% of residents identifying as Black African, 36.3% as White, and 14.3% as Coloured. Afrikaans was the most common first language in the town, spoken by 77.6% of the population, followed by Sotho at 9.7% and Tswana at 5.0%. The Coloured township of Frayville, bordering Fauresmith to the northwest, recorded a population of 660, and the Black township of Ipopeng had a population of 2,198, bringing the total population of the Fauresmith area to 3,628.

== History ==
Beginning around 1815, farmers from the northern Cape districts crossed the Orange River to expand their farming and grazing territory into the Riet and Modder river region. As the number of European settlers in the area increased due to the Great Treks of the 1830s, there was a growing need for a church, as many of the settlers had remained members of the distant Colesberg congregation. Several ministers visited the region to investigate, and after reporting back to the Graaff-Reinet church circuit and Cape synod, considerations began on plans to serve distant communities with regular ministry. The first church council in Fauresmith was formally elected on 11 March, 1848.

In addition to a church, the church council sought to construct a village with shops and a magistrate. After unsuccessful negotiations with the British Government to purchase land, a temporary church was built on the farm "Sannahspoort." At the end of 1849, the church council bought Sannahspoort for 14 000 rixdollars (£1050) and hired a surveyor to lay out a village and divide it into erven. One condition of sale was that no spirits or other strong liquor may have been sold on any of the plots. The selling of plots was the biggest income of the church at the time. The current congregations of the surrounding towns of Philippolis, Trompsburg, Edenburg, Petrusburg, Koffiefontein, Luckhoff and a great deal of Jacobsdal were part of the congregation.

Two years before the founding of the town, the intervention of the British government in the affairs of the Free State led to the military clash between Boer and Briton at the Battle of Boomplaats, about 30 km from the current Fauresmith.

On 30 August, 1851, a meeting was held at Sannahspoort. The heading of the minutes states "Fauresmith." It gained municipal status in 1859, though the Dutch Reformed Church maintained strong oversight of the town's affairs.

After Bloemfontein, Fauresmith was the most important town in the Free State. The first House of Assembly had to choose between the two to determine which would be the capital of the Free State. The vote went to Bloemfontein with a two-vote majority.

Nicolaas Havenga, a prominent 20th-century Afrikaner politician, was born on a farm outside Fauresmith on 1 May, 1882. Havenga represented the Fauresmith constituency in the House of Assembly from 1915 to 1940, and later became Minister of Finance from 1948 to 1954.

Since 1973, the town has been the site of the Fauresmith 200, an equestrian endurance ride where riders compete to cover some 200km over three days. The first race saw 17 riders compete, and the event has since grown to several hundred competitors each year.

== Climate ==
Like much of the Free State, the climate in Fauresmith is classified as a cold semi-arid steppe. The months between November and March are typically the hottest, with daily high temperatures regularly surpassing 30°C and some days with temperatures above 40°C. The weather from April to mid-August is characterized by more temperate weather, with daily highs often ranging between 15°C and 24°C and overnight lows frequently dropping below freezing. From mid-August through spring, daily highs fluctuate between 21°C and 35°C.

== Archaeology ==
Fauresmith is the name site for a stone tool industry that is often defined as a transitional industry between the Acheulian and the Middle Stone Age or as the end of the Acheulian or beginning of the MSA. The Fauresmith is found at a number of other archaeological sites such as Wonderwerk Cave and Kathu Pan where it is potentially dated to at least 420,000 years ago. The Fauresmith consists of MSA technology such as blades, points and prepared core technology as well as retaining handaxes from the Acheulian. The type sites are Brakfontien 321 and Riverview Estates Site VI.
