= Ben-Piet van Zyl =

South African rugby union player

- Full name: Barend Pieter van Zyl
- Born: 1 August 1935 Gwelo, Rhodesia
- Died: 10 March 1973 (aged 37)

Rugby union career
- Position: Wing three–quarter
Provincial / State sides
Years	Team	Apps	(Points)
- Western Province
International career
Years	Team	Apps	(Points)
1961	South Africa	1	(6)

Barend Pieter "Ben-Piet" van Zyl (1 August 1935 – 10 March 1973) was a South African international rugby union player.

The son of a Rhodesian–based pastor, Van Zyl was born in Gwelo and educated at Secondary School Trompsburg.

During his theology studies, Van Zyl played rugby for Maties and had a brief international career with the Springboks. He first appeared for the Springboks as a replacement player on their 1960–61 tour of Europe, after Hennie van Zyl was flown home due to the death of his father. His tour was limited to non international fixtures and included a match against the Barbarians. He gained his only Springboks cap against Ireland at Newlands in 1961, scoring two tries from the right wing. Three other players with the surname Van Zyl played that match, but none were related.

After retiring from rugby, Van Zyl remained involved in the sport as a selector for Eastern Free State and was otherwise occupied by his work as a church minister. He died of a heart attack in 1973 while refereeing a rugby match.

== See also ==
- List of South Africa national rugby union players
