= South African Class 6E1, Series 5 =

Type of electric locomotive

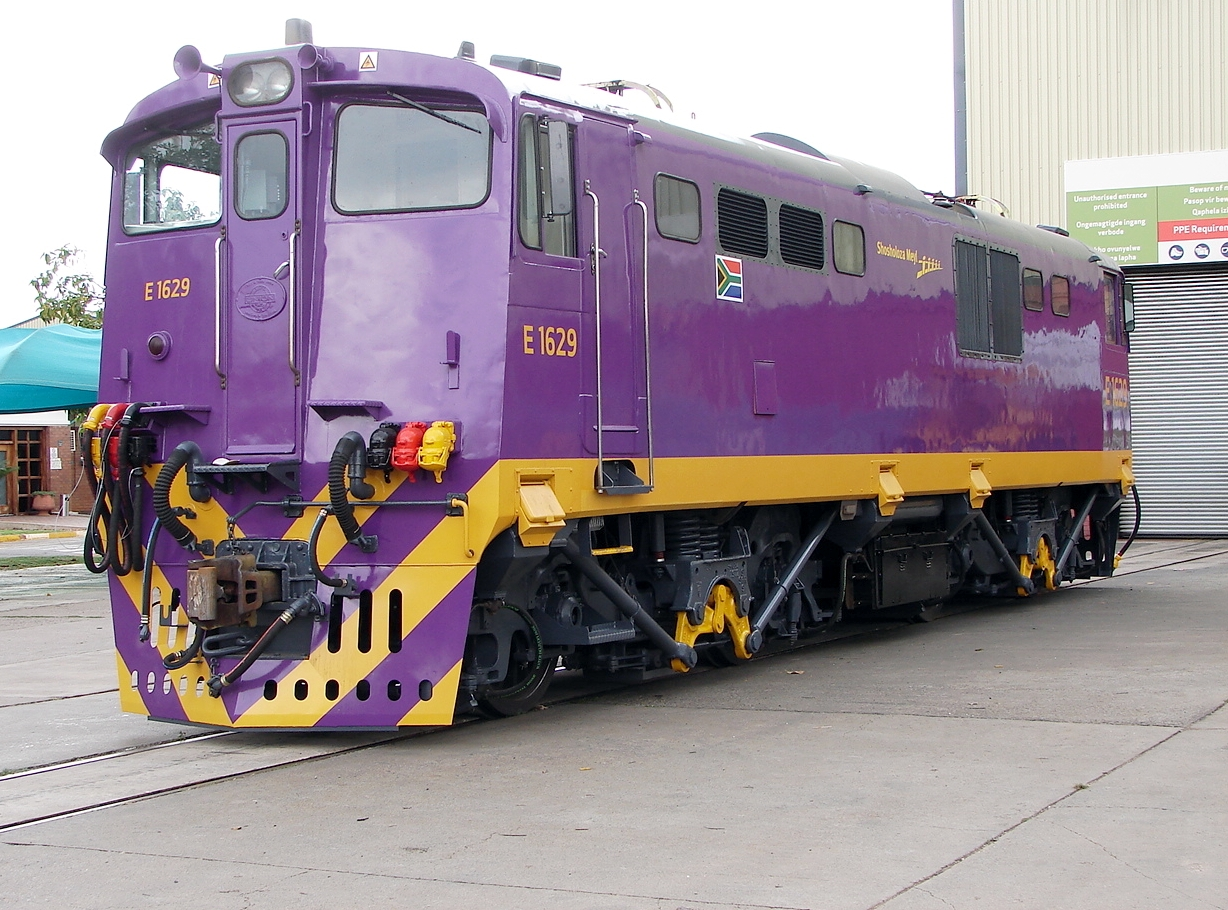
- E1629 at Koedoespoort, Pretoria, Gauteng, 8 October 2009
Type and origin
- Power type: Electric
- Designer: Union Carriage & Wagon
- Builder: Union Carriage & Wagon
- Model: UCW 6E1
- Build date: 1974-1976
- Total produced: 100
- Rebuilder: Transwerk; Transnet Engineering
- Rebuild date: 1978, 2010-2014
- Number rebuilt: 1 to Class Experimental AC; 65 to Class 18E, Series 2
Specifications
- Configuration
  - AAR: B-B
  - UIC: Bo'Bo'
  - Commonwealth: Bo-Bo
- Gauge: 3 ft 6 in (1,067 mm) Cape gauge
- Wheel diameter: 1,220 mm (48.03 in)
- Wheelbase: 11,279 mm (37 ft 0 in)
  - Bogie: 3,430 mm (11 ft 3 in)
- Pivot centres: 7,849 mm (25 ft 9 in)
- Panto shoes: 6,972 mm (22 ft 10 1/2 in)
- Length
  - Over couplers: 15,494 mm (50 ft 10 in)
  - Over body: 14,631 mm (48 ft 0 in)
- Width: 2,896 mm (9 ft 6 in)
- Height
  - Pantograph: 4,089 mm (13 ft 5 in)
  - Body height: 3,937 mm (12 ft 11 in)
- Axle load: 22,226 kg (49,000 lb)
- Adhesive weight: 88,904 kg (196,000 lb)
- Loco weight: 88,904 kg (196,000 lb)
- Electric system/s: 3 kV DC catenary
- Current pickup(s): Pantographs
- Traction motors: Four AEI-283AZ
  - Rating 1 hour: 623 kW (835 hp)
  - Continuous: 563 kW (755 hp)
- Gear ratio: 18:67
- Loco brake: Air & Regenerative
- Train brakes: Air & Vacuum
- Couplers: AAR knuckle
Performance figures
- Maximum speed: 113 km/h (70 mph)
- Power output
  - 1 hour: 2,492 kW (3,342 hp)
  - Continuous: 2,252 kW (3,020 hp)
- Tractive effort
  - Starting: 311 kN (70,000 lbf)
  - 1 hour: 221 kN (50,000 lbf)
  - Continuous: 193 kN (43,000 lbf) @ 40 km/h (25 mph)
Career
- Operators: South African Railways; Spoornet; Transnet Freight Rail; PRASA
- Class: Class 6E1
- Number in class: 99
- Numbers: E1546-E1599, E1601-E1645
- Delivered: 1974-1976
- First run: 1974

The South African Railways Class 6E1, Series 5 of 1974 was an electric locomotive.

Between 1974 and 1976, the South African Railways placed one hundred Class 6E1, Series 5 electric locomotives with a Bo-Bo wheel arrangement in mainline service. One of them was later withdrawn from revenue service for use as an experimental 25 kV AC locomotive.

== Manufacturer ==
The 3 kV DC Class 6E1, Series 5 electric locomotive was designed and built for the South African Railways (SAR) by Union Carriage & Wagon (UCW) in Nigel, Transvaal, with the electrical equipment being supplied by the General Electric Company (GEC).

One hundred units were delivered between 1974 and 1976, numbered in the range from E1546 to E1645. Like Series 1 to 4, Series 5 units were equipped with four AEI-283AZ axle-hung traction motors. UCW did not allocate builder's numbers to the locomotives it built for the SAR and used the SAR unit numbers for their record keeping.

== Characteristics ==
=== Orientation ===
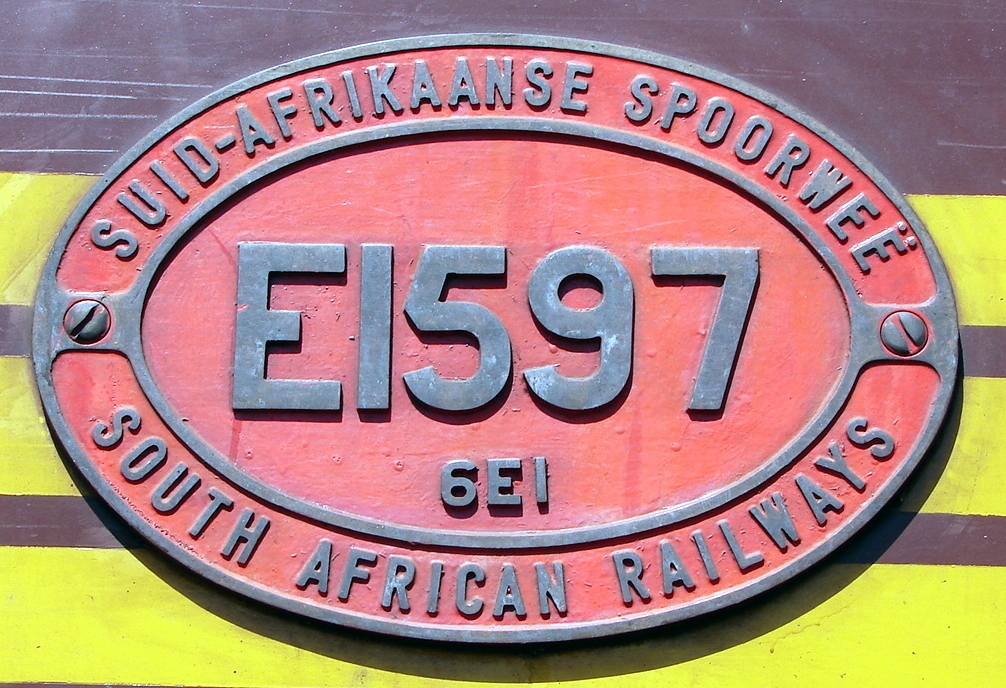
Builder's plate

These dual cab locomotives had a roof access ladder on one side only, just to the right of the cab access door. The roof access ladder end was marked as the no. 2 end. A corridor along the centre of the locomotive connected the cabs which were identical apart from the fact that the handbrake was located in cab 2. A pantograph hook stick was stowed in a tube mounted below the lower edge of the locomotive body on the roof access ladder side. The units had one square and two rectangular access panels along the lower half of the body on the roof access ladder side, and only square access panel on the opposite side.

=== Series identifying features ===
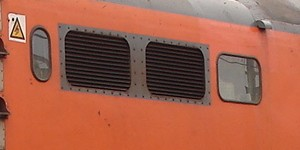
Grilles without beading on Series 5 no. E1631

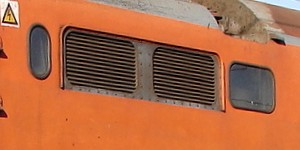
Grilles with beading on Series 6 no. E1672

The Class 6E1 was produced in eleven series over a period of nearly sixteen years. While some Class 6E1 series are visually indistinguishable from their predecessors or successors, some externally visible changes did occur over the years.

The Series 3 to Series 5 locomotives were visually indistinguishable from each other, the only externally visible difference being the narrower stirrup middle step below the side doors of the first fifty Series 3 units, those in the number range from E1296 to E1345.

The Series 6 and 7 locomotives are also visually indistinguishable from each other, but can be distinguished from all the older series by the rainwater beading that had been added above the small grilles on the sides aft of the side doors.

== Service ==
The Class 6E1 family saw service all over both 3 kV DC mainline and branch line networks, the smaller Cape Western mainline between Cape Town and Beaufort West and the larger network which covers portions of the Northern Cape, the Free State, Natal, Gauteng, North West and Mpumalanga.

== Reclassification and rebuilding ==
=== Test bed for 25 kV AC research ===
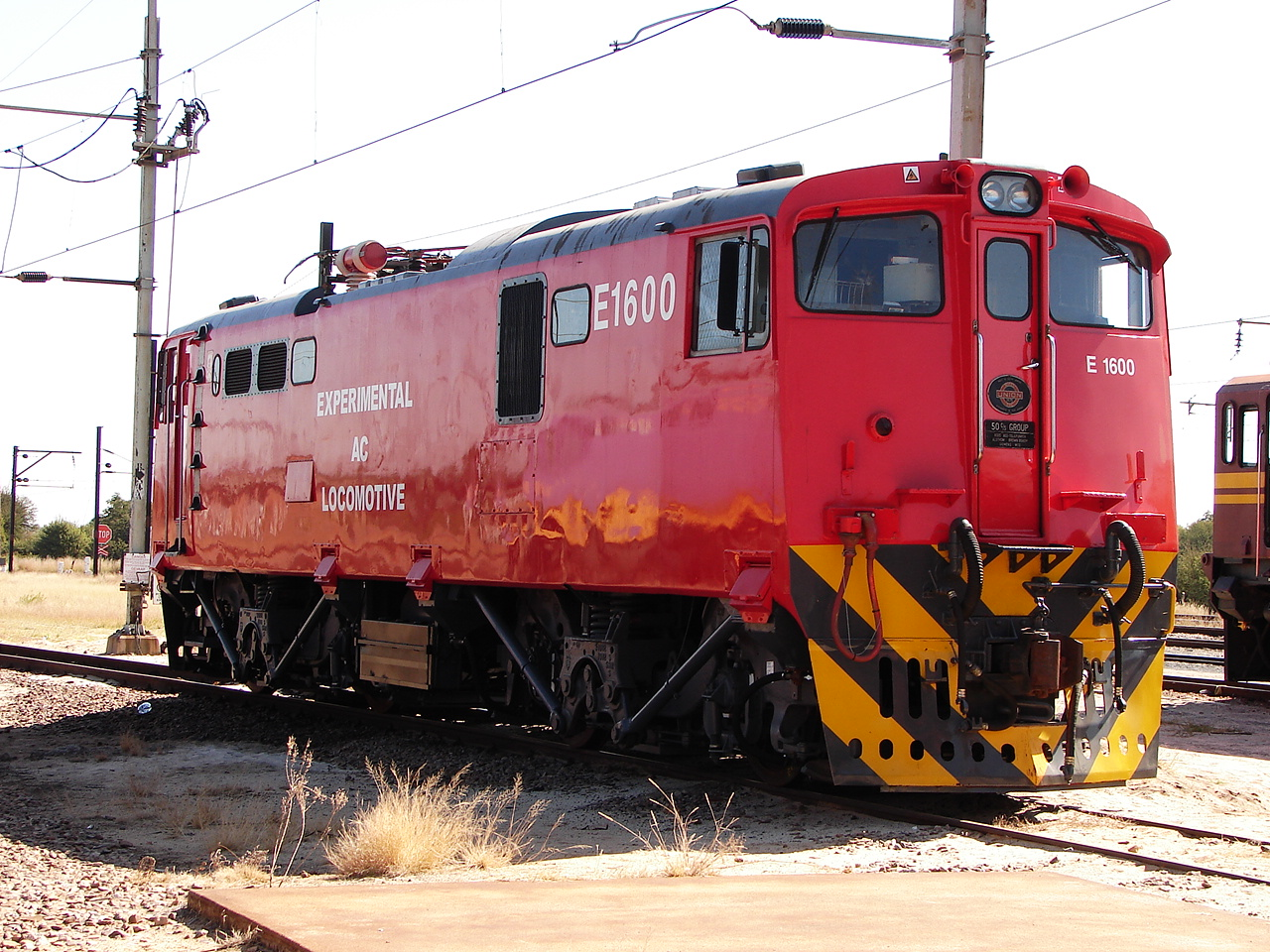
Class Experimental AC no. E1600

One of the Series 5 units, no. E1600, was withdrawn from revenue service in 1978, rebuilt as a test-bed for 25 kV AC electrification and reclassified to Class Experimental AC. This was done while the electrification of the four isolated 25 kV routes was in progress. No. E1600 was never returned to revenue service. The four 25 kV AC routes are:

- From Pyramid South to Pietersburg and via Rustenburg to Thabazimbi.
- From Ermelo to Richards Bay.
- From Port Elizabeth to De Aar and from there northward to Kimberley and southward to Beaufort West.
- From East London to Springfontein.

No. E1600 is set to be preserved for the national collection by the SA Heritage Agency and Transnet Heritage Foundation.(stored Pyramid south 03/2020)

=== Reclassification to Class 16E ===
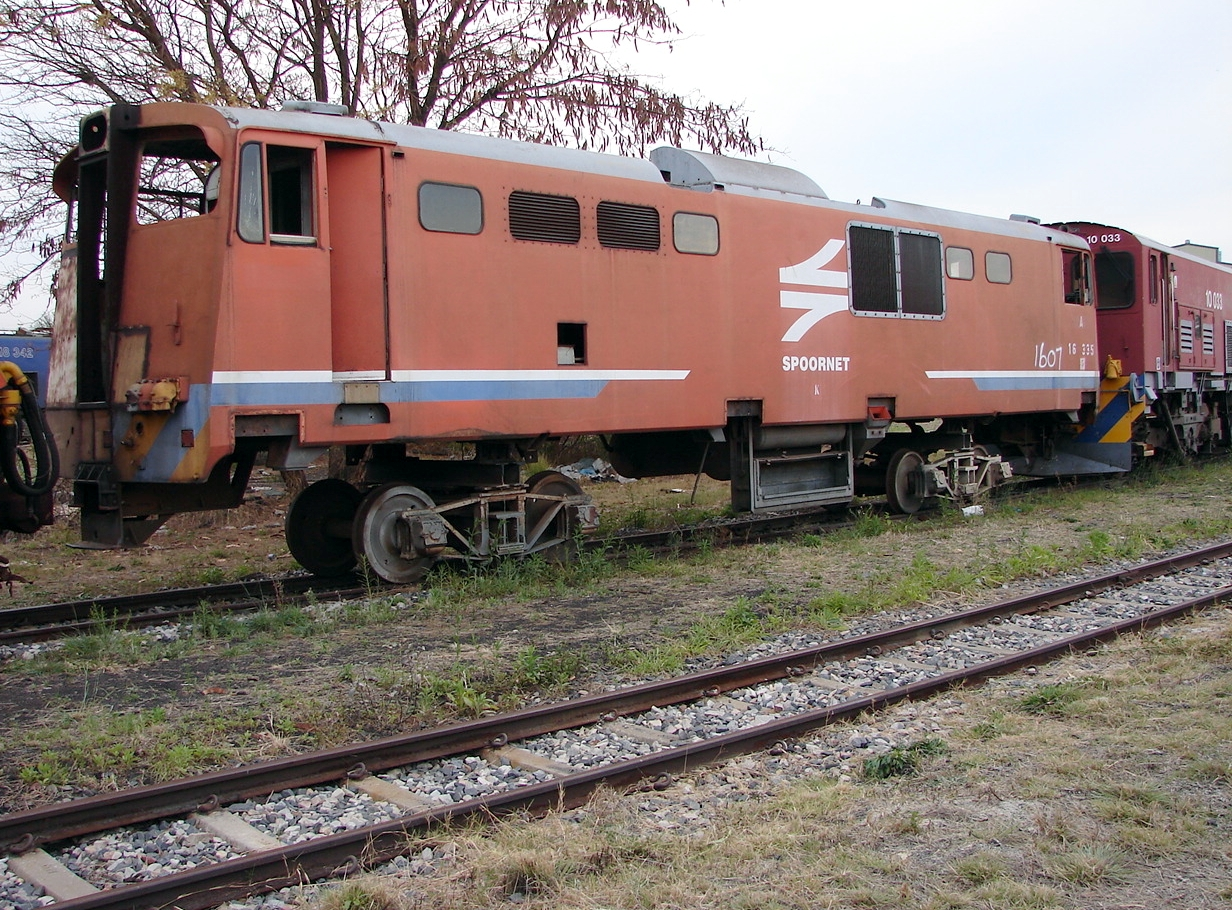
No. E1607 as Class 16E no. 16-335A, Koedoespoort, 2 October 2009

During 1990 and 1991, Spoornet semi-permanently coupled several pairs of otherwise largely unmodified Class 6E1 units, reclassified them to Class 16E and allocated a single locomotive number to each pair, with the individual units in the pairs inscribed "A" or "B". The aim was to accomplish savings on cab maintenance by coupling the units at their no. 1 ends, abandoning the no. 1 end cabs in terms of maintenance and using only the no. 2 end cabs.

Two known Series 5 locomotives, numbers E1549 and E1607, were part of such Class 16E pairs and became Class 16E numbers 16-319B and 16-335A respectively.

=== Rebuilding to Class 18E ===
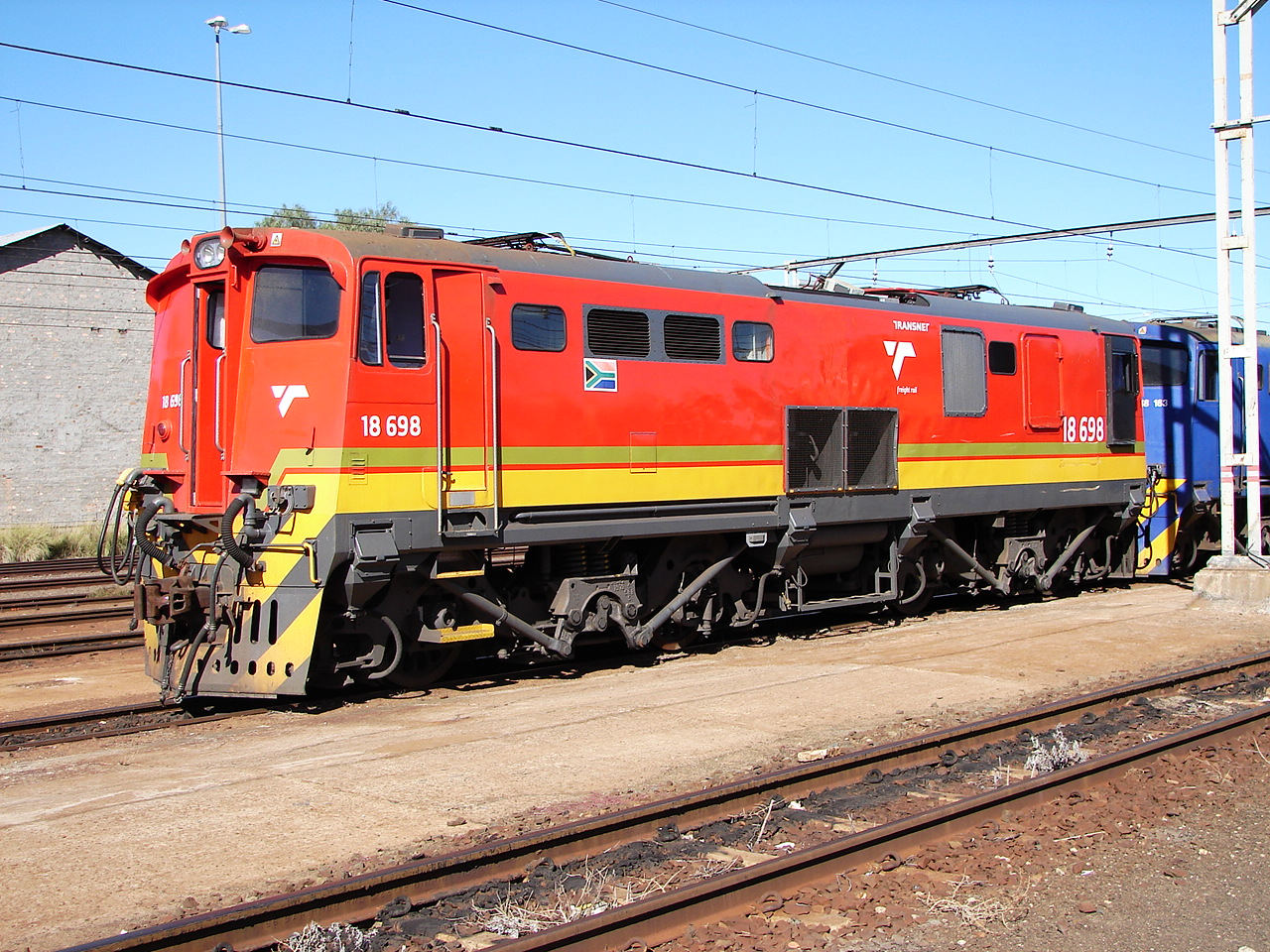
Cab 1 of Class 18E no. 18-698, ex Class 6E1 no. E1553, Beaufort West, 29 May 2013

Beginning in 2000, Spoornet began a project to rebuild Series 2 to 11 Class 6E1 locomotives to Class 18E, Series 1 and Series 2 at the Transnet Rail Engineering (TRE) workshops at Koedoespoort. In the process, the cab at the no. 1 end was stripped of all controls and the driver's front and side windows were blanked off to have a toilet installed, thereby forfeiting the unit's bi-directional ability.

Since the driving cab's noise level had to be below 85 decibels, cab 2 was selected as the Class 18E driving cab primarily based on its lower noise level compared to cab 1, which is closer and more exposed to the compressor's noise and vibration. Another factor was the closer proximity of cab 2 to the low voltage switch panel. The fact that the handbrake was located in cab 2 was not a deciding factor, but was considered an additional benefit.

The known Class 6E1, Series 5 units which were used in this project were all rebuilt to Class 18E, Series 2 locomotives. Their numbers and renumbering details are shown in the table. This list is virtually complete with only seven unknowns remaining:

- The unit number of the Class 6E1 unit that was rebuilt to Class 18E no. 18-851 is not known.
- The status of six units listed as "uncompleted", of which the existence still need to be confirmed by sighting or photographic evidence. The Class 18E rebuilding program was terminated abruptly in late 2014 with about half a dozen units in various stages of completion on the rebuilding line. Some reports indicated that the incomplete units would be forwarded to Danskraal or Durban for completion, but it could not be confirmed that this actually took place.

Class 6E1, Series 5 units rebuilt to Class 18E as on 19 January 2015
Count	6E1 no.	Year built	18E no.	18E series	Year rebuilt	Notes
1	E1546	1974-75	18-726	2	2013	
2	E1547	1974-75	18-805	2	2014	
3	E1551	1974-75	18-837	2		Uncompleted
4	E1553	1974-75	18-698	2	2012	
5	E1554	1974-75	18-849	2		Uncompleted
6	E1556	1974-75	18-835	2		Uncompleted
7	E1557	1975	18-777	2	2013	c. 2013
8	E1558	1975	18-828	2	2014	
9	E1560	1975	18-822	2	2014	
10	E1561	1975	18-668	2	2011	
11	E1562	1975	18-755	2	2013	
12	E1563	1975	18-800	2	2014	c. 2014
13	E1564	1975	18-727	2	2013	
14	E1566	1975	18-661	2	2011	
15	E1567	1975	18-705	2	2012	
16	E1568	1975	18-723	2	2013	
17	E1569	1975	18-778	2	2013	c. 2013
18	E1570	1975	18-734	2	2013	
19	E1571	1975	18-670	2	2012	
20	E1572	1975	18-754	2	2013	
21	E1573	1975	18-642	2	2010	
22	E1575	1975	18-770	2	2013	
23	E1576	1975	18-693	2	2012	
24	E1577	1975	18-823	2	2014	
25	E1578	1975	18-641	2	2010	
26	E1579	1975	18-827	2	2014	
27	E1580	1975	18-820	2	2014	
28	E1581	1975	18-686	2	2012	
29	E1583	1975	18-821	2	2014	
30	E1584	1975	18-756	2	2013	
31	E1585	1975	18-825	2	2014	
32	E1586	1975	18-818	2	2014	
33	E1588	1975	18-794	2	2014	c. 2014
34	E1589	1975	18-769	2	2013	
35	E1590	1975	18-792	2	2014	c. 2014
36	E1591	1975	18-817	2	2014	
37	E1598	1975	18-819	2	2014	
38	E1594	1975	18-733	2	2013	
39	E1596	1975	18-842	2		Uncompleted
40	E1602	1975	18-798	2	2014	c. 2014
41	E1604	1975	18-830	2		Uncompleted
42	E1606	1975	18-814	2	2014	
43	E1608	1975	18-815	2	2014	
44	E1609	1975	18-663	2	2011	
45	E1610	1975	18-711	2	2012	
46	E1613	1975	18-789	2	2014	c. 2014
47	E1614	1975-76	18-715	2	2012	
48	E1615	1975-76	18-809	2	2014	
49	E1616	1975-76	18-750	2	2013	
50	E1617	1975-76	18-813	2	2014	
51	E1620	1975-76	18-731	2	2013	
52	E1621	1976	18-795	2	2014	c. 2014
53	E1622	1976	18-710	2	2012	
54	E1623	1976	18-816	2	2014	
55	E1624	1976	18-722	2	2012	
56	E1625	1976	18-716	2	2012	
57	E1626	1976	18-639	2	2010	
58	E1627	1976	18-810	2	2014	
59	E1628	1976	18-647	2	2010	
60	E1630	1976	18-703	2	2012	
61	E1631	1976	18-844	2		Uncompleted
62	E1632	1976	18-637	2	2010	
63	E1633	1976	18-811	2	2014	
64	E1634	1976	18-697	2	2012	
65	E1635	1976	18-664	2	2011	
66	E1637	1976	18-729	2	2013	
67	E1638	1976	18-713	2	2012	
68	E1639	1976	18-709	2	2012	
69	E1640	1976	18-737	2	2013	
70	E1641	1976	18-700	2	2012	
71	E1644	1976	18-662	2	2011	

== Liveries ==
The whole series was delivered in the SAR Gulf Red livery with signal red cowcatchers, yellow whiskers and with the number plates on the sides mounted on three-stripe yellow wings. In the 1990s many of the Series 5 units began to be repainted in the Spoornet orange livery with a yellow and blue chevron pattern on the cowcatchers. Several later received the Spoornet maroon livery. In the late 1990s at least one was repainted in the Spoornet blue livery with solid numbers and at least four in the Spoornet blue livery with outline numbers. In the Passenger Rail Agency of South Africa (PRASA) era after 2008, at least one was repainted in the Shosholoza Meyl purple livery and one in the PRASA light blue livery.

== Illustration ==
The main picture shows no. E1629 in the Passenger Rail Agency of South Africa (PRASA) Shosholoza Meyl livery. Illustrated below are some of the other liveries in which Series 5 locomotives served.

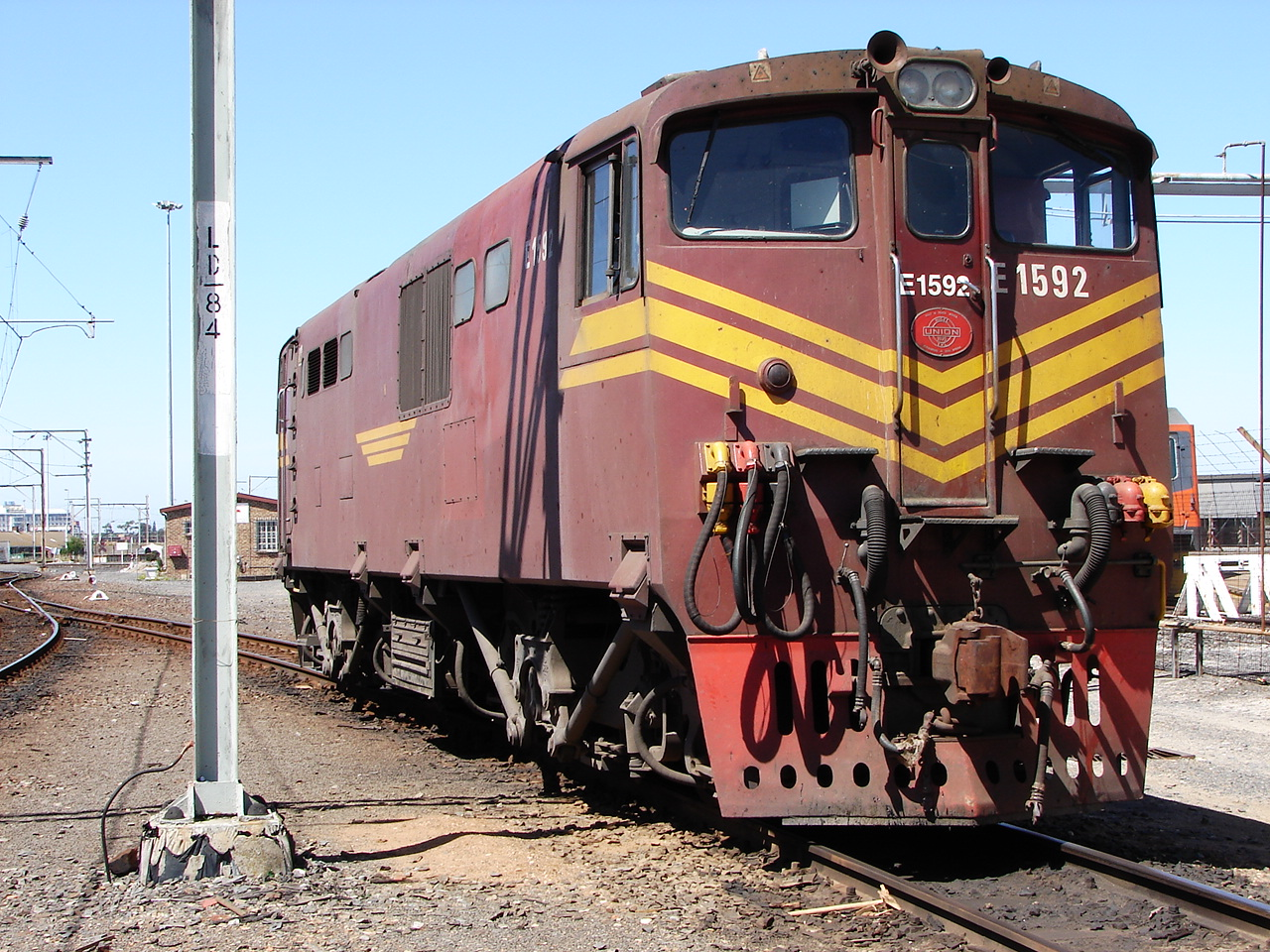
No. E1592 in SAR Gulf Red & yellow whiskers livery at Bellville Depot, Cape Town, 21 October 2009

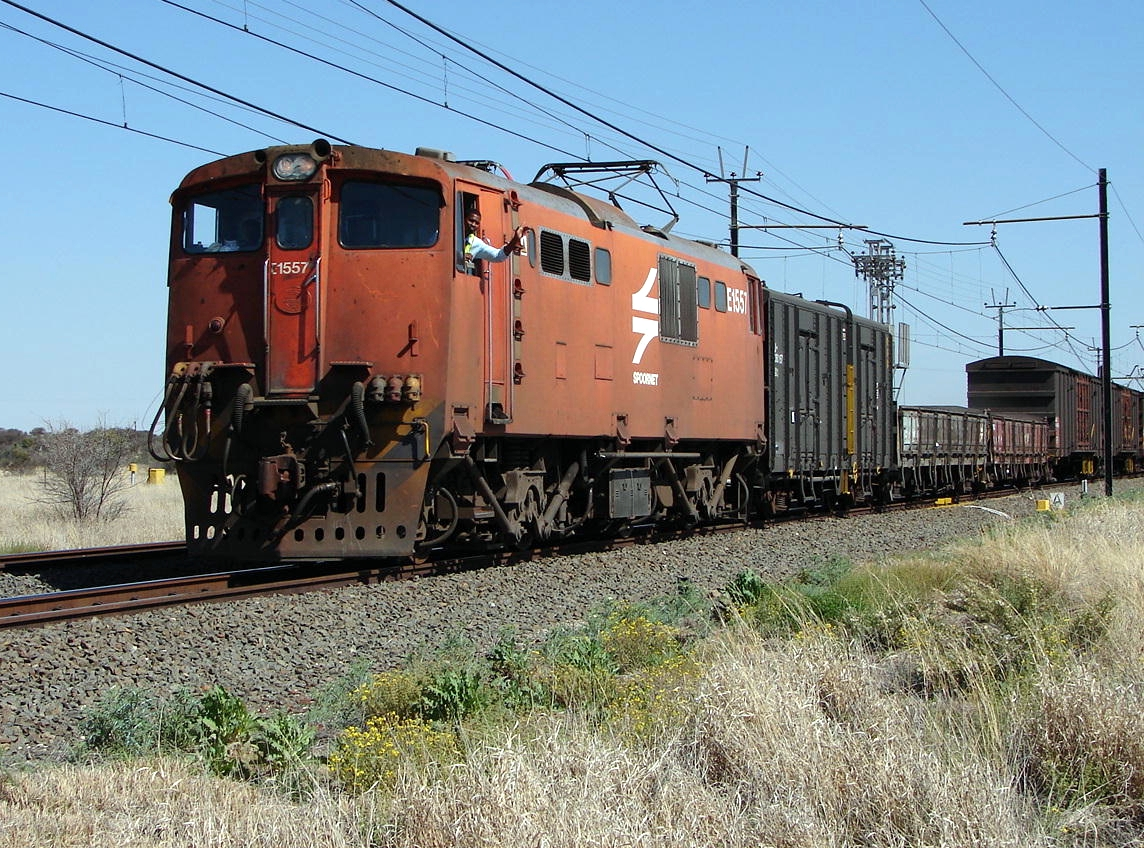
No. E1557 in Spoornet orange livery at Slypklip near Warrenton, Northern Cape, 22 September 2006

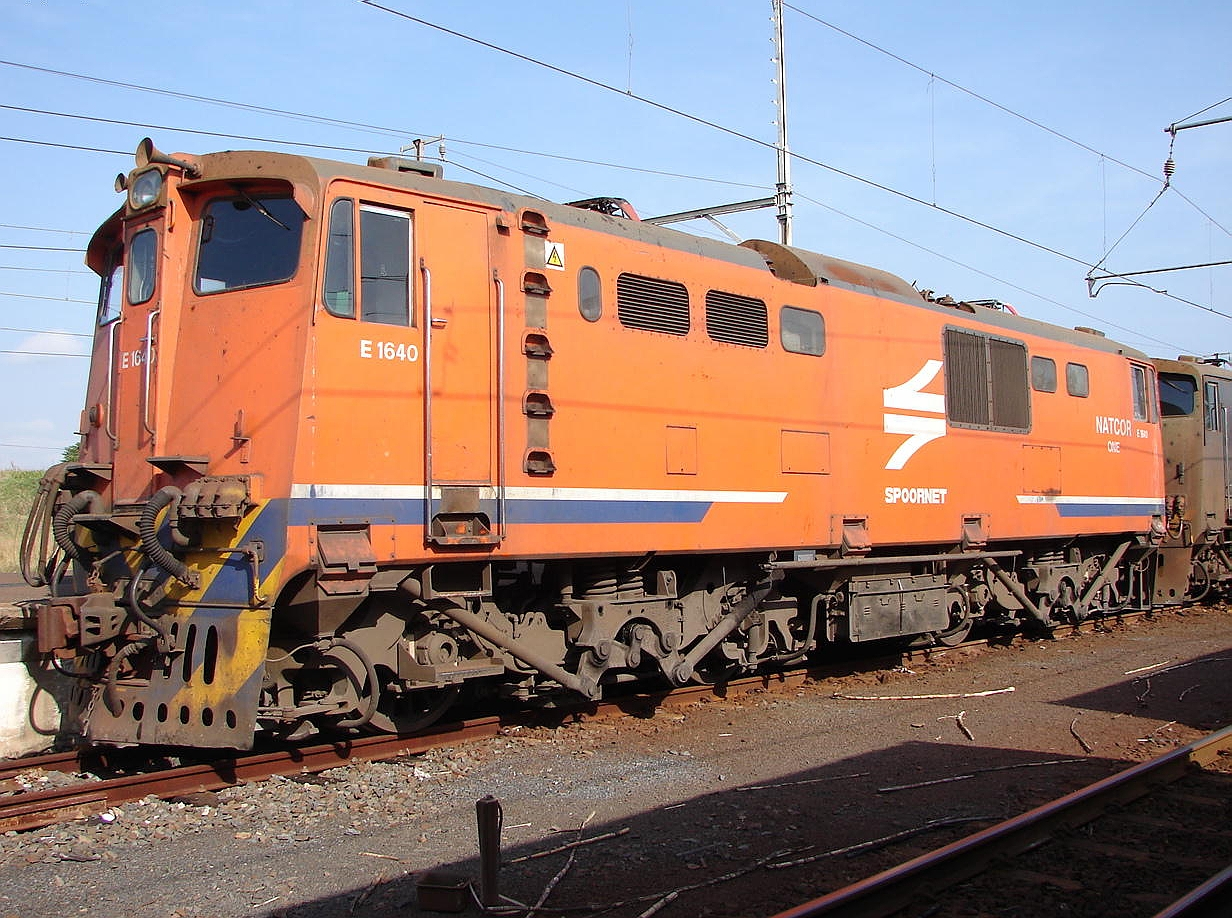
No. E1640 in Spoornet lined orange livery at Empangeni, Kwa-Zulu Natal, 14 August 2007

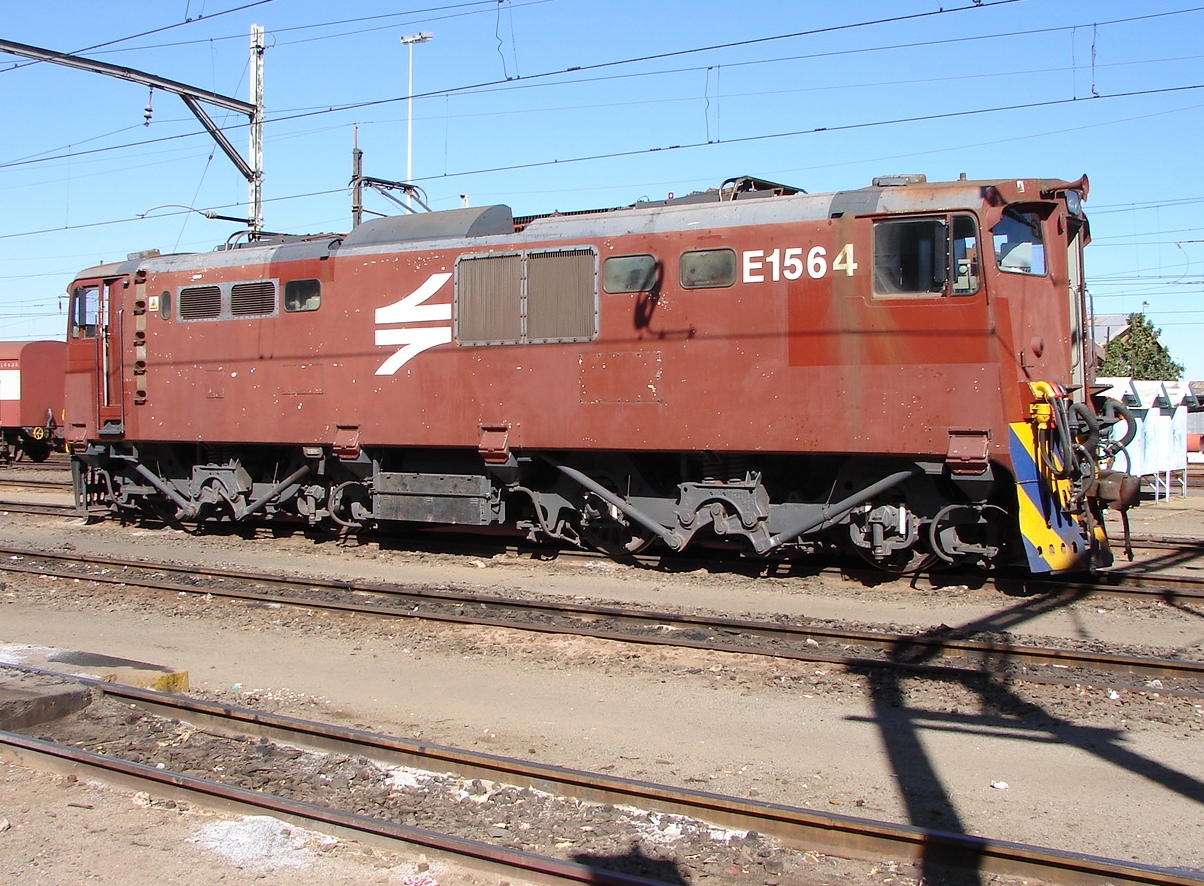
No. E1564 in the correct Spoornet maroon livery without "SPOORNET" at Beaconsfield, 17 September 2009

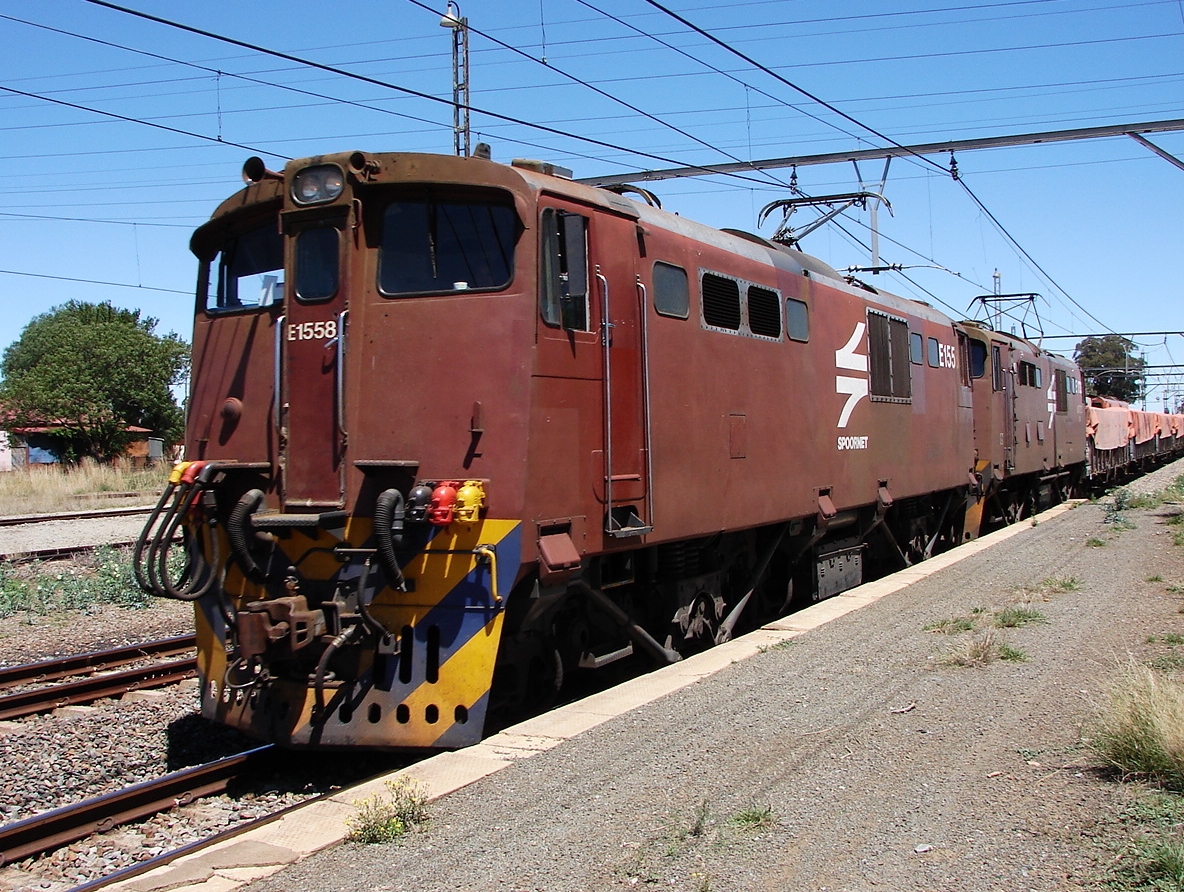
No. E1558 in an incorrect Spoornet maroon livery with "SPOORNET" at Orkney, 13 October 2009

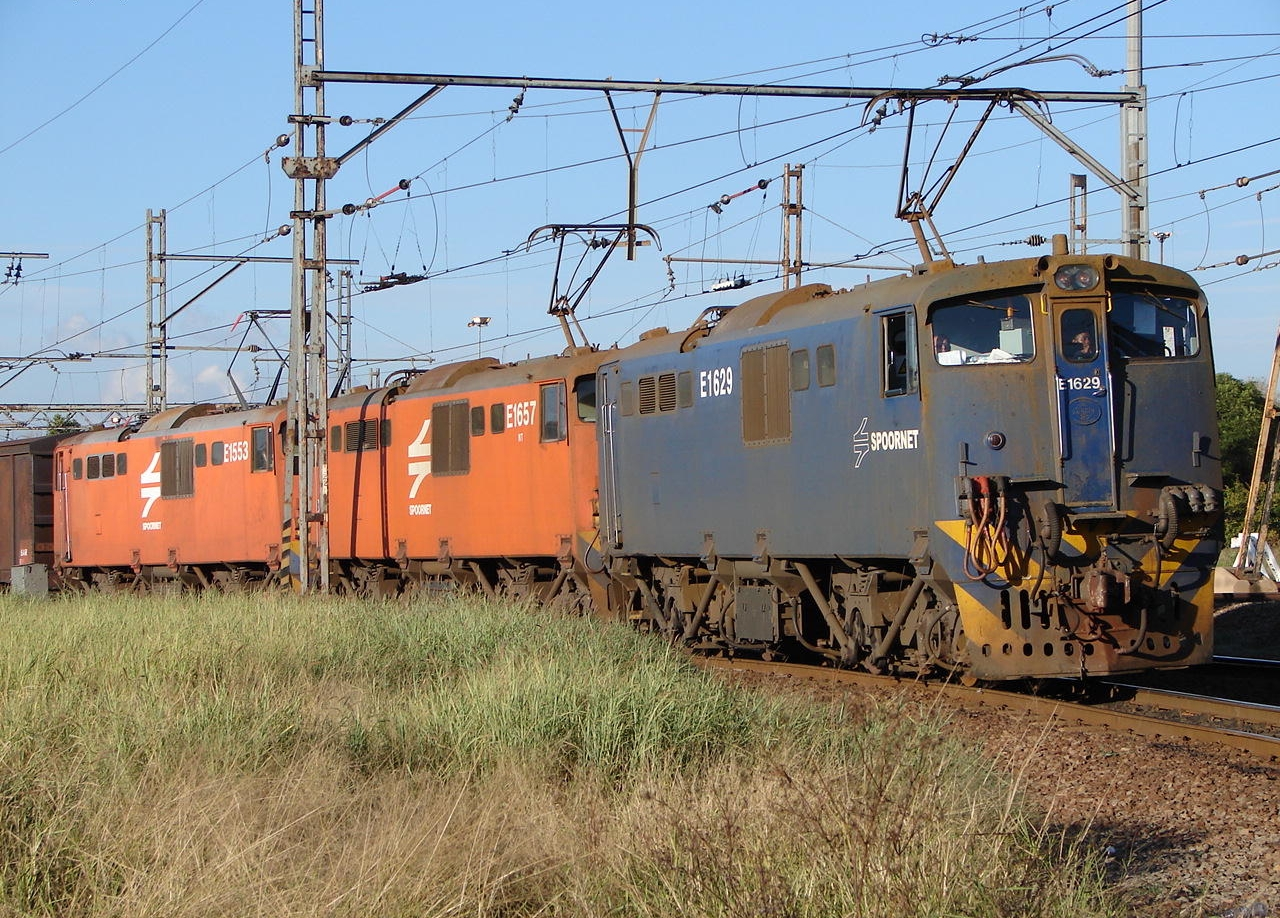
No. E1629 in Spoornet blue livery with solid numbers at Capital Park, Pretoria, Gauteng, 4 May 2006

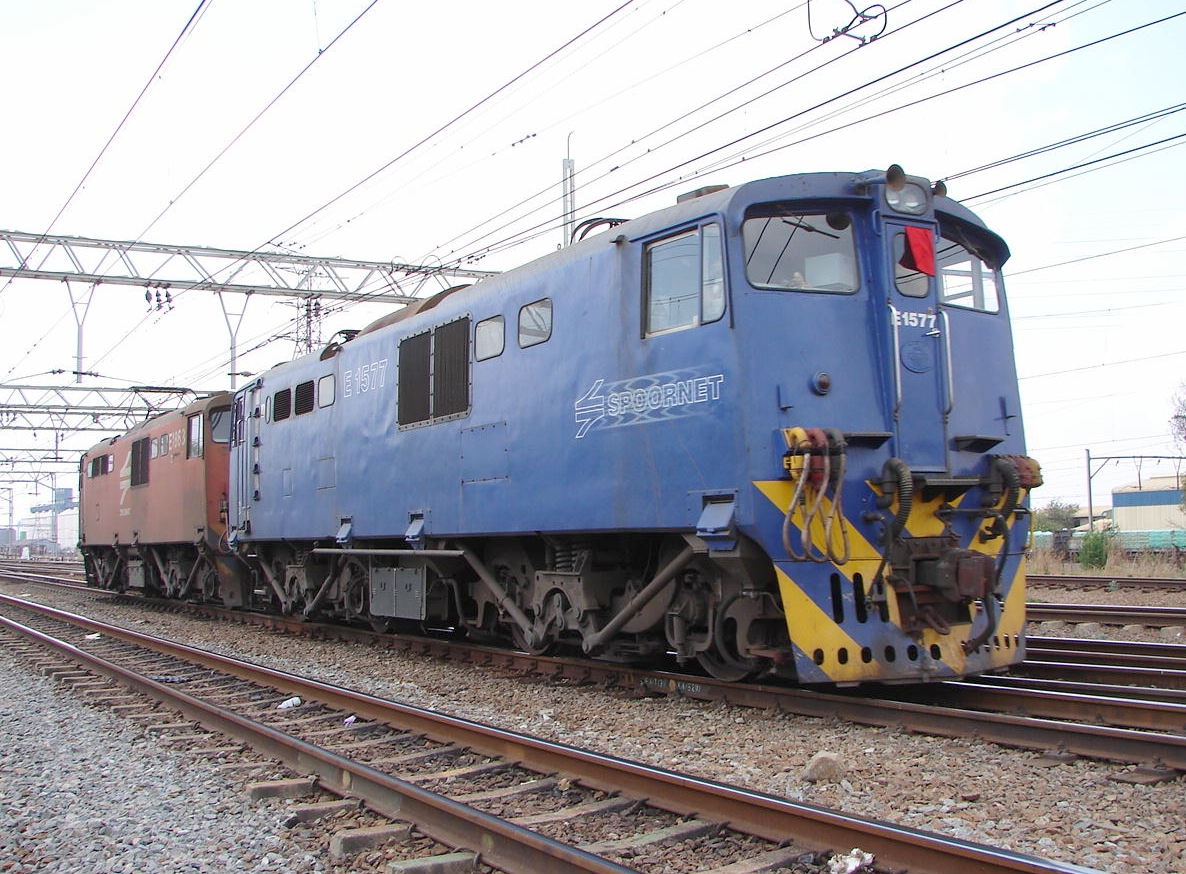
No. E1577 in Spoornet blue livery with outline numbers at Kaalfontein, Gauteng, 3 October 2006

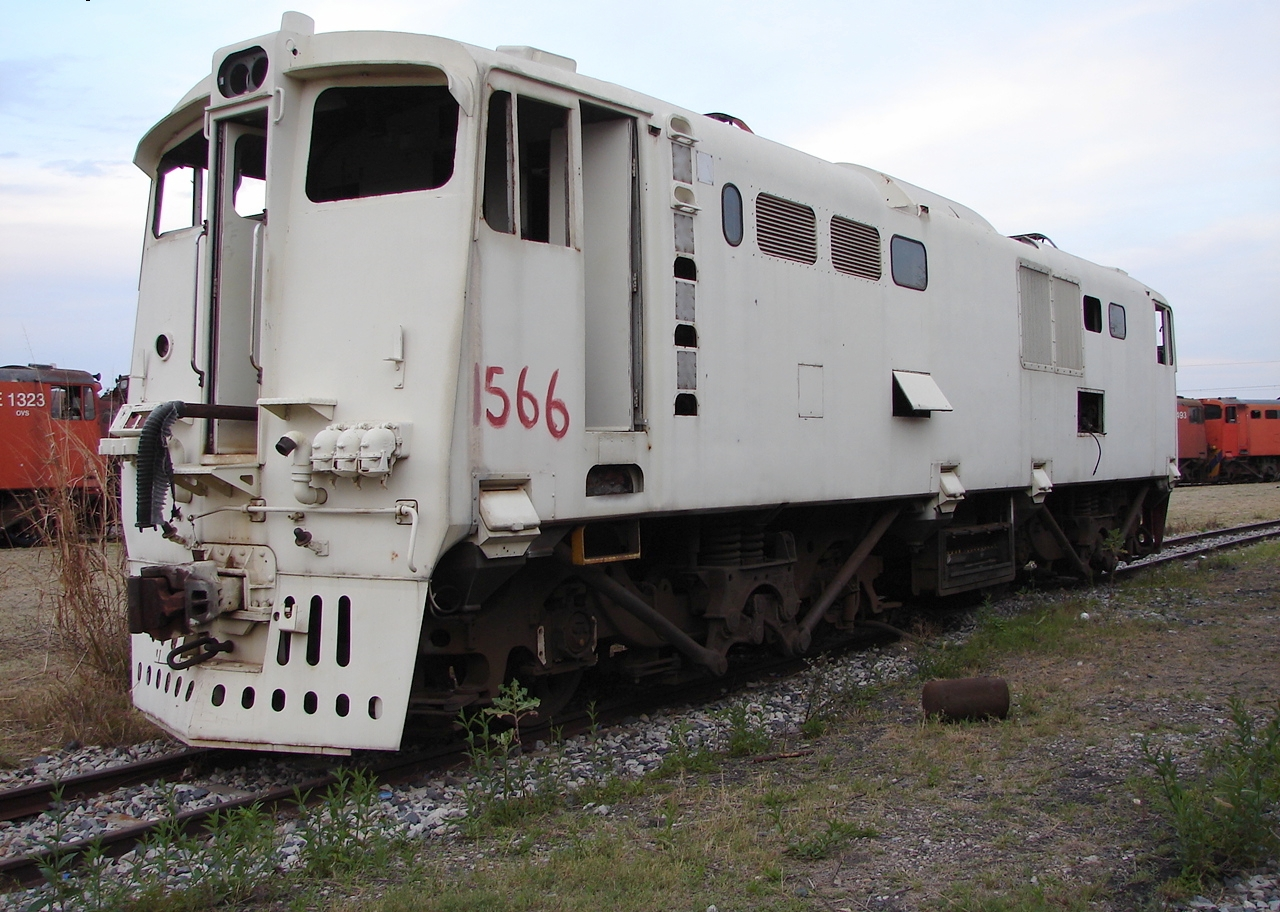
No. E1566 in white primer awaiting rebuilding at Koedoespoort, Pretoria, Gauteng, 2 October 2009

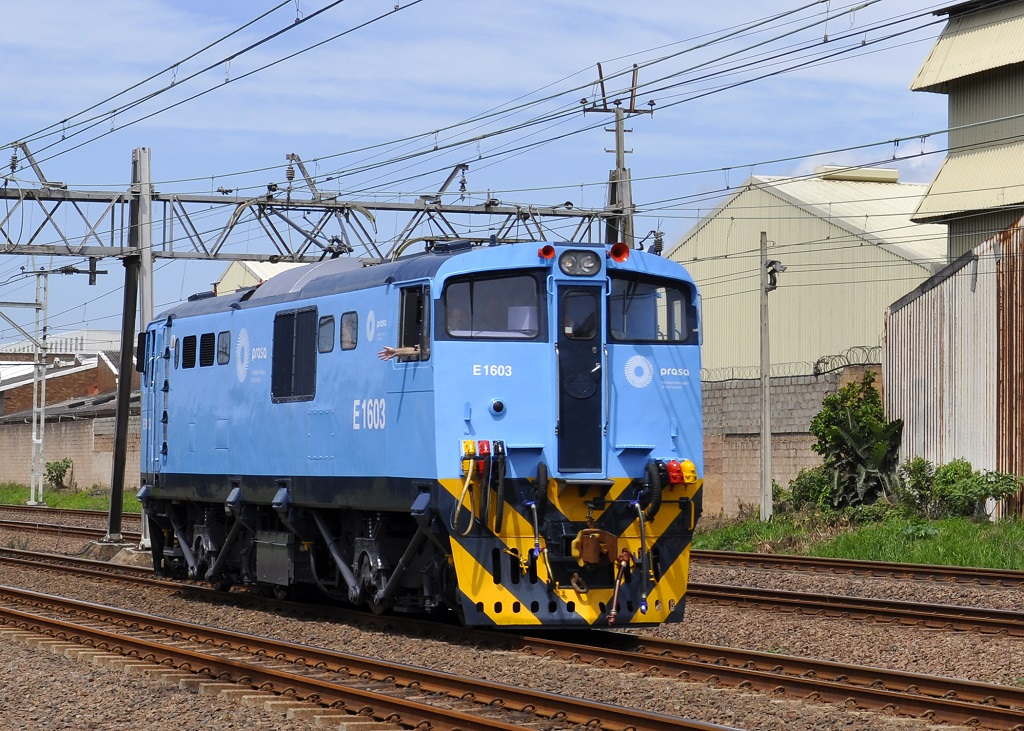
No. E1603 in Passenger Rail Agency of South Africa blue livery, Durban, 24 November 2014
