= South African Class Experimental AC =

Type of electric locomotive

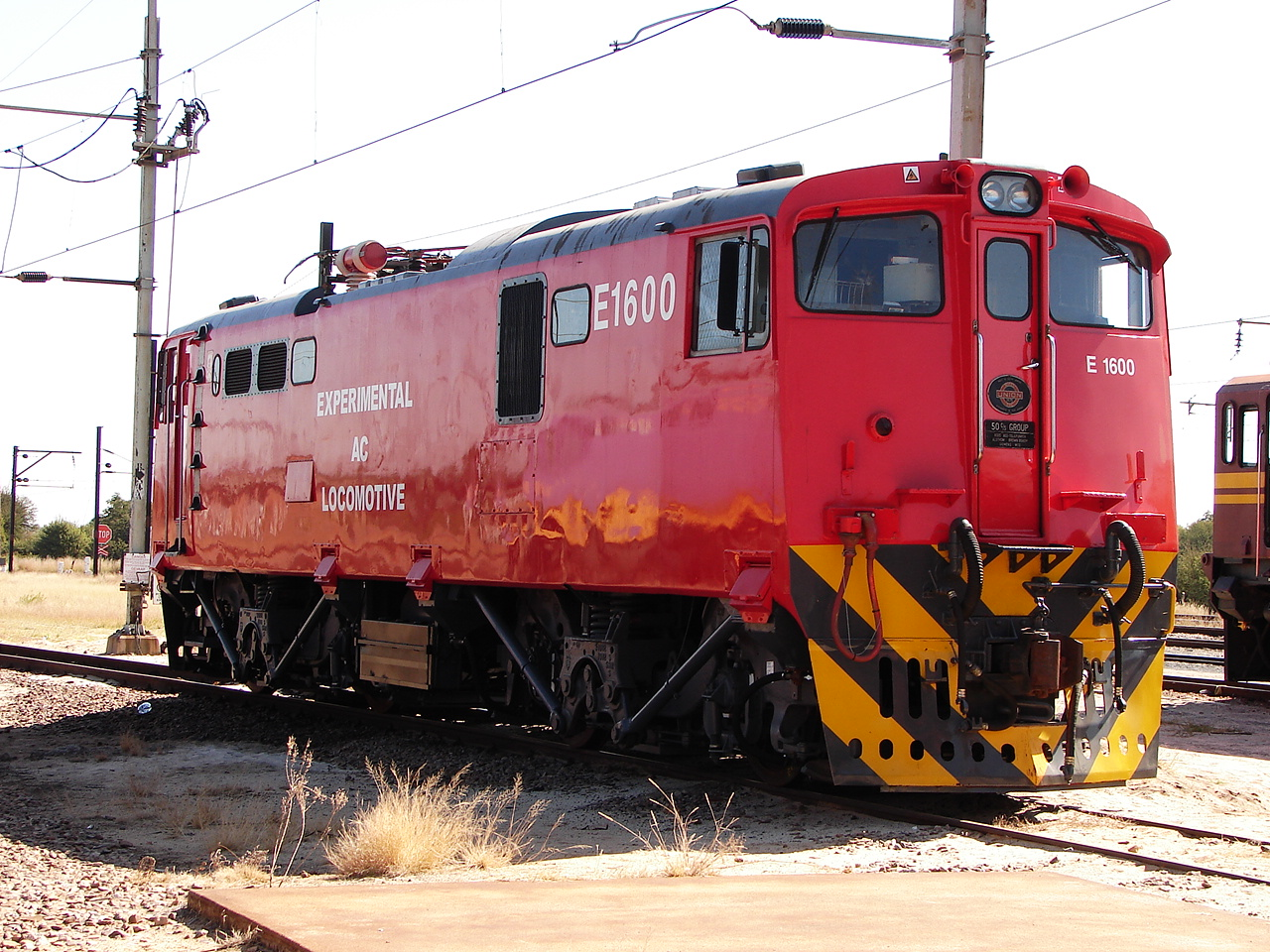
- E1600 at Pyramid South, Pretoria in May 2013
Type and origin
- Power type: Electric
- Designer: Union Carriage & Wagon
- Builder: Union Carriage & Wagon; Transwerk
- Model: UCW 6E1
- Build date: 1978
- Total produced: 1
Specifications
- Configuration
  - Commonwealth: Bo-Bo
- Gauge: 1,067 mm (3 ft 6 in)
- Wheel diameter: 1.22 m (48 in)
- Wheelbase: 11.28 m (37 ft 0 in)
  - Bogie: 3.43 m (11 ft 3 in)
- Pivot centres: 7.85 m (25 ft 9 in)
- Length
  - Over couplers: 15.49 m (50 ft 10 in)
  - Over body: 14.63 m (48 ft 0 in)
- Width: 2.90 m (9 ft 6 in)
- Height
  - Pantograph: 4.29 m (14 ft 1 in)
  - Body height: 3.94 m (12 ft 11 in)
- Axle load: 21.38 t (47,100 lb)
- Adhesive weight: 85.50 t (188,500 lb)
- Loco weight: 85.50 t (188,500 lb)
- Electric system/s: 25 kV 50 Hz AC catenary
- Current pickup(s): Pantograph
- Traction motors: 4 AEI 283AZ
  - Rating 1 hour: 623 kW (835 hp)
  - Continuous: 563 kW (755 hp)
- Gear ratio: 18:67
- Loco brake: Air
- Train brakes: Air & Vacuum
- Couplers: AAR knuckle
Performance figures
- Maximum speed: 113 km/h (70 mph)
- Power output
  - 1 hour: 2,492 kW (3,342 hp)
  - Continuous: 2,252 kW (3,020 hp)
- Tractive effort
  - Starting: 330 kN (74,000 lbf)
  - 1 hour: 218 kN (49,000 lbf)
  - Continuous: 190 kN (43,000 lbf)
Career
- Operators: South African Railways; Spoornet; Transnet Freight Rail
- Class: Class Experimental AC
- Number in class: 1
- Numbers: E1600
- First run: 1978

The South African Railways Class Experimental AC of 1978 is an electric locomotive.

In 1974 and 1975 the South African Railways placed 100 Class 6E1, Series 5 locomotives with a Bo-Bo wheel arrangement in mainline service. In 1978 one was withdrawn from revenue service for use as an experimental 25 kV AC locomotive. It was rebuilt and reclassified to Class Experimental AC.

== Manufacturer ==
The 3 kV DC Class 6E1, Series 5 electric locomotive was designed and built for the South African Railways by Union Carriage & Wagon (UCW) in Nigel, Transvaal.

== Orientation ==
These dual cab locomotives have a roof access ladder on one side only, just to the right of the cab access door. The roof access ladder end is marked as the no. 2 end. A corridor along the centre of the locomotive connects the cabs.

== Test bed for 25 kV AC research ==
In 1978, E1600 was withdrawn from revenue service and rebuilt as a test-bed for use during 25 kV AC electrification and reclassified to the sole Class Experimental AC. It was used for testing to detect and eliminate potential problems during the electrification of the four isolated 25 kV networks. These networks are:

- Pyramid South to Pietersburg and via Rustenburg to Thabazimbi
- Ermelo to Richards Bay
- Port Elizabeth via Noupoort to De Aar and from there northward to Kimberley and southward to Beaufort West
- East London to Springfontein

The unit's single pantograph and its electronic and electric equipment were manufactured by the 50 ^{c}/s Group, a consortium consisting of ACEC of Belgium, AEG-Telefunken and Siemens of Germany, Alsthom-Atlantique and Société MTE of France, and Brown Boveri of Switzerland. The same consortium also designed the 25 kV AC Class 7E locomotives which were placed in service on the four 25 kV networks.

The vacuum circuit breaker was supplied by GEC. The original Class 6E1 AEI-283AZ traction motors, manufactured by Associated Electrical Industries, were retained and the locomotive used a thyristor-diode rectifier set for the traction motor DC power supply. Mechanical components were supplied by UCW.

Apart from the inscriptions painted on the locomotive sides, the Class Experimental AC locomotive can be visually distinguished from regular Class 6E1 locomotives by the single pantograph on its no. 2 end instead of the usual two pantographs, one on each end, as well as by the large grilles on the sides. The Class 6E1 has two large grilles to the right of centre on each side while no. E1600 has only one such grille on the roof access ladder side and three on the opposite side.
