= Gariep Dam (town) =

Gariep Dam Gariepdam
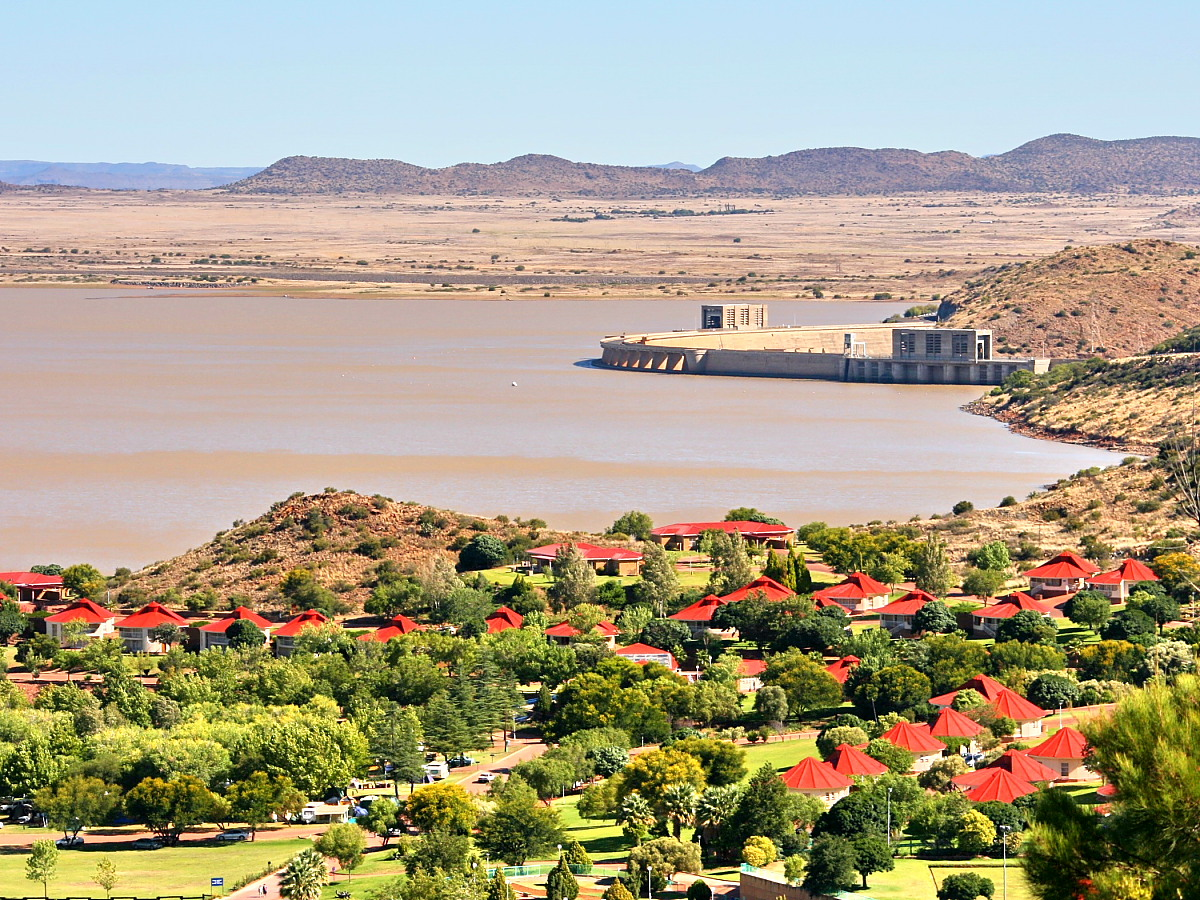
- View over Gariep Dam

- Location within Free State (South African province) Location within South Africa
- Coordinates: 30.6°S 25.5°E
- Country: South Africa
- Province: Free State
- District: Xhariep
- Municipality: Kopanong
- Established: ~1964

Government
  - Type: Municipality
  - Mayor: Xolile Mathwa (ANC)

Area
  - Total: 24.83 km^{2} (9.59 sq mi)
- Elevation: 1,320 m (4,330 ft)

Population (2011)
  - Total: 1,568
  - Density: 63.15/km^{2} (163.6/sq mi)

Racial makeup (2011)
  - Black African: 31.0%
  - Coloured: 47.6%
  - Indian/Asian: 0.4%
  - White: 19.6%
  - Other: 1.3%

First languages (2011)
  - Afrikaans: 76.9%
  - Xhosa: 11.1%
  - English: 4.9%
  - Sotho: 4.6%
  - Other: 2.5%
- Time zone: UTC+2 (SAST)
- Postal code (street): 9922

Gariep Dam (Afrikaans: Gariepdam), founded as "Oranjekrag", is a settlement in Xhariep District Municipality in the Free State province of South Africa.

Gariep Dam is a town on the northern bank of the Orange River, 50 km west of Bethulie and 48 km north-east of Colesberg. It was laid out in 1965-66 to accommodate the builders of the dam. The previous name is Afrikaans and means "Orange (River) power". The town acquired its current name in 1996.
