= Kopanong Local Municipality =

Coordinates: 30°02′06″S 25°46′46″E

Kopanong
- Local municipality
- Seal

- Location in the Free State
- Country: South Africa
- Province: Free State
- District: Xhariep
- Seat: Trompsburg
- Wards: 8

Government
  - Type: Municipal council
  - Mayor: Xolani Tseletsele

Area
  - Total: 15,645 km^{2} (6,041 sq mi)

Population (2022)
  - Total: 51,832
  - Density: 3.3130/km^{2} (8.5806/sq mi)

Racial makeup (2022)
  - Black African: 69.3%
  - Coloured: 17.4%
  - Indian/Asian: 0.7%
  - White: 12.4%

First languages (2011)
  - Sotho: 37.9%
  - Afrikaans: 34.8%
  - Xhosa: 20.6%
  - Tswana: 2.4%
  - Other: 4.3%
- Time zone: UTC+2 (SAST)
- Municipal code: FS162

Kopanong Municipality (Sotho: Masepala wa Kopanong; Afrikaans: Kopanong Munisipaliteit; Xhosa: uMasipala wase Kopanong) is a local municipality within the Xhariep District Municipality, in the Free State province of South Africa. Kopanong is a Sesotho word meaning "meeting place or where people are invited". The name earmarks unity and seeks to encourage co-operation.

== Main places ==
The 2001 census divided the municipality into the following main places:

Place	Code	Area (km^{2})	Population	Most spoken language
Bethulie	40201	51.80	1,342	Afrikaans
Charlesville	40202	0.33	525	Sotho
Edenburg	40203	28.33	935	Afrikaans
Fauresmith	40204	54.64	1,276	Afrikaans
Ha-Rasebei	40205	11.27	7,203	Sotho
Hydro Park	40206	0.36	586	Afrikaans
Ipopeng	40207	0.75	2,770	Afrikaans
Itumeleng	40208	1.17	3,924	Sotho
Jagersfontein	40209	1.03	1,200	Afrikaans
Lephoi	40211	1.19	5,067	Xhosa
Madikgetla	40212	0.69	3,938	Sotho
Maphodi	40213	0.83	3,592	Xhosa
Oranjekrag	40214	3.82	350	Afrikaans
Philippolis	40215	67.55	1,170	Afrikaans
Poding-Tse-Rolo	40216	0.35	2,411	Xhosa
Qhoweng	40217	0.74	3,469	Sotho
Reddersburg	40218	18.01	967	Afrikaans
Springfontein	40219	40.78	1,753	Afrikaans
Trompsburg	40220	1.27	925	Afrikaans
Waterkloof	40221	20.84	6	Afrikaans
Remainder of the municipality	40210	14,937.34	12,524	Afrikaans

== Politics ==
The municipal council consists of seventeen members elected by mixed-member proportional representation. Nine councillors are elected by first-past-the-post voting in nine wards, while the remaining eight are chosen from party lists so that the total number of party representatives is proportional to the number of votes received.

In the election of 4 November 2026 the African National Congress (ANC) won a majority of ten seats on the council.

The following table shows the results of the 2026 election.

Party	Ward			List			Total seats
Party	Votes	%	Seats	Votes	%	Seats	Total seats
African National Congress	8,467	52.91	8	9,065	59.03	2	10
Democratic Alliance	3,389	21.18	0	3,596	23.42	4	4
Economic Freedom Fighters	899	5.62	0	1,021	6.65	1	1
Independent candidates	1,790	11.18	1				1
Freedom Front Plus	712	4.45	0	742	4.83	1	1
7 other parties	747	4.67	0	933	6.08	0	0
Total	16,004	100.00	9	15,357	100.00	8	17
Valid votes	16,004	97.66		15,357	96.04		
Invalid/blank votes	383	2.34		633	3.96		
Total votes	16,387	100.00		15,990	100.00		
Registered voters/turnout	27,245	60.15		27,245	58.69		

== Financial mismanagement ==
In January 2025, the municipality was listed as one of the top ten municipalities in arrears on their pension contributions.
