= Arthur Goldstuck =

South African journalist, media analyst and commentator

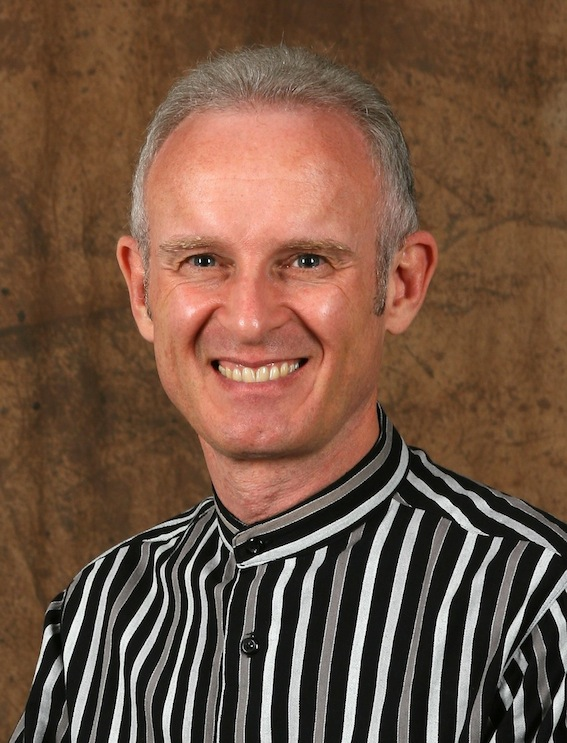
- Arthur Goldstuck, founder of World Wide Worx, author, speaker, and analyst.
- Born: 26 January 1959 (age 67); Trompsburg, Free State, South Africa
- Occupations: Journalist, Researcher, Speaker
- Known for: Internet research, author, Goldstuck on Gadgets, professional speaker, Scrolls of Tanderaa appearances
- Notable work: Hitchhikers Guide to the Internet, Rabbit in the Thorn Tree, Goldstuck on Gadgets, Tech-Savvy Parenting, YouTube series

Arthur Goldstuck (born 1959) is a South African author, journalist, speaker, media analyst and commentator on Information and Communications Technology (ICT), Internet and mobile communications and technologies.

== Life ==
Arthur Goldstuck was born and raised in Trompsburg, Free State, South Africa and resides in Johannesburg, South Africa.

Goldstuck led early research into the size of the Internet user population and the extent of ecommerce in South Africa, which established trend lines for Internet growth in the country.

Today Goldstuck heads the World Wide Worx research organization, and has led research into ICT issues like the impact of IT on small business, the role of mobile technologies in business and government, and the technology challenges of the financial services sector.

Both the International Telecommunication Union (ITU) and Internetworldstats have used World Wide Worx statistics when providing Internet data for South Africa.

Goldstuck established the first benchmarks for web strategy and web site evaluation in South Africa, and leads a team of usability experts that advises on web site usability and strategy. He represented South Africa as a judge for the Interactive category of the Cannes International Advertising Festival in France in June 2002, and as a judge in the online category of the 2003 London International Advertising Festival.

As a journalist, Goldstuck was news editor of the Weekly Mail (now the Mail & Guardian), SA correspondent for Billboard, and a freelance feature writer for the Times of London, among other. He was the winner of the online category in the Telkom ICT Journalist of the Year awards for 2003, and publishes the online consumer technology magazine Gadget.co.za. He is author of 19 books, including South Africa's best-selling IT book, The Hitchhiker's Guide to the Internet, and the seminal work on urban legends in South Africa, The Rabbit in the Thorn-Tree. He has written five other books on South African urban legends.

He has had a number of science fiction short stories published, including "The Fabulous Yesterdays", set in a future Johannesburg, which appeared in the Probe fanzine, Internova: The Magazine of International Science Fiction, and in the South African edition of Playboy. "Streets on Fire: An Urban Fantasy" appeared in Probe and in The Best of South African Science Fiction (1985). "Sphinx Trouble" was published in Playboy and reprinted in The Best of South African Science Fiction, Vol 2 (2007). "Mind Games", a collaboration with Jeff Zerbst, appeared in the Laughing Stock magazine, Probe, and the anthology, Laugh, the Beloved Country: A Compendium of South African Humour, (Double Storey, 2003).

His weekly gadgets column, Goldstuck on Gadgets, is the most widely syndicated technology column in South Africa. He also writes a weekly technology trends column for Business Times in the Sunday Times, South Africa's largest-circulation newspaper.

He talks regularly at corporate events on the technologies that will go mainstream in the next 10 years, and delivers presentations on his analysis of the technology environment at conferences and universities. He provided the closing keynote address for the Microsoft TechEd conference in Durban in August 2009, looking to the communications revolution of the next ten years, and has given talks at both the Consumer Electronics Show in Las Vegas and Mobile World Congress in Barcelona.

In 2013, the Institute of IT Professionals of South Africa presented him with the Distinguished Service in ICT Award, and made him an Honorary Fellow of the institute.

In 2014, the Minister of Communications appointed him to South Africa's National Broadband Advisory Council, on which he served until the end of 2015. He has been an international judge in the GSMA Global Mobile Awards in Barcelona and has judged the Vodacom Journalist of the Year Awards since 2011. In 2019, he was appointed chair of the Sasfin Digital Advisory Council, a think-tank on the future of fintech.

He provides strategic guidance to corporate executives in their use of social media, and offers virtual training to companies worldwide. In 2021, the Southern African Professional Speakers Association named him as the 20th inductee into the Southern African Speakers Hall of Fame. Also in 2021, he was invited to present to the Innovation In Speaking conference hosted by the Professional Speakers Association of The Netherlands, on the topic: 'The Speaker of the Future: How AI will remake you'.

== Published books ==
- The Hitchhiker's Guide to AI (2024)
- Tech-Savvy Parenting (2014)
- The Burglar in the Bin Bag ISBN 978-0-14-302614-3 (2010)
- The Mobile Office ISBN 978-0-7021-7964-8 (2008)
- The Hitchhiker's Guide to Going Mobile ISBN 978-1-77013-113-2 (2007)
- How to Buy a Cellphone in South Africa ISBN 978-1-77013-112-5 (2006) co-written by Steven Ambrose
- The Ghost that Closed Down the Town ISBN 0-14-302505-8 (2006)
- The Hitchhiker's Guide to Going Wireless ISBN 1-77013-034-9 (2005)
- The Aardvark and the Caravan (1998)
- The South African Internet Services Directory (1997)
- Money Talks But Mine Just Says Goodbye (1997)
- The Art of Business on the Internet (1996)
- Never Play Leapfrog with a Unicorn (1996)
- The Hitchhiker's Guide to the Internet: A South African handbook (1995, 1996, 1998)
- Ink in the Porridge (1994)
- The Leopard in the Luggage (1993)
- Going Going Gone (1992) (with Rico Schacherl)
- The Rabbit in the Thorn Tree (1990)
