= Hennie van Zyl =

South African rugby union player (1936–2025)

- Full name: Hendrik Jacobus van Zyl
- Born: 31 January 1936 Ventersdorp, North West, South Africa
- Died: 1 December 2025 (aged 89) South Africa

Rugby union career
- Position: Wing
International career
Years	Team	Apps	(Points)
1960–61	South Africa	10	(18)

Hendrik Jacobus van Zyl (31 January 1936 – 1 December 2025) was a South African rugby union player.

Born on a farm outside of Ventersdorp, van Zyl learnt his rugby while in boarding school. He was a winger known for his long strides and made his provincial debut for Transvaal in 1959.

Van Zyl was capped in 10 Tests for the Springboks, scoring two tries on debut to help them to a win over New Zealand at Ellis Park in 1960. On the 1960–61 tour of Europe, van Zyl played in three of the Tests, before having to return home as his father had been killed in a lightning strike. He scored a hat-trick against Australia in his second last Test match.

In 1962, van Zyl left the Springboks to play rugby league.

Van Zyl died on 1 December 2025, at the age of 89. Until his death, he had been the second-oldest living Springbok, after Frik du Preez.

== See also ==
- List of South Africa national rugby union players
