= Dutch Reformed Church, Bethulie =

Church in Bethulie, South Africa

Coordinates: 30°18′44″S 25°53′24″E

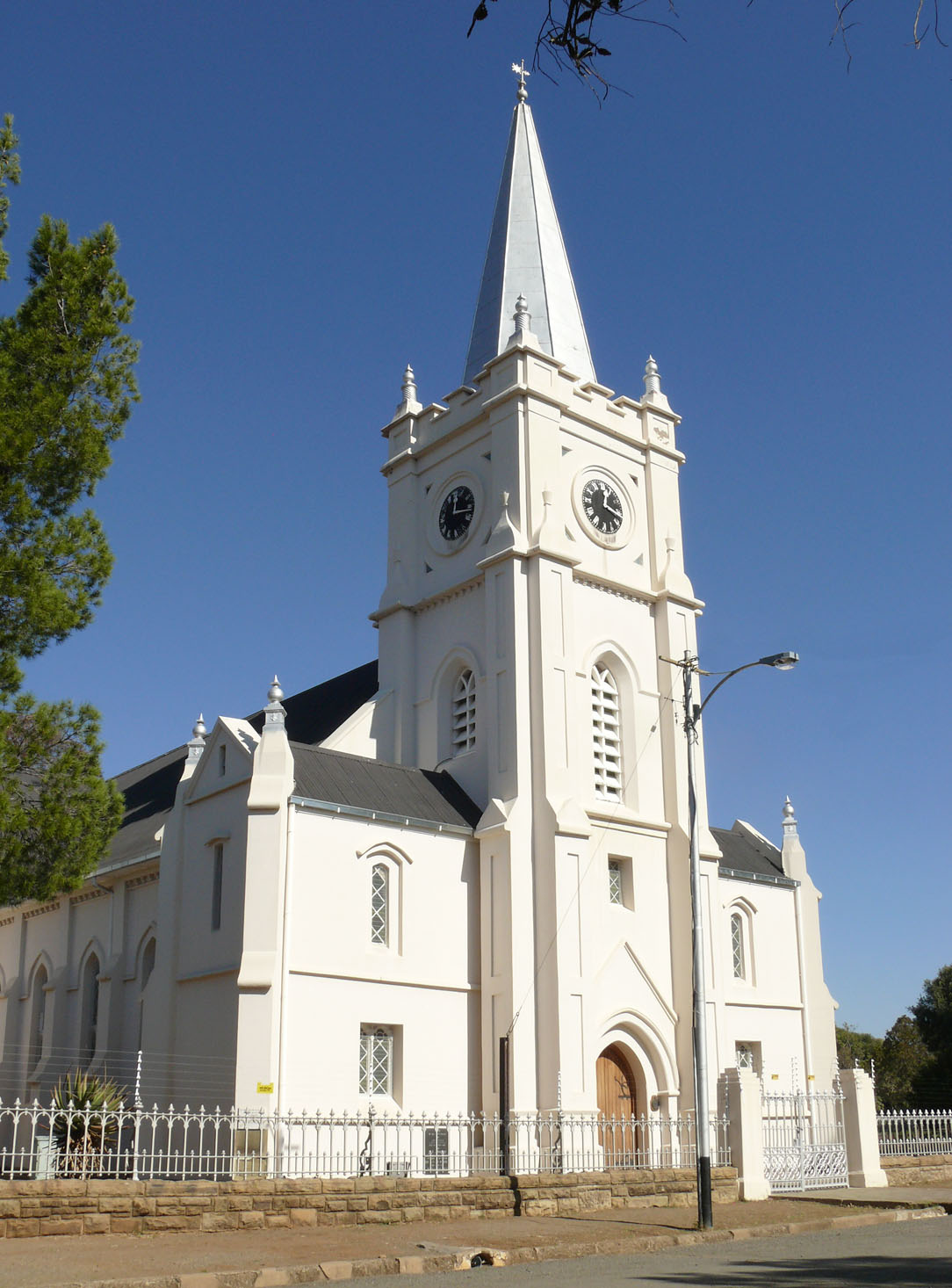
An outside view of the Dutch Reformed Church.

The Dutch Reformed Church in Bethulie is a congregation of the Dutch Reformed Church in the South Free State which was founded in 1862 as the 10th congregation of the Church in the Orange Free State and almost the 85th in the Church. It is located in the Presbytery of Smithfield, together with the parishes of Smithfield, Edenburg, Rouxville, Wepener, Dewetsdorp, Zastron, Reddersburg and Vanstadensrus. In 2015, Bethulie had 479 professing and 137 baptized members and the Presbytery 3,006 and 844 respectively.
