= Reddersburg =

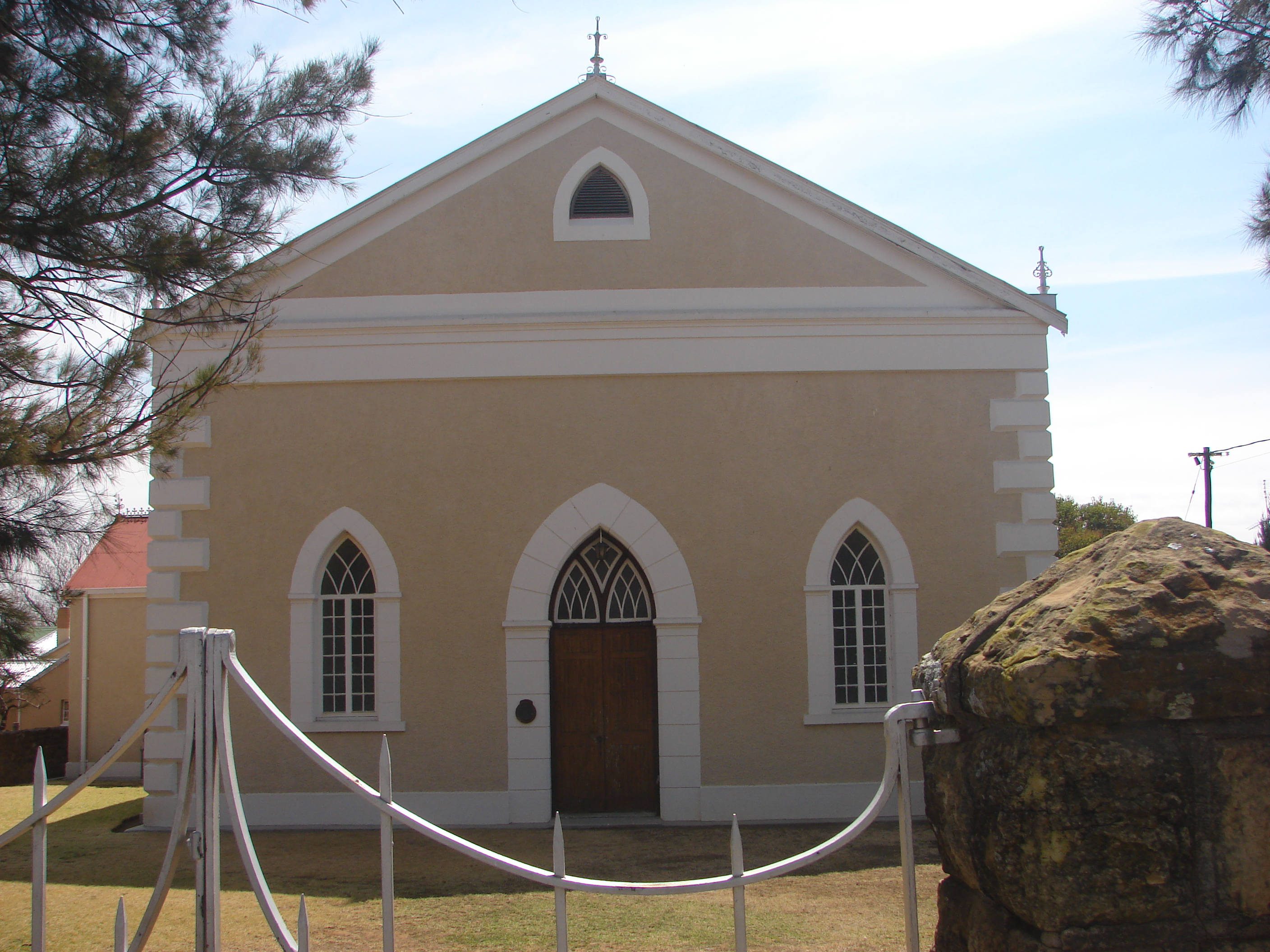
- Old Reformed church in Boshoff Street, Reddersburg

- Location within Free State (South African province) Location within South Africa
- Coordinates: 29°39′S 26°10′E
- Country: South Africa
- Province: Free State
- District: Xhariep
- Municipality: Kopanong
- Established: 1861

Government
  - Type: Municipality
  - Mayor: Xolile Mathwa (ANC)

Area
  - Total: 18.6 km^{2} (7.2 sq mi)

Population (2011)
  - Total: 669
  - Density: 36.0/km^{2} (93.2/sq mi)

Racial makeup (2011)
  - Black African: 17.3%
  - Coloured: 1.9%
  - Indian/Asian: 0.6%
  - White: 79.1%
  - Other: 1.1%

First languages (2011)
  - Afrikaans: 85.2%
  - Sotho: 6.9%
  - Xhosa: 3.2%
  - English: 2.1%
  - Other: 2.6%
- Time zone: UTC+2 (SAST)
- Postal code (street): 9904
- PO box: 9904
- Area code: 051

Reddersburg is a small sheep and cattle farming town in the Free State province of South Africa on the N6 National Route 60 kilometres south of Bloemfontein.

== History ==
The town was established around the Reformed Church Reddersburg, which was established on the farm Thorbeck on 7 May 1859. The church counsel bought the farm Vlakfontein to establish the town. The name is Afrikaans and means "Saviour's Town", from "God is our Saviour". The town was managed by the church until 1894 when it was handed over to the municipality on agreement that a hereditary tenure of 33 pounds sterling must be paid by the municipality to the church on an annual basis.

During the Second Boer War, Reddersburg was the site of one of the last victories for the Boer forces over the British. Troops led by General Christiaan de Wet attacked a convoy of 600 of the Royal Irish Rifles on April 4, 1900, and obtained their surrender the next day.

The Sarie Marais Hotel is one of the landmarks in the town.

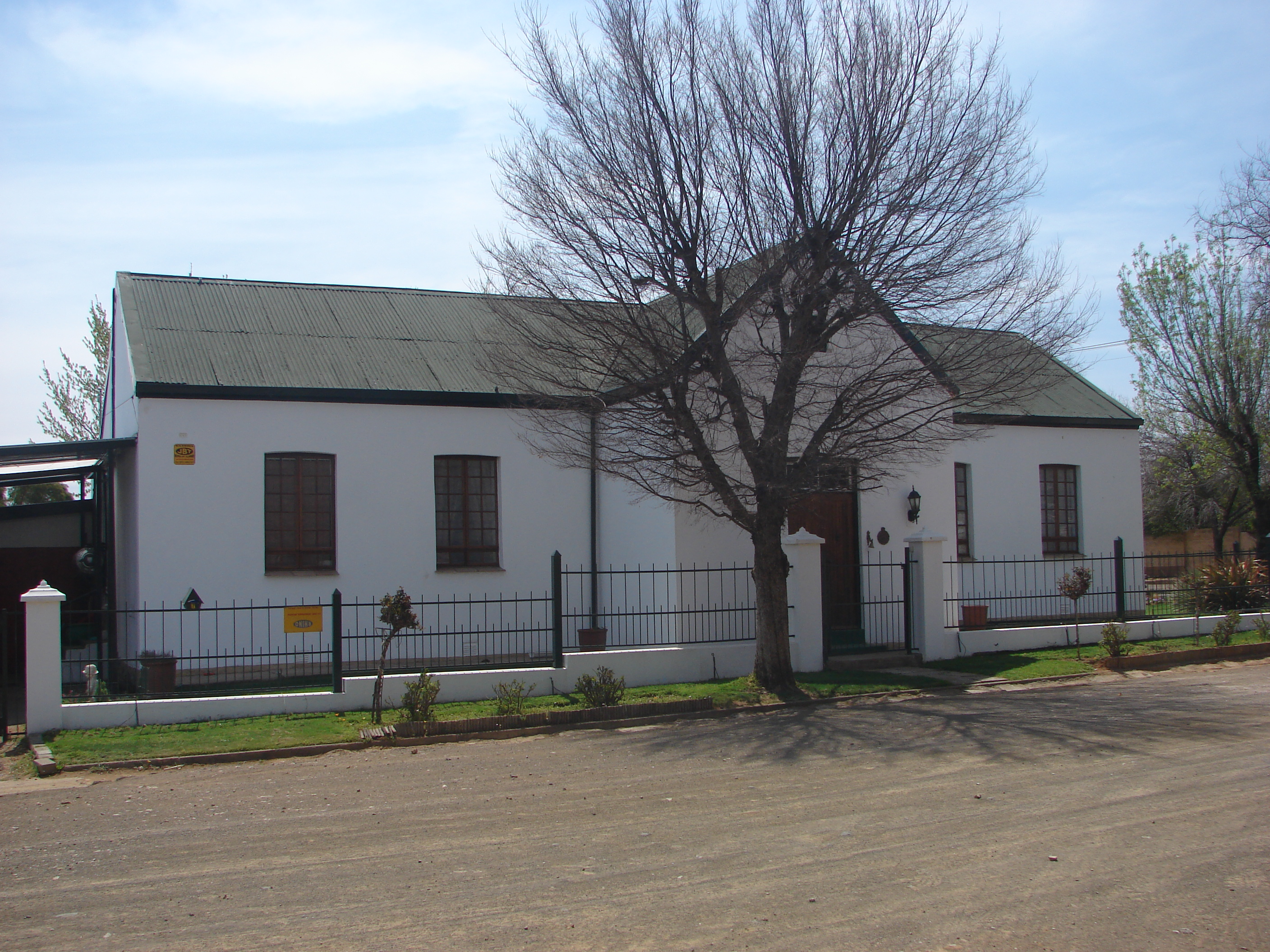
Old CNO school

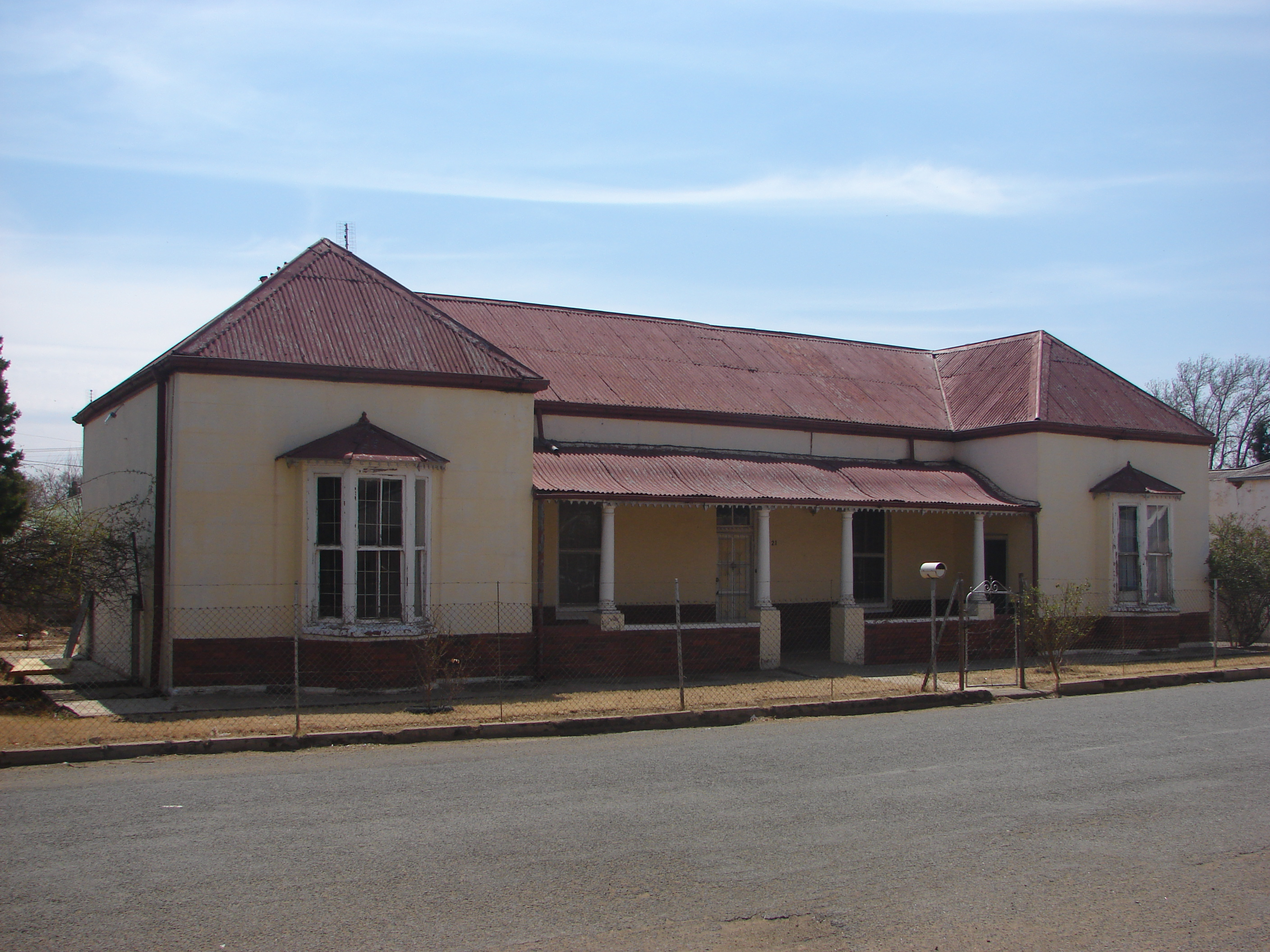
21 Boshof street
