= Edenburg =

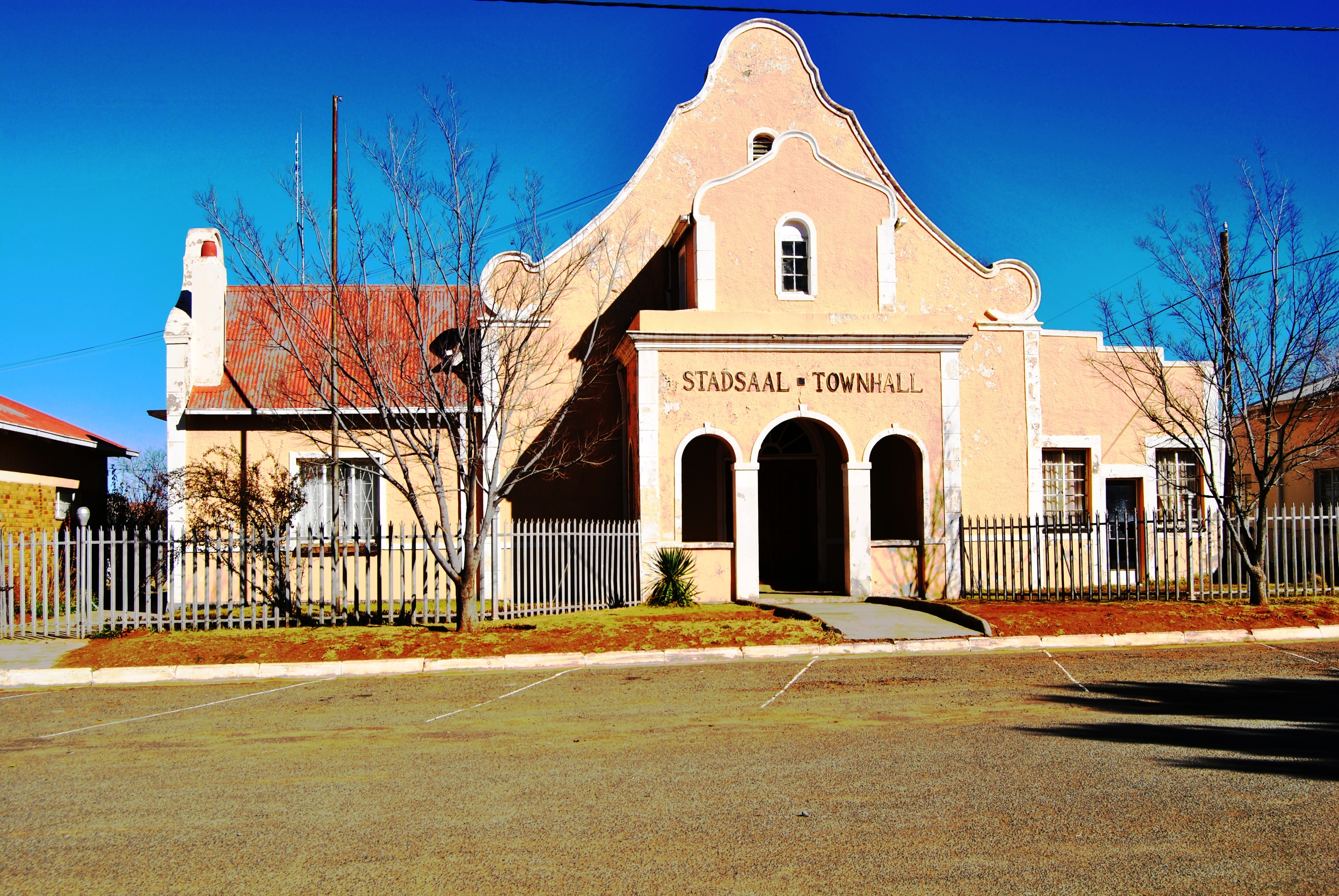
- The Town Hall in Edenburg

- Location within Free State (South African province) Location within South Africa Location within Africa
- Coordinates: 29°44′05″S 25°56′13″E
- Country: South Africa
- Province: Free State
- District: Xhariep
- Municipality: Kopanong
- Established: 1862

Government
  - Type: Municipality
  - Mayor: Xolile Mathwa (ANC)

Area
  - Total: 41.4 km^{2} (16.0 sq mi)

Population (2011)
  - Total: 6,461
  - Density: 156/km^{2} (404/sq mi)

Racial makeup (2011)
  - Black African: 75.8%
  - Coloured: 16.6%
  - Indian/Asian: 0.4%
  - White: 6.8%
  - Other: 0.4%

First languages (2011)
  - Sotho: 53.4%
  - Afrikaans: 26.5%
  - Xhosa: 14.0%
  - Tswana: 2.0%
  - Other: 4.1%
- Time zone: UTC+2 (SAST)
- Postal code (street): 9908
- PO box: 9908
- Area code: 051

Edenburg is a town situated about 80 kilometres (50 mi) south of Bloemfontein in the Free State province of South Africa. As of 2001, it had a population of 14,566.

== Background ==
Edenburg was proclaimed a town in 1863 and received municipal government in 1891.

The town is 85 km south-south-west of Bloemfontein. Laid out on the farm Rietfontein in 1862 with the Dutch Reformed Church built in the same year and it became a municipality in 1891. The name is said to be either of biblical origin or an adaptation of Edinburgh, name of the birthplace in Scotland of the Reverend Andrew Murray, for many years the only minister in the Orange Free State.

The N1 highway bypasses the town to the east, while the Port Elizabeth–Bloemfontein railway runs along its western edge.
