= Bethulie =

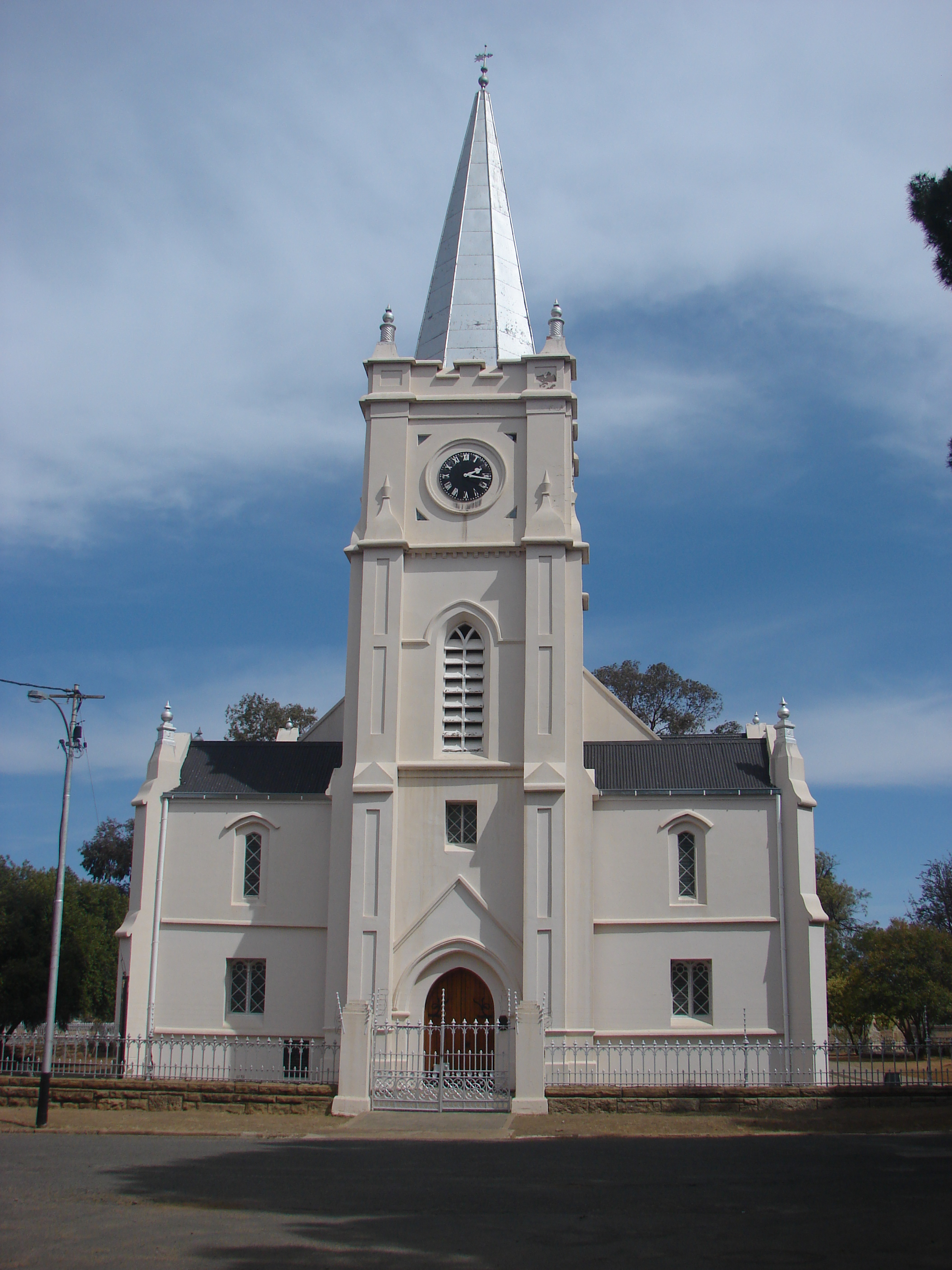
- Nederduitse Gereformeerde Church, Grey Street, Bethulie

- Location within Free State (South African province) Location within South Africa Location within Africa
- Coordinates: 30°28′S 25°58′E
- Country: South Africa
- Province: Free State
- District: Xhariep
- Municipality: Kopanong
- Established: 1863

Government
  - Type: Municipality
  - Mayor: Xolile Mathwa (ANC)

Area
  - Total: 37.0 km^{2} (14.3 sq mi)

Population (2023)
  - Total: 16,000 (approx.)
  - Density: 430/km^{2} (1,100/sq mi)

Racial makeup (2011)
  - Black African: 81.6%
  - Coloured: 9.3%
  - Indian/Asian: 0.7%
  - White: 8.0%
  - Other: 0.4%

First languages (2011)
  - Xhosa: 43.8%
  - Sotho: 31.0%
  - Afrikaans: 18.9%
  - English: 2.7%
  - Other: 3.7%
- Time zone: UTC+2 (SAST)
- Postal code (street): 9992
- PO box: 9992
- Area code: 051

Bethulie is a small sheep and cattle farming town in the Free State province of South Africa. The name meaning chosen by God was given by directors of a mission station in 1829 which the town formed around. The mission building is the oldest settler built building still standing in the Free State. The town was also home to one of the largest concentration camps run by the British during the Boer War. The Dutch Reformed Church was built in 1862.

== History ==
Evidence of life was found to be dated to 250 million years ago in the form of fossils.

The first land dwellers to be active in the Bethulie region were the San people, whose various drawings are still in existence in the area. In 1828 a mission station was established by the London Missionary Society for the local San people called the t'kaut'kou (possibly corruption of ǀXam "!kau!karu" meaning either "Moon people" or "Eland people"). It was originally established in an area known to the San as Xweika (Muddy place) and later known as Groot Moordenaarspoort (Murderer's Pass) after a vicious clash between the Sotho and Griqua tribes.

In 1832 the missionary Jean Pierre Pellissier, whose home is one of the oldest pioneer buildings north of the Orange River, replaced the London missionaries. It now houses a historical museum displaying items of the past and information on the life and trial of Jean Pellissier and Chief Lephoi and his people. Until 1833 Bethulie was known as Caledon (after the nearby Caledon River). This name was in conflict with a Western Cape town bearing the same name. Then in 1833 a French Missionary Society, the "Paris Evangelical Missionary Society" took over control of the area and renamed the mission station Bethulua, meaning "Place of Worship". In 1835 it was renamed Verheullpolis and in 1863 the town was established and renamed Heidelberg. In 1872 the town was again renamed to Bethulie.

During the Anglo-Boer War (1899 to 1902) the third largest concentration camp erected by the British was also situated in Bethulie.

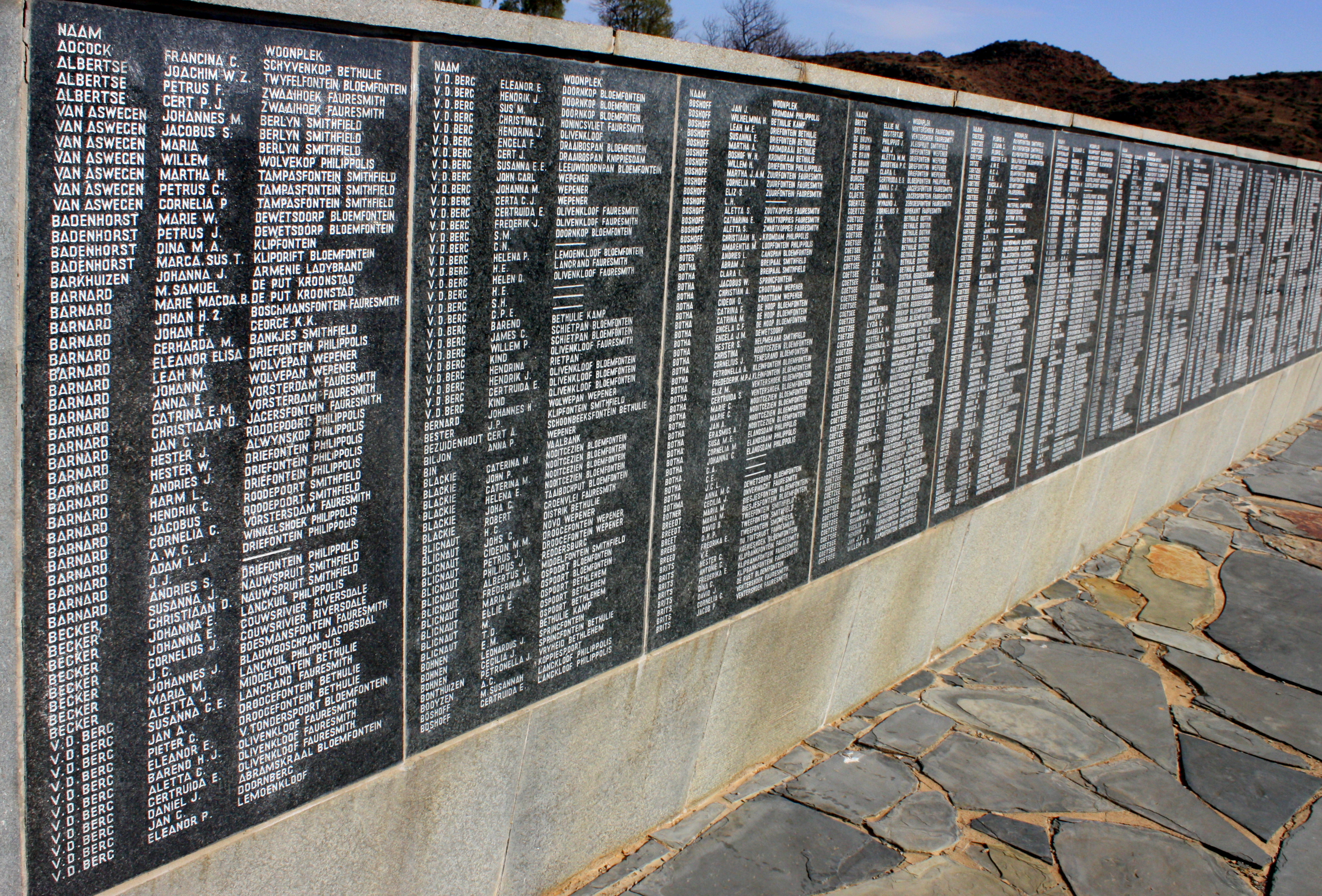
Memorial bearing the names of the women and children who died in the British concentration camp at Bethulie.

=== Timeline ===
- 1777: R.J. Gordon reached the Groot river approximately 10 kilometers from the current Bethulie; he named the river the Oranje river. Mr. Gordon also noted in his drawings of the veldt and his surroundings that he noticed 6 Bushmen.
- 1803: Governor J.W. Janssens traveled to the current location of Bethulie.
- 1809: Colonel R. Collins reached the convergence of both the Caledon and Oranje rivers, he is also credited for the Caledon River's name.
- 1823: G.P.N. Coetsee noted that during his travels in the area he only noticed Bushmen and no other settlements nor indigenous people.
- 1828–1833: Missionary work within the Bushman community was undertaken by J. Clark and G.A. Kolbe.
- 1833–1867: Missionary work within the Tlhaping community was undertaken by J.P. Pellissier.
- 1860–1863: During 1860 farmers bought 6,000 morgen (A morgen was a unit of measurement of land in Germany, the Netherlands and the Dutch colonies, including South Africa) from the Tlhaping to be officially proclaimed a town with the name of Heidelberg.

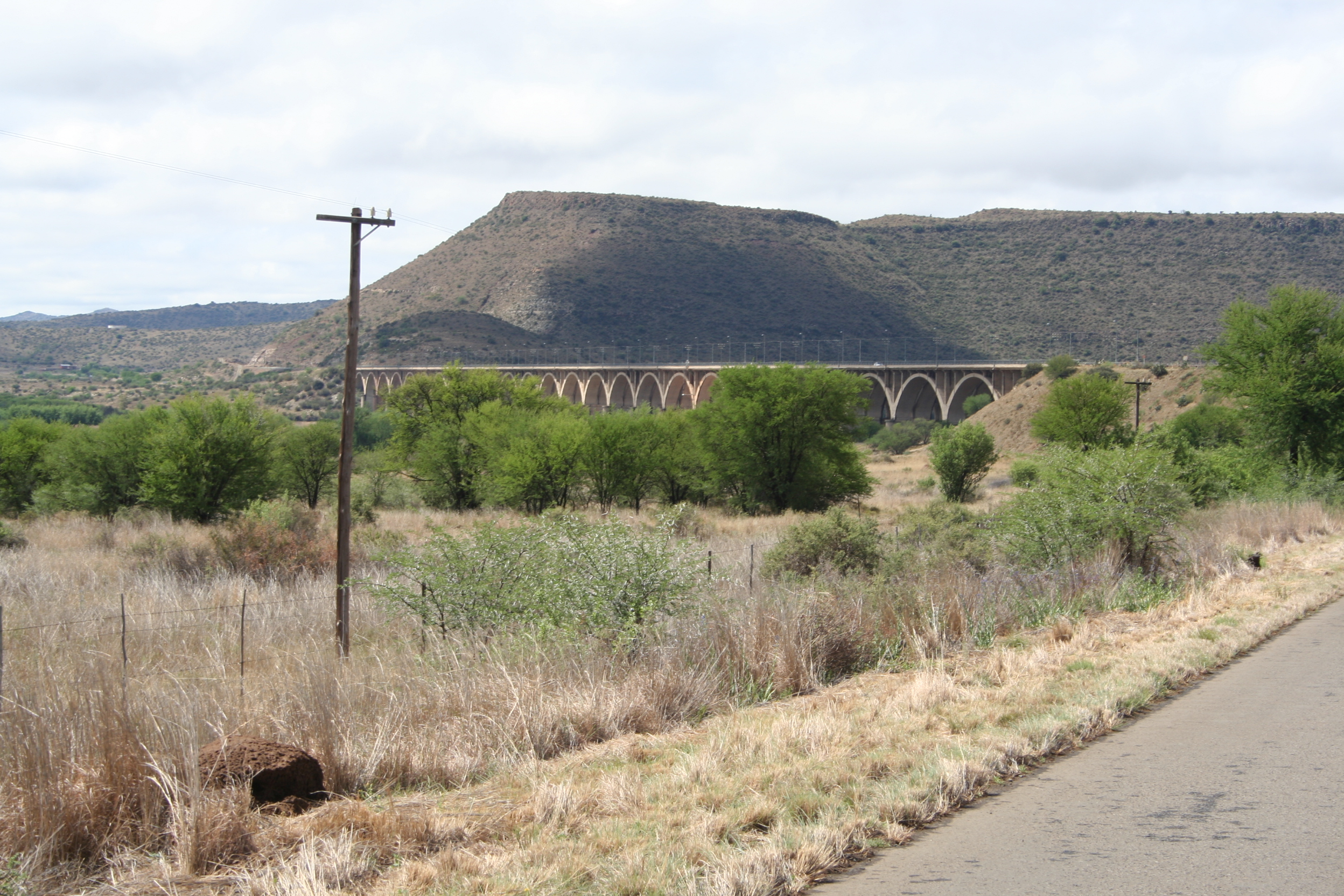
D.H. Steyn Bridge near Bethulie

The D.H. Steyn Bridge or Hennie Steyn Bridge is an arched bridge near the town of Bethulie, it is a combined road and rail bridge which spans the Orange River just outside Bethulie. It is 1,152 m (1,260 yds) long, and 51.5m high and thereby the longest bridge in South Africa. It is also claimed to be the longest in the southern hemisphere. Work started 1899 and completed 1901.

== Notable people ==
Bethulie's most famous son was Patrick Mynhardt, whose one-man shows featuring Herman Charles Bosman's character Oom Schalk Lourens were popular in South Africa. His autobiographical show Boy from Bethulie formed the basis for a book of the same name.
