= Springfontein =

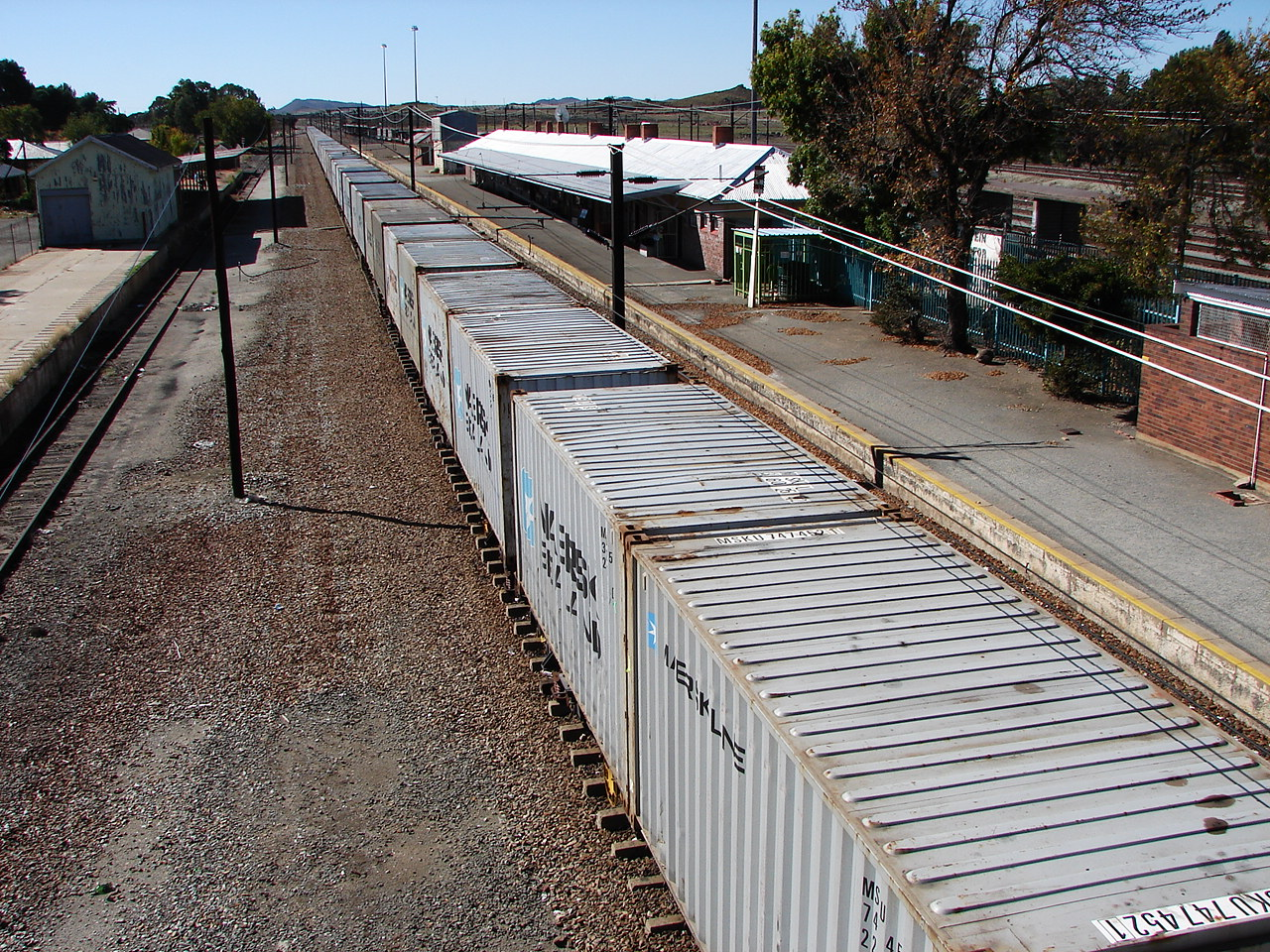
- Springfontein railway station

- Location within Free State (South African province) Location within South Africa
- Coordinates: 30°15′14″S 25°42′14″E
- Country: South Africa
- Province: Free State
- District: Xhariep
- Municipality: Kopanong

Government
  - Type: Municipality

Area
  - Total: 16.5 km^{2} (6.4 sq mi)
- Elevation: 1,515 m (4,970 ft)

Population (2011)
  - Total: 3,699
  - Density: 224/km^{2} (581/sq mi)

Racial makeup (2011)
  - Black African: 75.1%
  - Coloured: 21.1%
  - Indian/Asian: 0.5%
  - White: 3.1%
  - Other: 0.1%

First languages (2011)
  - Xhosa: 41.5%
  - Afrikaans: 28.9%
  - Sotho: 22.8%
  - Tswana: 3.1%
  - Other: 3.8%
- Time zone: UTC+2 (SAST)
- Postal code (street): 9917
- PO box: 9917
- Area code: 051

Springfontein is a small mixed farming town in the southern part of the Free State province of South Africa. It is located 150 km south-west of Bloemfontein.

== History ==
The town was established in 1904 on the farm Hartleydale, which was part of the farm Springfontein. The name Springfontein, which is Afrikaans for "jumping fountain", stems from the existence of a spring on a farm. A village management board was established in 1904 and the town attained municipal status in 1912. Farming with sheep, cattle and maize is prevalent in the district, and in the early part of the twentieth century the Springfontein Creameries were one of the main employers. The town is an important railway junction on the main line to Johannesburg, being the point where the Bloemfontein line converges with the East London and Port Elizabeth lines and where a westward line to other Free State towns commences.

== Anglo-Boer War ==
During the Second Boer War/ Anglo-Boer War, there was a British concentration camp in the district. The camp was started in February 1901, initially with an estimated total of 411 inmates being held there. Today, there are two graveyards around the town, close to each other. William Gostling, who was a magistrate in Philippolis, was appointed superintendent of the camp. The majority of the inmates that arrived at the camp were bywoners, or poor Boer farm labourers. Many arrivals had little clothing, were barefoot and improvised with what little they had. By the end of March the camp in Springfontein took on hundreds more inmates, including a large number of black people, many of whom were from the Thaba’Nchu district. These inmates were placed in a separate camp. It is reported that the mortality rate was extremely high within the blacks’ concentration camp. During this time, Springfontein struggled to secure a steady supply of water. This was due to the British military base camps that were in constant need of water, and who therefore monopolised the dams initially meant for the Springfield Concentration Camp.

The camp was initially built to house only 500 people, but by April 1901 the pressure of the war brought in almost 2000 more people from various military sweeps. This resulted in a shortage of tents for the incoming inmates. As a result, Bethulie camp was established to help ease the pressure experienced by the Springfontein Camp. Five hundred and sixty eight people of all ages are recorded in the Springfontein Grave Register as having died there between April the fourth and the end of 1901. Their graves can be seen in the concentration camp cemetery. During the war the camp was visited by Emily Hobhouse during her investigations of conditions in the camps.

== The Welsh Hospital in Springfontein ==
During the war a number of private initiatives were set up to provide medical infrastructure, most notably by a fund acquired through subscriptions from Welsh citizens. The Welsh Hospital was founded by Professor Alfred W. Hughes, from Corris.

The hospital was initially meant to be stationed in Bloemfontein, but the area was in the grip of a great typhoid outbreak, which was killing the British soldiers stationed there. The hospital was therefore moved to Springfontein, which was also a strategically important railway junction in the southern Free State.

The hospital was opened in May 1900, but by the following month many of the key medical personnel started getting ill with dysentery. This created a challenge for the staff as they were also struggling to contain a typhoid break out from the wounded soldiers they were helping. By July of that year, the Welsh hospital in Springfontein was regarded as the best run military hospital during the war, and orders were given for the hospital to relocate its base to Pretoria. It's approximated that the total number of cases treated at the Welsh Hospital amounted to 1107. The hospital's founder, Hughes, died of typhoid he contracted while working at the hospital.

== Death of a magician ==
In 1930, an unfortunate accident happened when Charles Rowan lost his life during a daredevil magic trick to escape a straight coat. He was run over by a car and died from his injuries.

== See also ==
- Paul Kruger
