= List of municipalities in the Free State =

The Free State province of South Africa is divided, for local government purposes, into one metropolitan municipality (Mangaung) and four district municipalities. The district municipalities are in turn divided into eighteen local municipalities.

In the following map, the district and metropolitan municipalities are labelled in capital letters and shaded in various different colours.

== District and metropolitan municipalities ==
Name	Code	Seat	Area (km^{2})	Population (2016)	Pop. density (per km^{2})
Fezile Dabi District Municipality	DC20	Sasolburg	20,668	494,777	23.9
Lejweleputswa District Municipality	DC18	Welkom	32,287	646,920	20.0
Mangaung Metropolitan Municipality	MAN	Bloemfontein	9,886	787,803	79.7
Thabo Mofutsanyana District Municipality	DC19	Phuthaditjhaba	32,734	779,330	23.8
Xhariep District Municipality	DC16	Trompsburg	34,250	125,884	3.7

== Local government municipalities ==
Name	Code	District	Seat	Area (km^{2})	Population (2016)	Pop. density (per km^{2})
Dihlabeng Local Municipality	FS192	Thabo Mofutsanyana	Bethlehem	4,868	140,044	28.8
Kopanong Local Municipality	FS162	Xhariep	Trompsburg	15,645	49,999	3.2
Letsemeng Local Municipality	FS161	Xhariep	Koffiefontein	9,828	40,044	4.1
Mafube Local Municipality	FS205	Fezile Dabi	Frankfort	3,971	57,574	14.5
Maluti-a-Phofung Local Municipality	FS194	Thabo Mofutsanyana	Phuthaditjhaba	4,338	353,452	81.5
Mangaung Metropolitan Municipality	MAN		Bloemfontein	9,886	787,803	79.7
Mantsopa Local Municipality	FS196	Thabo Mofutsanyana	Ladybrand	4,291	53,525	12.5
Masilonyana Local Municipality	FS181	Lejweleputswa	Theunissen	6,618	62,770	9.5
Matjhabeng Local Municipality	FS184	Lejweleputswa	Welkom	5,690	429,113	75.4
Metsimaholo Local Municipality	FS204	Fezile Dabi	Sasolburg	1,717	163,564	95.3
Mohokare Local Municipality	FS163	Xhariep	Zastron	8,776	35,840	4.1
Moqhaka Local Municipality	FS201	Fezile Dabi	Kroonstad	7,925	154,732	19.5
Nala Local Municipality	FS185	Lejweleputswa	Bothaville	4,129	78,515	19.0
Ngwathe Local Municipality	FS203	Fezile Dabi	Parys	7,055	118,907	16.9
Nketoana Local Municipality	FS193	Thabo Mofutsanyana	Reitz	5,611	64,893	11.6
Phumelela Local Municipality	FS195	Thabo Mofutsanyana	Vrede	8,196	50,054	6.1
Setsoto Local Municipality	FS191	Thabo Mofutsanyana	Ficksburg	5,431	117,362	21.6
Tokologo Local Municipality	FS182	Lejweleputswa	Boshof	9,326	29,149	3.1
Tswelopele Local Municipality	FS183	Lejweleputswa	Bultfontein	6,524	47,373	7.3

== Former municipalities ==
These municipalities have been dissolved since the current system of local government was established in 2000.

Name	Code	Dissolved	Fate
Motheo District Municipality	DC17	18 May 2011	Part became Mangaung Metropolitan Municipality, other parts annexed by Xhariep and Thabo Mofutsanyana District Municipalities
Naledi Local Municipality	FS164	3 August 2016	Annexed by Mangaung Metropolitan Municipality
