= Motheo District Municipality =

Place in South Africa

- Former District municipality
- A map of the Free State showing Motheo (red)
- Coordinates: 29°07′S 26°13′E
- Country: South Africa
- Province: Free State
- Seat: Bloemfontein
- Local municipalities: List: Mangaung; Mantsopa; Naledi

Government
  - Mayor: M. E. Moilwa
  - Manager: Mr G. Ramathebane

Area
  - Total: 13,950.18 km^{2} (5,386.19 sq mi)

Population (2007)
  - Total: 837,379
  - Density: 60.0264/km^{2} (155.468/sq mi)

Racial makeup (2007)
  - Black African: 82.4%
  - White: 12.8%
  - Coloured: 4.7%
  - Indian or Asian: 0.2%

Languages (2001)
  - Sesotho: 53.55%
  - Setswana: 16.57%
  - Afrikaans: 15.32%
  - IsiXhosa: 11.01%
  - English: 1.76%
- Time zone: UTC+2 (SAST)
- District code: DC17
- Website: http://www.motheo.co.za/

Motheo (Sesotho, meaning "foundation" or "cornerstone") was, until the municipal elections of 18 May 2011, a district of the Free State province of South Africa. At the time of the 2011 elections it was disestablished as a consequence of Mangaung Local Municipality being upgraded to a metropolitan municipality.

The Motheo District Municipality Head Office was based in Bloemfontein, which also serves as the capital of the Free State Province.

== Disestablishment ==
The Motheo District was disestablished on 18 May 2011. When this happened, of its three constituent local municipalities, Mangaung was upgraded to become an autonomous metropolitan municipality, Naledi became part of Xhariep, and Mantsopa became part of Thabo Mofutsanyane.

== Geography ==
=== Neighbours ===
Motheo was surrounded by:

- Lejweleputswa District (DC18) to the north
- Thabo Mofutsanyane District (DC19) to the northeast
- The kingdom of Lesotho to the east
- Xhariep District (DC16) to the southwest

=== Local municipalities ===
The district was divided into three local municipalities: Mangaung, Mantsopa, and Naledi.

Of these, Mangaung Local Municipality — now Mangaung Metropolitan Municipality — is the most densely populated; it features the greatest concentration of well-developed infrastructure and services in the Bloemfontein area, which offers a wide range of amenities to the surrounding rural communities. As of 2007, Mangaung Municipality had a population of 752,906 (roughly 90% of Motheo's total population).

Mantsopa Local Municipality, located to the east of Mangaung, is a mixed agricultural area, with a population of 59,028 (7% of the total).

Naledi Local Municipality, located to the southeast of Mangaung, is largely characterized by livestock-oriented farming, and has a population of 25,445 (3% of the total).

=== Settlements ===
In Mangaung Local Municipality:

- Bloemfontein — Motheo's seat and most prominent urban node; also the capital of the Free State province.
- Botshabelo — A typical dormitory town created under apartheid legislation to accommodate future urbanisation of the Basotho people.
- Thaba Nchu — A traditional settlement that serves as a home for the Barolong; it is surrounded by 37 rural villages.

In Mantsopa Local Municipality:

- Tweespruit — A small rural town approximately 35 km east of Thaba Nchu.
- Ladybrand — The most eastern urban area in Motheo.
- Excelsior — A rural town located 35 km north of Tweespruit, along the R709 road.
- Hobhouse — A rural town located 45 km south of Tweespruit, along the R709 road.
- Thaba Patchoa — A rural village planned during the apartheid era as a Coloured settlement.

In Naledi Local Municipality:

- Dewetsdorp — A small town approximately 71 km southeast of Bloemfontein, situated along the R702 road.
- Wepener — A village 35 km southeast of Dewetsdorp, Wepener is the gateway to Mafeteng in Lesotho, with the Van Rooyen Border Gate approximately 7 km away. Wepener is also not far from the Caledon Nature Reserve and the Welbedacht Dam.
- Van Stadensrus — A small rural town approximately 29 km south of Wepener, next to the Egmont Dam.

== Demographics ==
The Black African population group constituted 82.4% of the district's population. Sesotho was the native language of over 50% of the district's residents.

=== Gender ===
As of 2007, 52.3% of the population were female, and 47.7% were male.

=== Age ===
As of 2007, 27.6% of the population were between the age of 0 and 14; 29.6% were between 15 and 29 years old; 21.4% were between 30 and 44 years old; 13.5% were between 45 and 59 years old; 5.9% were between 60 and 74 years old; and 2.0% were 75 or older.
