= Uitkoms =

- Location within Free State (South African province) Location within South Africa
- Coordinates: 30.407°S 26.840°E
- Country: South Africa
- Province: Free State
- District: Xhariep
- Municipality: Mohokare
- Main Place: Rouxville

Area
  - Total: 0.20 km^{2} (0.077 sq mi)

Population (2011)
  - Total: 576
  - Density: 2,900/km^{2} (7,500/sq mi)

Racial makeup (2011)
  - Black African: 70.8%
  - Coloured: 29.0%
  - Indian/Asian: 0.2%

First languages (2011)
  - Sotho: 60.4%
  - Afrikaans: 29.0%
  - Xhosa: 8.3%
  - English: 1.0%
  - Other: 1.2%
- Time zone: UTC+2 (SAST)

Uitkoms is a town in Xhariep District Municipality in the Free State province of South Africa.
