= Lucas Majozi =

Lucas Majozi DCM
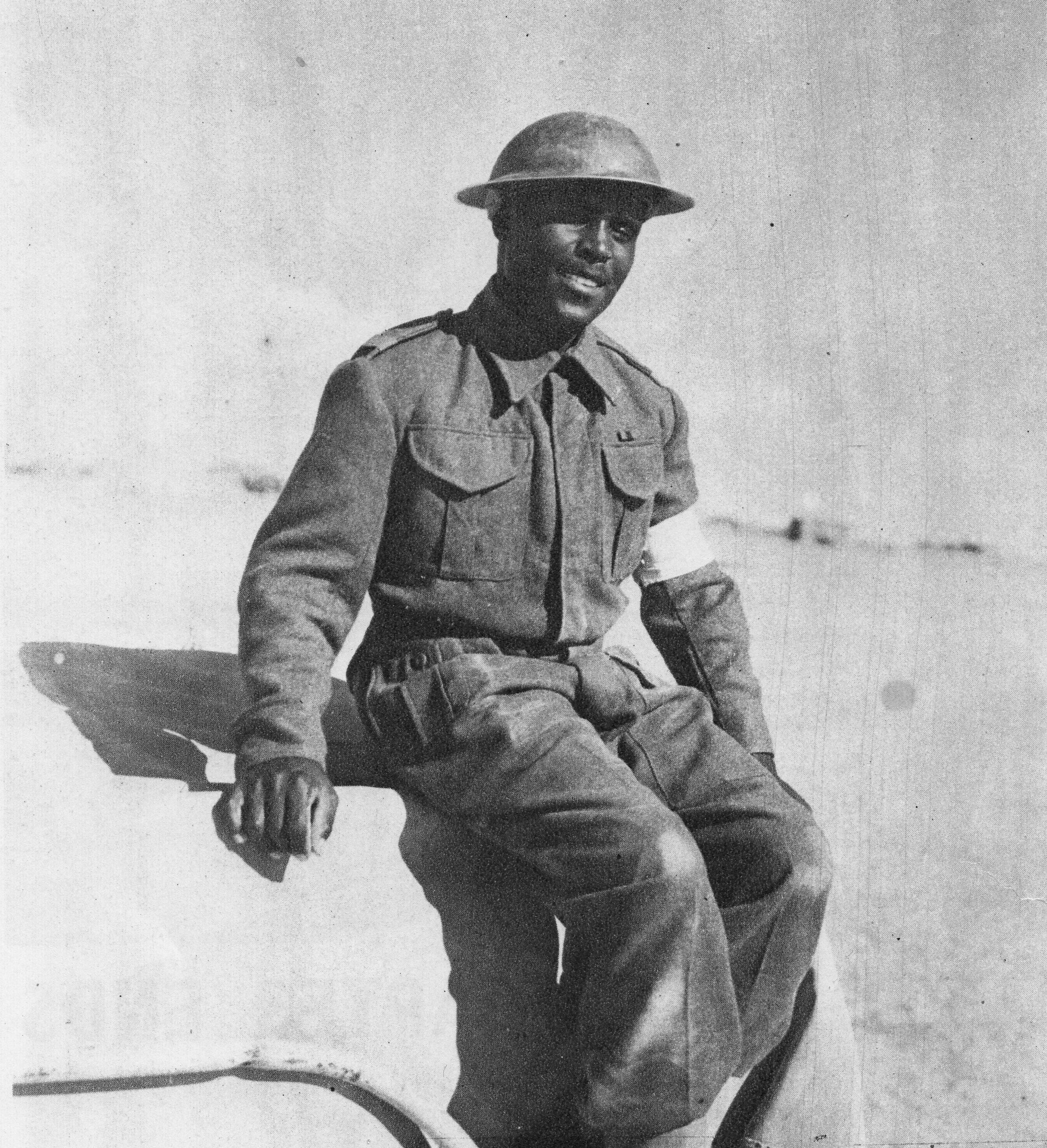
- Born: Lucas Majozi; 1916; Zastron, Orange Free State, Union of South Africa
- Died: 1969 (aged 52–53); Transvaal, South Africa
- Military career
- Allegiance: South Africa
- Branch: 1st / 2nd Field Force
- Rank: Lance Corporal
- Unit: Native Military Corps (NMC)
- Conflicts: World War II El Alamein
- Awards: Distinguished Conduct Medal (DCM)
- Other work: Police Sergeant

Lucas Majozi DCM (1916–1969) was a stretcher-bearer during the Second World War, who received a Distinguished Conduct Medal for his bravery during the Second Battle of El Alamein. This being the highest medal received by a black person during that war, Majozi is one of the few soldiers who were recognised. In some records he is referred to as Lucas Majazi.

== Life as a black soldier ==
Lucas Majozi was born in a small town called Zastron / Matlakeng in the Free State. Little is known about his early life. He served as a South African soldier during World War II, serving in the Native Military Corps (NMC). As a black soldier, he was not allowed to engage in direct combat with the enemy or carry a gun. Army recruits were armed with assegais and knobkerries. Although blacks did not serve as frontline combatants, they were still expected to perform their duties in the actual battle zone. On the participation of black soldiers in the war, Alfred Bitini Xuma - who was the President General of the African National Congress from 1940 to 1949 stated that: "They expect us to fight aeroplanes, tanks and army artillery with knobkerries and assegais. What mockery!" When needed, however, commanders would arm black soldiers. In the battles in North Africa and the Middle East, members of the Native Military Corps were used as batmen, loaders, and guards and the more skilled ones were used as drivers, cooks, carpenters and telephone operators. Upon their discharge, black soldiers received a cash allowance of two pounds, a civilian suit and a gratuity for length of service.

== Second Battle of El Alamein ==
Majozi became famous during the Second Battle of El Alamein which commenced on 23 October 1942 when the British 8th Army under the command of General Bernard Montgomery, attacked the German/Italian forces under the command of Field Marshal Erwin Rommel. Throughout the night of 23 October, stretcher-bearers worked under heavy enemy fire, tending to the wounded and evacuating them from the battlefield. The battalion suffered severe casualties which had to be given urgent medical care. Majozi was instrumental during this battle, carrying wounded soldiers off the battlefield. Working through the night even when he was injured himself; and at some point being the only stretcher bearer still on the field, he continued until he passed out from exhaustion and loss of blood (from when he got wounded by shrapnel).

He and his fellow stretcher-bearers had to go through a minefield under constant enemy mortar and machine gun fire to bring the wounded to safety. At a parade in Egypt after the battle, General Daniel Hermanus Pienaar (known as Dan Pienaar) who was the commander of the First South African Division, said:

This soldier (Lucas Majozi) did most magnificent and brave things. With a number of bullets in his body he returned time after time into a veritable hell of machine gun fire to pull out wounded men. He is a man whom South Africa can well be proud. He is a credit to this country.

== Medals ==
For his bravery, Majozi was awarded the Distinguished Conduct Medal. This was the highest award gained by an African soldier in the Second World War. He was awarded this award for the bravery he displayed during the Second Battle of El Alamein.

On the night of October 23–24, Majozi accompanied his company into action as a stretcher-bearer. In the later stages of the action when he was within 100 yards of the enemy and under heavy fire, he thought nothing of his personal safety and continued to evacuate casualties assisted by co-bearers. He was then wounded by shrapnel, but he continued evacuating the wounded. Told by a medical corporal to go back to the regimental aid post, he replied that there were many wounded men still in the minefield. He went back, and with the assistance of other stretcher-bearers, he brought back more wounded. After his co-bearer had become a casualty, he did not waver, but carried wounded men back alone on his back to the aid post. When he was eventually told by the Company Commander to go back, he smilingly refused and remained on duty, working incessantly till he collapsed next morning through sheer exhaustion, stiffness, and loss of blood. His extreme devotion to duty and gallant conduct under continuous enemy fire throughout the night saved the lives of many wounded men who would otherwise have died through loss of blood or possible further wounds.

== Life after the War ==
After the War, Majozi returned to Zastron. In 1948, he joined the South African Police (SAP), attaining the rank of sergeant. He died in 1969. His medal can be found at the South African National Museum of Military History along with his famous portrait painted by South African war artist Captain Neville Lewis.

== See also ==
- Job Maseko
- 2nd Infantry Division (South Africa)
- World War II
- Distinguished Conduct Medal
