= Rouxville =

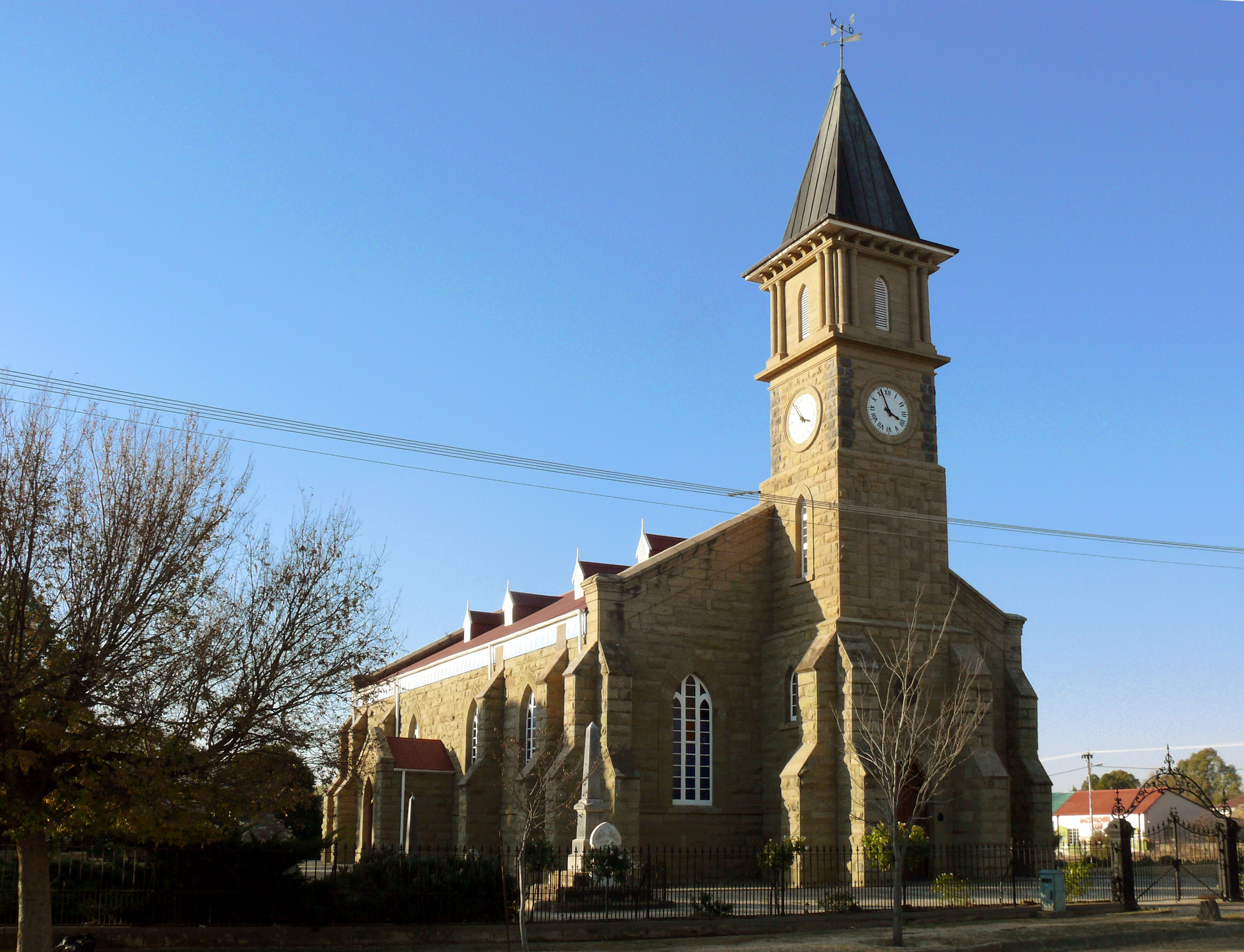
- NG Church in Rouxville

- Location within Free State (South African province) Location within South Africa Location within Africa
- Coordinates: 30°25′S 26°50′E
- Country: South Africa
- Province: Free State
- District: Xhariep
- Municipality: Mohokare
- Established: 1863

Area
  - Total: 16.82 km^{2} (6.49 sq mi)

Population (2011)
  - Total: 780
  - Density: 46/km^{2} (120/sq mi)

Racial makeup (2011)
  - Black African: 61.57%
  - White: 34.7%
  - Coloured: 1.03%
  - Indian/Asian: 0.39%
  - Other: 2.31%

First languages (2011)
  - Afrikaans: 46.1%
  - Sotho: 25.65%
  - Xhosa: 19.06%
  - English: 4.68%
  - Other: 2.3%
- Time zone: UTC+2 (SAST)
- Postal code (street): 9958
- PO box: 9958
- Area code: 051

Rouxville is a small wool and cattle farming town in the Free State province of South Africa and is situated on the N6 national route. The town is at the centre of the wool producing area of the Transgariep.

Rouxville is situated near a number of interesting locations - Zastron (30 km), Aliwal North (34 km), Smithfield (35 km), Gariep Dam (60 km) and Bethulie. Lady Grey, the Witteberg mountain range (with the 2,769 m Avoca peak) and the Drakensberg mountain range are also easily accessible from Rouxville, while the Lesotho border is ca. 70 km away.

== History ==
The town started after mail irregularities at Aliwal North led authorities to re-direct mail between the Cape Colony and the Orange Free State to the farm Zuurbult (founded by Petrus Wepenaar) in 1863. The distance between Smithfield and Aliwal North (70 km) was allegedly too long to be travelled in one day by horse and wagon, and as such Rouxville was created as the halfway stopover.

The town was established in 1864 and named after Dutch Reformed Church Reverend Pieter Roux of the Smithfield parish. Roux traveled throughout the Eastern Free State for many years holding church services for local communities.

During the Second Boer War, all of the town's citizens were called up for military service and the town was completely deserted for two years.

A former State President of the Republic of South Africa, Jacobus Johannes (Jim) Fouché (1898–1980), grew up on the family farm in Rouxville, where he first attended school. He later returned to Rouxville after College and became one of the leading farmers of the region. As a leader of the community in the wider Southeast Free State area, he entered politics when he was elected a member of the South African Parliament on the ticket of the Reunited National Party, representing nearby Smithfield (1941–1950), was appointed Administrator of the Orange Free State (1951–1959), served also as Defence Minister (1959–1965) and Minister of Agricultural technical services and water affairs (1966–1968) in the Governments of Verwoerd and Vorster. He was again elected to Parliament, this time representing Bloemfontein West (1960–1968). He was the second choice as successor to Charles Swart as State President, but was defeated by Theophilus Ebenhaezer Donges, however when Donges failed to assume office because of poor health, he emerged as a compromise candidate and was nominated by the Parliamentary caucus of the National Party as State President and served his entire 7-year term (1968–1975).
