= Lourierpark =

- Location within Free State (South African province) Location within South Africa
- Coordinates: 29.188°S 26.174°E
- Country: South Africa
- Province: Free State
- Municipality: Mangaung
- Main Place: Bloemfontein

Area
  - Total: 2.22 km^{2} (0.86 sq mi)

Population (2011)
  - Total: 3,177
  - Density: 1,430/km^{2} (3,710/sq mi)

Racial makeup (2011)
  - Black African: 91.0%
  - Coloured: 7.8%
  - Indian/Asian: 0.2%
  - White: 0.9%
  - Other: 0.1%

First languages (2011)
  - Sotho: 42.2%
  - English: 15.0%
  - Xhosa: 14.2%
  - Tswana: 11.8%
  - Other: 16.8%
- Time zone: UTC+2 (SAST)

Loerierpark is a suburb of the city of Bloemfontein in South Africa.
