= John Wessels =

John Wessels may refer to:

- John Wessels (judge) (1862–1936), Afrikaner judge of the Appellate Division
- John Wessels (basketball) (1938–1994), American college basketball player
- John Wessels (rugby union) (1935–2006), South African international rugby union player
