= Gregory Nthatisi =

South African politician, anti-apartheid activist and Umkhonto we Sizwe veteran

Councillor Gregory Nthatisi

Executive Mayor of the Mangaung Metropolitan Municipality
- Incumbent
- Assumed office 26 April 2023; Acting: 26 April 2023 – 13 October 2023
- Preceded by: Papi Mokoena

Councillor of the Mangaung Metropolitan Municipality
- Incumbent
- Assumed office 28 March 2023

Personal details
- Party: African National Congress
- Profession: Politician

Gregory Nthatisi is a South African African National Congress politician, anti-apartheid activist and Umkhonto we Sizwe (MK) veteran serving as the mayor of the Mangaung Metropolitan Municipality since 2023.

== Career ==
Nthatsi was a member of the ANC's military wing, Umkhonto we Sizwe (MK) during apartheid. By 2020, he was the secretary-general of the MK Council.

== Mayoral career ==
In January 2023, Nthatisi was one of three candidates nominated by the ANC to replace Mxolisi Siyonzana as mayor of the Mangaung Metropolitan Municipality after the party decided to fire Siyonzana for poor service delivery. In early-March 2023, the National Executive Committee of the African National Congress selected Nthathisi to replace Siyonzana as mayor. He was sworn in as a councillor on 28 March 2023. On 14 April 2023, Nthatisi and the ANC boycotted a council meeting to the elect the metro's new mayor, however, since two expelled ANC councillors attended the meeting, the meeting reached a quorum and Afrikan Alliance of Social Democrats president Papi Mokoena was elected mayor unopposed. The ANC subsequently approached the Bloemfontein High Court which granted the party an urgent interdict that set aside Mokoena's election as mayor.

Nthatisi was then elected as acting mayor on 26 April 2023, receiving 50 out of the 93 votes cast. Nthatisi was elected mayor on 13 October 2023.
