= Bloemside =

- Location within Free State (South African province) Location within South Africa
- Coordinates: 29°09′27″S 26°15′53″E
- Country: South Africa
- Province: Free State
- Municipality: Mangaung
- Main Place: Bloemfontein

Area
  - Total: 1.07 km^{2} (0.41 sq mi)

Population (2011)
  - Total: 6,594
  - Density: 6,160/km^{2} (16,000/sq mi)

Racial makeup (2011)
  - Black African: 88.3%
  - Coloured: 11.2%
  - Indian/Asian: 0.2%
  - Other: 0.3%

First languages (2011)
  - Sotho: 59.8%
  - Afrikaans: 14.4%
  - Xhosa: 11.6%
  - Other: 6.7%
- Time zone: UTC+2 (SAST)
- Postal code (street): 9306
- PO box: 9306

Bloemside is a mostly black suburb of the city of Bloemfontein in South Africa, with a lot of coloured people as well. The area merges with the neighbouring "kasis" (township areas) that are dominated by coloured people.
