= Smithfield, South Africa =

Smithfield
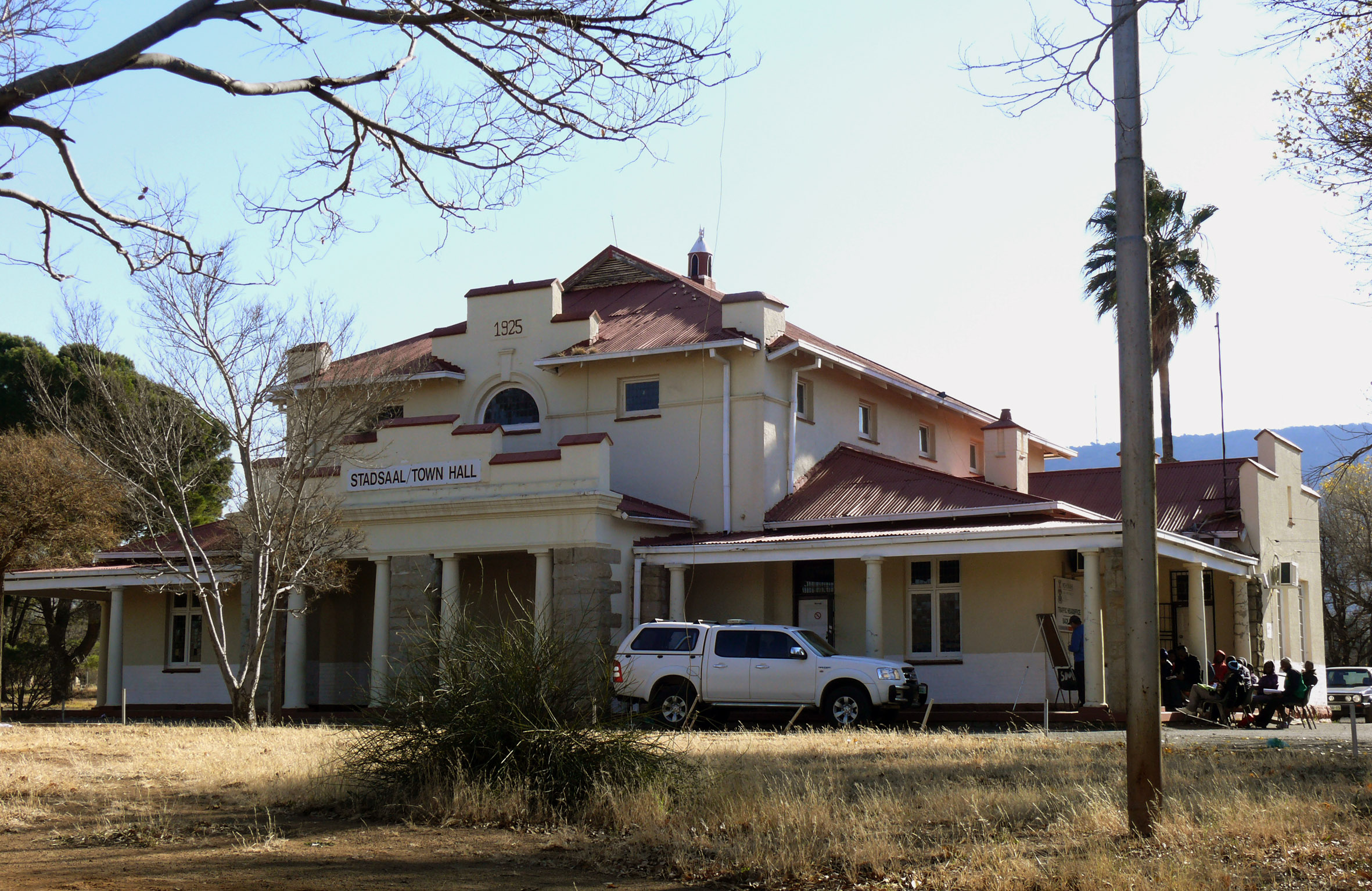
- Smithfield Town Hall

- Location within Free State (South African province) Location within South Africa Location within Africa
- Coordinates: 30°12′45″S 26°31′53″E
- Country: South Africa
- Province: Free State
- District: Xhariep
- Municipality: Mohokare
- Established: 1849

Area
  - Total: 35.5 km^{2} (13.7 sq mi)

Population (2011)
  - Total: 4,779
  - Density: 135/km^{2} (349/sq mi)

Racial makeup (2011)
  - Black African: 91.4%
  - Coloured: 5.0%
  - Indian/Asian: 0.3%
  - White: 3.1%
  - Other: 0.3%

First languages (2011)
  - Sotho: 66.9%
  - Xhosa: 20.9%
  - Afrikaans: 8.4%
  - English: 1.3%
  - Other: 2.4%
- Time zone: UTC+2 (SAST)
- Postal code (street): 9966
- PO box: 9966
- Area code: 051

Smithfield is a small town in the Free State province of South Africa. Founded in 1848 in the Orange River Sovereignty (as the region was then named), the town is situated in a rural farming district and is the third oldest town in present-day Free State, after Philippolis and Winburg.

== History ==
=== Land disputes ===
From the 1830s onwards, numbers of white settlers from the Cape Colony crossed the Orange River and started arriving in the fertile southern part of territory known as the Lower Caledon Valley, in which the commonage of Smithfield would later be established. The Lower Caledon Valley, named after the Caledon River that runs through it, was at that time occupied by herders and their cattle under the authority of the Basotho king Moshoeshoe. In 1845, a treaty was signed between Moshoeshoe and the British colonial authorities headed by the Cape Colony governor Sir Harry Smith. The treaty recognised white occupation in the area, though no boundaries were stipulated.

In early South Africa, European notions of boundaries and private land ownership had no counterparts in African political culture. To the local African chieftains, customary tribute in the form of horses and cattle represented acceptance by the reigning chief of land use under his authority. To both the Boer and the British settlers, the same form of tribute was believed to constitute purchase and permanent ownership of the land under independent authority.

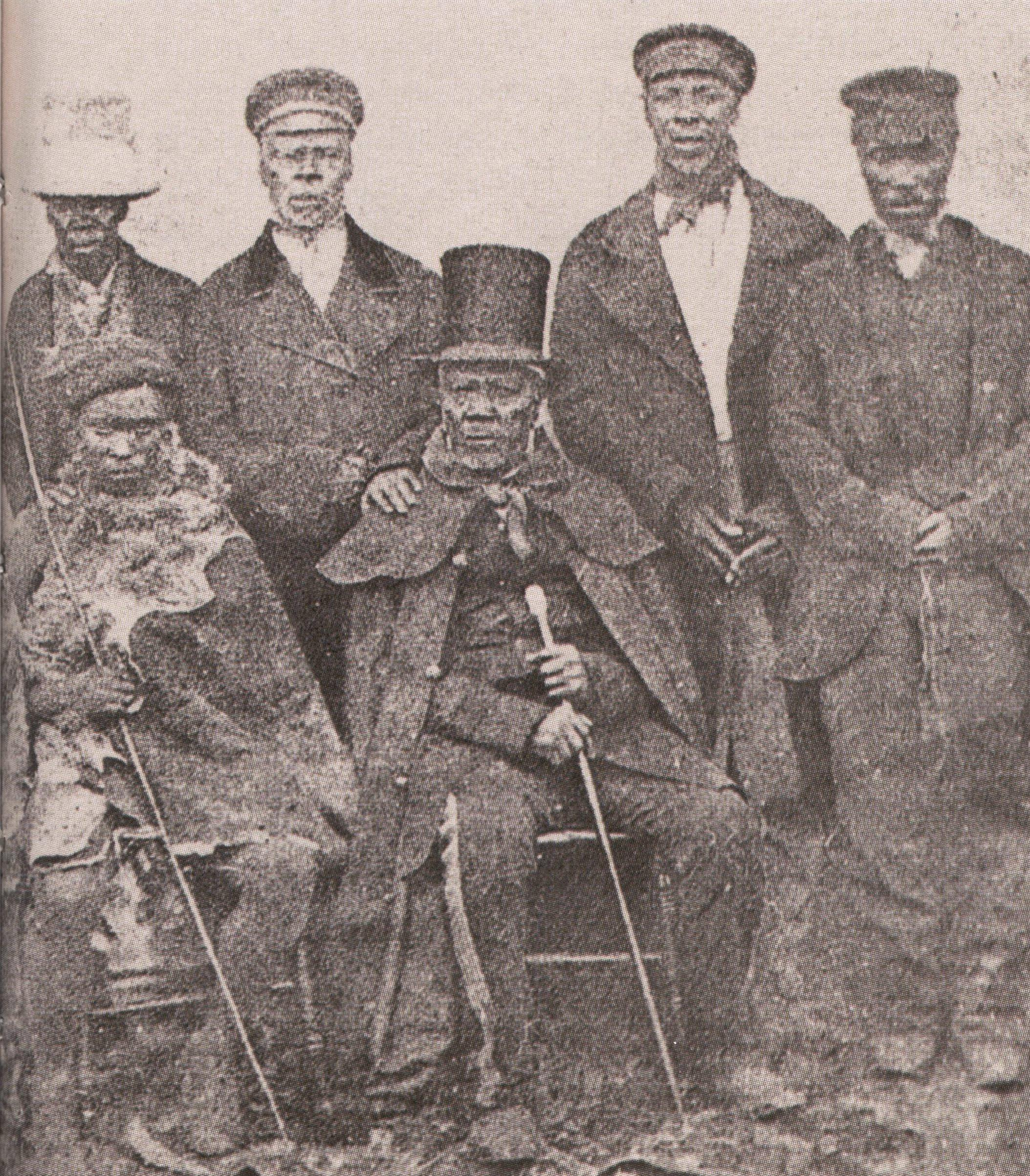
King Moshoeshoe with his advisors

According to historical accounts, Moshoeshoe was under the impression he was authorising temporary grazing land to the settlers, while the settlers believed they had been given permanent land rights. Conflicts ensued. The British, who at that time had taken control of the area between the Orange and Vaal Rivers, which they named the Orange River Sovereignty, decided a discernible boundary was necessary and proclaimed a line known as the Warden Line, which divided the area between British and Basotho territories. Smithfield was placed within the British territory and became the colonial administrative centre of what was named the Caledon District. The Mohokare river, meaning "in the midst" (of Basotho territory), which ran close to Smithfield, was renamed the Caledon river, after the Earl of Caledon, British governor of the Cape Colony from 1807 to 1811.

Although land in the district belonged officially to the British Crown, the British civil commissioner of Smithfield, Charles Halse, made a personal fortune speculating in private land deals. In 1854, the British handed over the territory to the Boer republic of Orange Free State, formalised with the signing of the Orange River Convention.

A succession of wars followed from 1858 to 1868 between the Basotho kingdom and the Boer republic of Orange Free State. Both sides adopted scorched-earth tactics. In particular, the Basotho destroyed farmhouses and burned large swathes of pasturage and cropland in the area between Smithfield and Reddersburg. The Boer commandos, for their part, attacked and destroyed the French Evangelical Mission station at Beersheba, near Smithfield, which the Boers considered to be sympathetic towards the Basotho.

=== Establishment ===
Waterval farm was the original site chosen in 1848 for settlement as a Dutch Reformed (NG) church centre. However, when plots were offered for sale, there were no takers. Farmers were dissatisfied with the site (24 km west of present-day Smithfield). They then opted for Rietpoort, where there was abundant water. The new town was named New Smithfield (the "New" soon fell away), apparently named after Sir Harry Smith, former governor of the Cape Colony (from 1847-1852). In the fifty years after the town was established, the Dutch Reformed Church remained a central point of the town. one of the dominees who served there was Rev Andrew Murray.The Second Boer War General Christiaan de Wet was born on the nearby farm Leeukop in 1854.

Smithfield had a village board in 1860 but only became a municipality in 1948. In the 1870s the town was on one of the main routes to the Diamond Fields from the coast via Aliwal North, and trade was brisk in that period.

In the period 1907 to 1939, the MP for Smithfield was General Hertzog who represented the constituency for the Oranje Unie, the South African Party, the National Party and the United Party. He was the leader of the National Party from 1914 to 1939 and Prime Minister of SA from 1924 to 1929.

On 19 August 1960, Prime Minister HF Verwoerd addressed a conference in Smithfield, where he announced plans to withdraw from the British Commonwealth and to unilaterally declare a Republic. He added that "South Africa is destined to be the country that will provide Whites all over the world with a new source of inspiration." His announcement from Smithfield made international news headlines.

== Geographic setting ==
The town is tucked into a horseshoe of hills, some 132 km southeast of Bloemfontein along the N6 national road to East London, Eastern Cape. The Caledon River bounds Smithfield on the east and south. The district is drained by various tributaries of this river, the Vinkel and Wilgeboom Spruits being the largest. As the town lies 13 km west of the river, water has to be obtained from boreholes around the town dam.

== Demographics and economy ==
Smithfield is part of the impoverished Xhariep district. It has a population of approximately 4,000 black people, and a white population of about 500. The generally run-down condition of the town is contrasted by the comparative prosperity of the surrounding wool-growing and cattle farming district.

== Administration ==
Smithfield is one of three towns within the municipal jurisdiction of Mohokare Local Municipality. As a result of a municipal debt crisis, the municipality is unable to provide satisfactory basic services to its residents. These include sanitation, water, town planning and road repairs.

== Accommodation ==
The town's position astride major tourist routes has lent some impetus to tourism. Smithfield hosts nine guest-houses and bed and breakfast establishments.

== Places of interest ==
The Caledon River museum is located in the town. The Carmel and Beersheba missionary posts are situated nearby. The well-maintained local golf course dates back more than 100 years. Its facilities are open to guests, as are local tennis court and bowls club. Hills surrounding the town are considered well-suited to hiking, horse-riding and bird-watching in relative isolation. Local secondary roads and mountain trails are suitable for mountain biking. Blesbok and some Zebra are to be found in the open savanna Game farms such as Letatsi is also found 25 km outside of Smithfiled, which enhances the experiences of seeing wildlife up close in game drives and also being able to do hunting in the hunting season which is normally between June–August.

== Archaeology ==
The Wilton/Smithfield fossil classification system takes its name in part from the town. Scientist George Stow excavated a cave near Smithfield in 1877 and found tools from the Late Stone Age which he described in his book, Native races of South Africa. Bushman paintings are present in nearby hills.
