= Berry Gazi =

Black South African soldier who served in the Native Military Corps during WWII

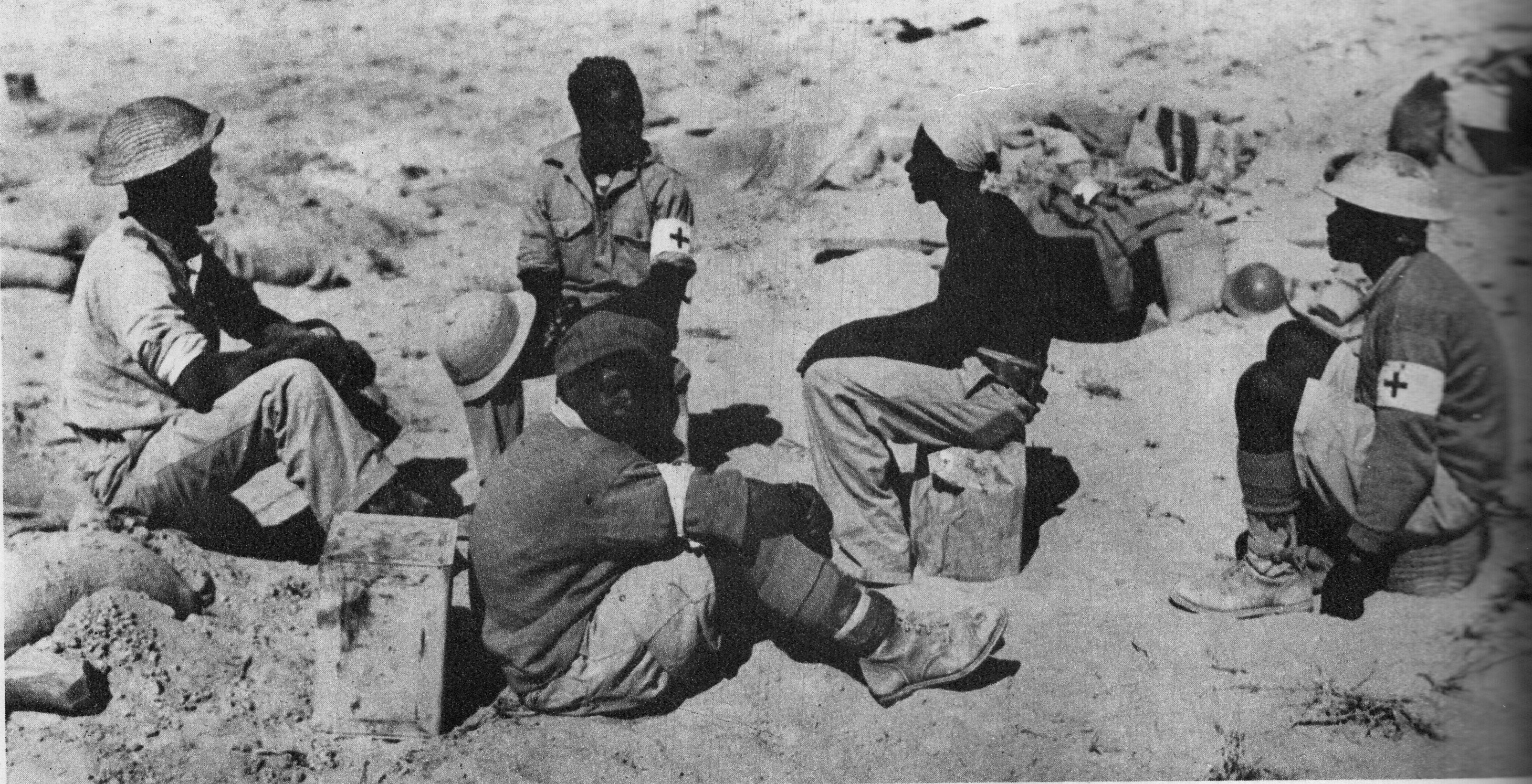
- Native Military Corps stretcher-bearers in the Western Desert in 1941
- Military career
- Allegiance: South Africa
- Branch: Union Defence Force
- Rank: Sergeant
- Service number: N15769
- Unit: Native Military Corps
- Conflicts: Second World War: Western Desert campaign
- Awards: Military Medal

Berry Gazi, MM was a black South African soldier who served in the Native Military Corps (NMC) in the Second World War. Although the racially segregated nature of the South African military notionally prevented black soldiers from serving in combat roles, Gazi participated in the Western Desert campaign as part of the 2nd Infantry Division and was awarded the Military Medal for rescuing wounded under enemy fire at Bardia, Libya on 16 December 1941. He was the first black South African to be awarded this medal.

== Action ==
After the Battle of Bardia, Axis forces had reoccupied the port in April 1941 during Operation Sonnenblume. Further fighting occurred from 31 December 1941 to 2 January 1942, during which the 2nd South African Division were tasked to re-capture the port of Bardia. The Durban Light Infantry were to attack the perimeter in the north-west as part of Northforce (Brigade) attack on 16 December 1941. By 3:45pm the battalion attack had been stopped due to heavy machine-gun and artillery fire, but they were instructed to renew the attack again the following morning. The second attack was launched at 11:00 the next morning but was again halted by German 20 mm Flak guns employed in direct fire role on the South Africans, with many wounded laying on the battlefield under ongoing fire from both Axis and South African forces.

A volunteer was called for; to go onto the battlefield under a Red-Cross flag and to approach the enemy lines with a letter requesting a temporary truce, to permit both sides to remove their wounded from the battlefield. Berry Gazi, then a corporal, volunteered to go and describes the events as:

...I proceeded towards the enemy under very heavy enemy fire, shells were bursting around me and bullets were whining over my head. I cannot say what my feelings were at that moment. I somehow felt an inner urge to go forward and perform my task even though I might have been killed. I managed to reach the enemy without being wounded and delivered the message. I returned safely to our lines.

Despite him having been wounded in the leg returning from the delivery of the letter, he was instructed to retreat to the rear to the closest field hospital to have his wounds attended to. Gazi showed complete disregard for his personal safety and wellbeing and returned to the battlefield to collect and evacuate wounded. For these actions, he was awarded the Military Medal, becoming the first black South African to have been awarded this decoration. The award was gazetted on 3 March 1942.

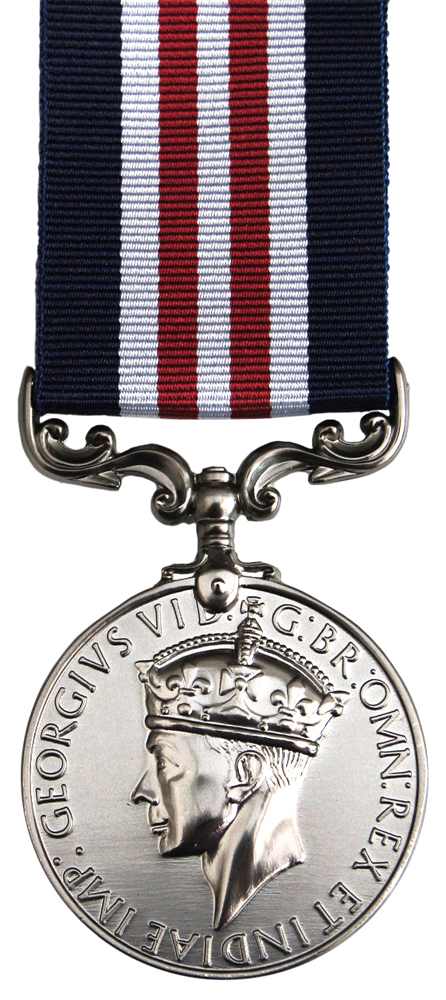
Military Medal as awarded to Berry Gazi

On 1 January 1942, during battles being fought along the Bardia-Tobruk road, Gazi again displayed great courage by taking forward a party to pick up Durban Light Infantry A-Company wounded. Lance Corporal A.G. Girardeau (one of the wounded but who was already deceased) had a grenade with the pin drawn in his hand. As the rescuers tended him, the grenade detonated wounding Gazi and four of the stretcher bearers. Although wounded in four places, Gazi continued working, using a German collapsable boat paddle as a crutch and was only evacuated two days later.

== After the war ==
Gazi was profiled on the front page of The World in 1960 in a photograph that depicted him as old and dejected. The caption described Gazi as a "hero of World War II", and declared him to be the first member of the Native Military Corps to have won the Military Medal for bravery during the course of his work as a stretcher-bearer. At that time he had been forgotten and was penniless.

== Notes and references ==
=== Bibliography ===
- Orpen, Neil (1971). War in the Desert. South African Forces World War II: Volume III. Cape Town: Purnell. ISBN 0360001513.
