= Princess Adelaide of Schleswig-Holstein-Sonderburg-Glücksburg =

- Princess of Solms-Baruth
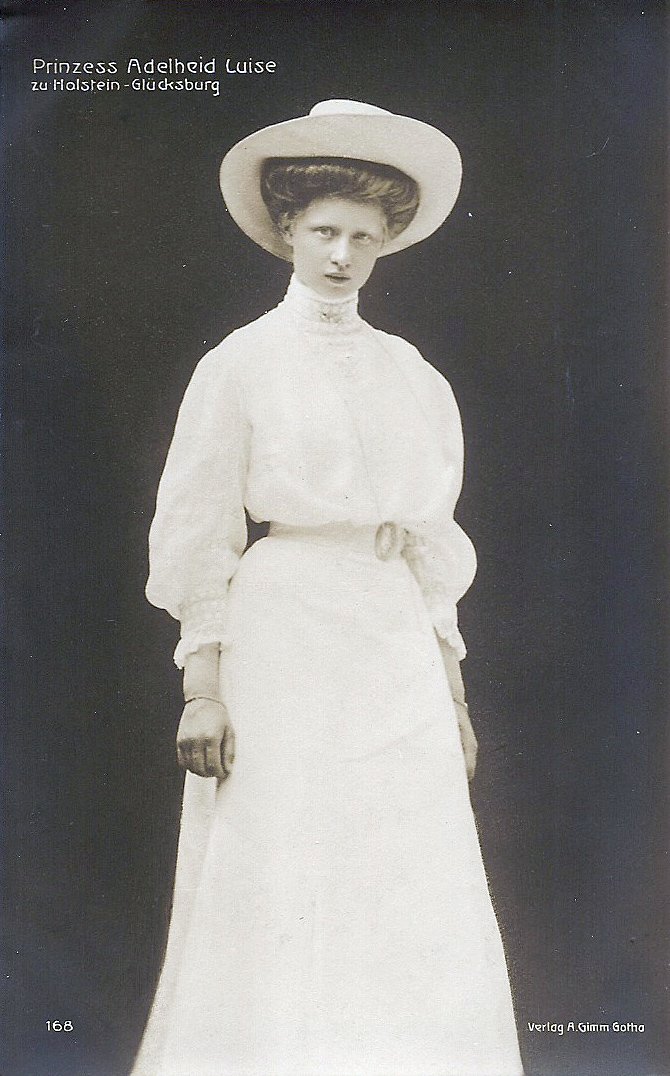
- Adelaide, 1908
- Born: 19 October 1889; Grünholz, Province of Schleswig-Holstein, Kingdom of Prussia, German Empire
- Died: 11 June 1964 (aged 74); Salzburg, Salzburg, Austria
- Spouse: Friedrich, 3rd Prince of Solms-Baruth (m. 1914)
- Issue: Countess Friederike Luise; Feodore, Princess of Aursperg; Countess Rosa; Friedrich, 4th Prince of Solms-Baruth; Countess Caroline Mathilde
Names
- Adelaide Louise; German: Adelheid Luise
- House: Glücksburg
- Father: Friedrich Ferdinand, Duke of Schleswig-Holstein
- Mother: Princess Karoline Mathilde of Schleswig-Holstein-Sonderburg-Augustenburg

Princess Adelaide Louise of Schleswig-Holstein-Sonderburg-Glücksburg (German: Adelheid Luise; 19 October 1889 – 11 June 1964) was a daughter of Friedrich Ferdinand, Duke of Schleswig-Holstein and his wife Princess Karoline Mathilde of Schleswig-Holstein-Sonderburg-Augustenburg.

She was the Princess consort of Solms-Baruth through her marriage to Friedrich, 3rd Prince of Solms-Baruth.

== Early life ==
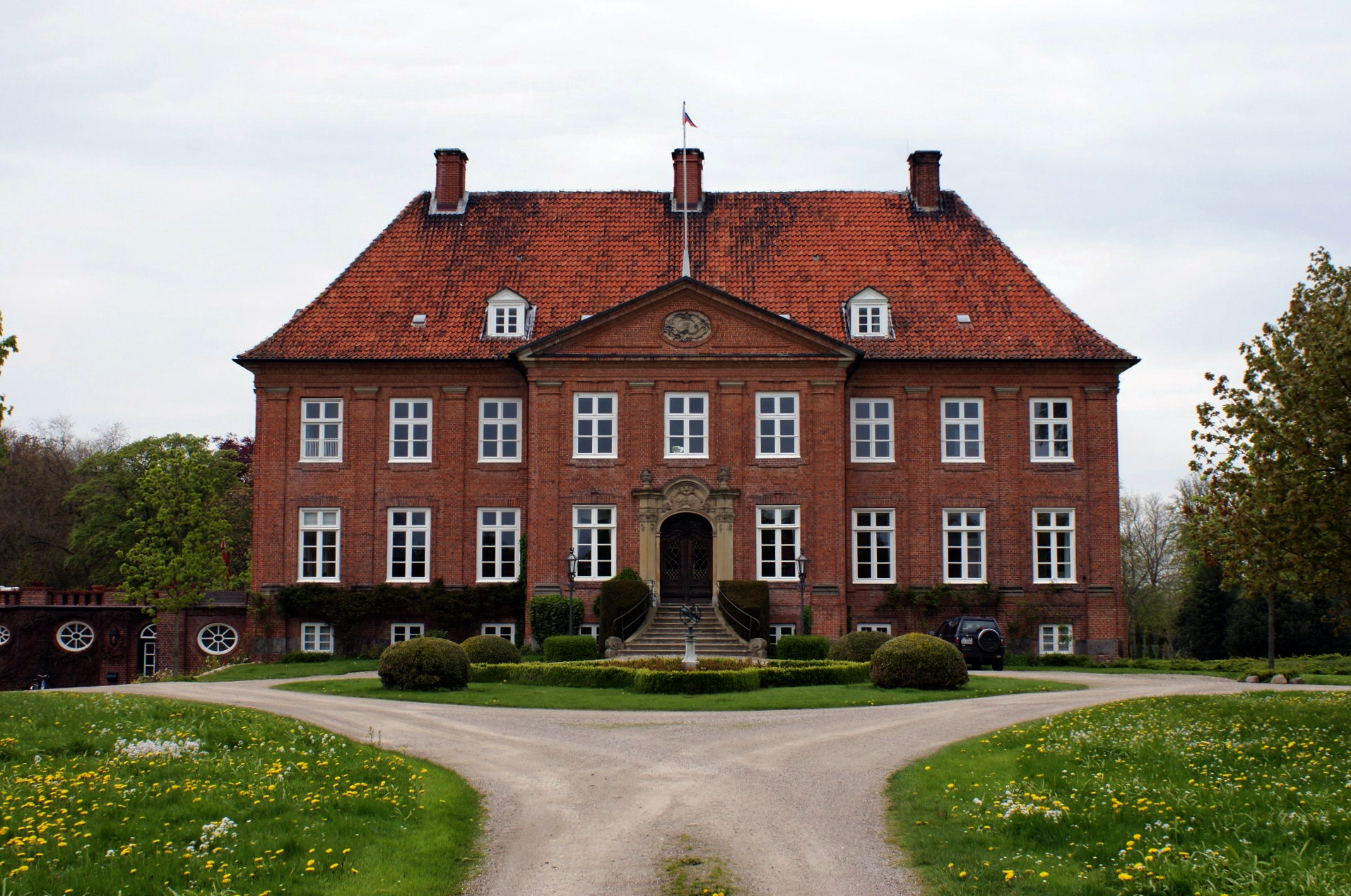
Princess Adelaide's birth place: Grünholz Manor, Schleswig-Holstein, residence of the Ducal line of the House of Oldenburg, photographed in 2010.

Princess Adelaide was born on 19 October 1889 at Grünholz Manor in Schleswig-Holstein, Prussia as the fourth eldest daughter of Frederick Ferdinand, Duke of Schleswig-Holstein-Sonderbug-Glücksburg and his wife Princess Karoline Mathilde of Schleswig-Holstein-Sonderburg-Augustenburg. Adelaide's father was the eldest son of Friedrich, Duke of Schleswig-Holstein-Sonderburg-Glücksburg and a nephew of Christian IX of Denmark. Four years before the birth of Adelaide, he had succeeded to the headship of the House of Schleswig-Holstein-Sonderburg-Glücksburg and the title of duke upon the death of his father in 1885. Adelaide's mother was the younger sister of the German Empress.

== Marriage ==
Adelaide married Friedrich, Hereditary Prince of Solms-Baruth (later Friedrich, 3rd Prince of Solms-Baruth), second child and eldest son of Friedrich II, Prince of Solms-Baruth and his wife, Countess Luise of Hochberg-Pless on 1 August 1914 at Potsdam, Brandenburg, Prussia. Solms-Baruth was one of the many minor states of the Holy Roman Empire, located in Lower Lusatia. It had lost its independence in the German Mediatization of 1806.

Adelaide and Friedrich had five children.

== Later life ==
On 31 December 1920, Hereditary Prince Friedrich's father died, and Friedrich became head of the house of Solms-Baruth.

Prince Friedrich died on 12 September 1951 in Windhoek, Namibia. Princess Adelaide died on 11 June 1964 in Salzburg, Salzburg, Austria.

== Issue ==
- Countess Friederike Luise of Solms-Baruth (10 October 1916 – 10 January 1989)
- Countess Feodore of Solms-Baruth (5 April 1920 – 2006)

∞ Gert Schenk on 23 November 1942, widowed
- Sebastian Schenk (born 27 August 1946)
- Christian Schenk (born 18 August 1953)
∞ Karl-Adolf, 10th Prince von Auersperg (great-grandson of Prince Adolf of Auersperg) on 6 October 1961 at Vienna, Austria
- Princess Caroline Mathilde Adelheid Gobertina von Auersperg (born 24 May 1962) ∞ Christoph Preiser on 19 May 1985 at Vienna, Austria

- Countess Rosa Cecilie Karoline-Mathilde Irene Sibylla Anna of Solms-Baruth ( 15 May 1925 - Oct 2008)

∞ Neville Lewis on 3 November 1955 at Stellenbosch, South Africa, widowed
- Caroline Isabelle Lewis (born 31 August 1956)
- Frederick Henry Lewis (born 23 November 1961)
∞ Heinrich Weber on 9 October 1981 at Stellenbosch, South Africa

- Friedrich, 4th Prince of Solms-Baruth (22 December 1926 – 2006)

∞ Baroness Birgitta of Berchem-Königsfeld on 17 August 1963 at Dabib, South West Africa
- Friedrich, 5th Prince of Solms-Baruth (born 27 November 1963)
- Count Julian of Solms-Baruth (born 6 August 1965)

- Countess Caroline Mathilde of Solms-Baruth (15 April 1929 – 21 January 2016)

∞ Johann van Steenderen on 12 May 1963

== Ancestry ==
Ancestors of Princess Adelaide of Schleswig-Holstein-Sonderburg-Glücksburg

8. Friedrich Wilhelm, Duke of Schleswig-Holstein-Sonderburg-Glücksburg
4. Friedrich, Duke of Schleswig-Holstein-Sonderburg-Glücksburg
9. Princess Louise Caroline of Hesse-Kassel
2. Friedrich Ferdinand, Duke of Schleswig-Holstein
10. George William, Prince of Schaumburg-Lippe
5. Princess Adelheid of Schaumburg-Lippe
11. Princess Ida of Waldeck and Pyrmont
1. Princess Adelaide of Schleswig-Holstein-Sonderburg-Glücksburg
12. Christian August II, Duke of Schleswig-Holstein-Sonderburg-Augustenburg
6. Frederick VIII, Duke of Schleswig-Holstein
13. Countess Louise Sophie Danneskiold-Samsøe
3. Princess Karoline Mathilde of Schleswig-Holstein-Sonderburg-Augustenburg
14. Ernst I, Prince of Hohenlohe-Langenburg
7. Princess Adelheid of Hohenlohe-Langenburg
15. Princess Feodora of Leiningen

Princess Adelaide of Schleswig-Holstein-Sonderburg-Glücksburg House of Schleswig-Holstein-Sonderburg-Glücksburg Cadet branch of the House of Oldenburg Born: 19 October 1889 Died: 11 June 1964
Titles in pretence
Preceded by Luise of Hochberg	Princess consort of Solms-Baruth; 31 December 1920 – 12 September 1951	Succeeded by Birgitta of Berchem-Königsfeld
