= Olly Mlamleli =

South African politician

The Honourable Olly Mlamleli Councillor

Mayor of the Mangaung Metropolitan Municipality
- In office 18 August 2016 – 14 August 2020
- Deputy: Lebohang Masoetsa
- Preceded by: Thabo Manyoni
- Succeeded by: Lebohang Masoetsa (acting); Mxolisi Siyonzana

Free State MEC for Cooperative Governance, Traditional Affairs and Human Settlements
- In office February 2012 – 18 August 2016
- Premier: Ace Magashule
- Preceded by: Mamiki Qabathe
- Succeeded by: Limakatso Mahasa

Personal details
- Party: African National Congress
- Profession: Educator; Politician

Sarah Matawana "Olly" Mlamleli (born 1957) is a South African politician who served as the mayor of the Mangaung Metropolitan Municipality from August 2016 until August 2020. A member of the African National Congress, she served as the Member of the Executive Council (MEC) for Cooperative Governance, Traditional Affairs and Human Settlements from February 2012 to August 2016. In 2020, Mlamleli was ousted as Mayor of Mangaung and arrested over a controversial asbestos contract stemming from her time with the MEC.

== Early life and career ==
Mlamleli was born in 1957 in Viljoenskroon in the Orange Free State Province. She studied at the Mphohadi College where she obtained a teaching degree in 1976. She proceeded to work as a teacher and was later appointed a school principal. She obtained a Bachelor of Arts, a Bachelors in Education and a master's degree in education focusing on the education models of the United States and Japan. In 1996, she was employed as a manager in the Free State Department of Education. She was selected as a director in the Office on the Status of Women in 2001. Premier Beatrice Marshoff appointed her as a coordinator of the Municipal Infrastructure Grants.

== Political career ==
Mlamleli was elected as a Member of the Free State Provincial Legislature in 2009. The legislature designated her as the chairperson of the corporate governance, traditional affairs and human settlements portfolio committee. In 2012, premier Ace Magashule appointed her as the MEC for that specific portfolio, succeeding Mamiki Qabathe. She remained in the position following the 2014 general election.

Mlamleli has served as the African National Congress Women's League provincial chairperson. She is described as someone who is aligned to ANC secretary-general and former premier Magashule.

=== Mayoralty ===
Mlamleli was selected as the ANC's mayoral candidate for the Mangaung Metropolitan Municipality. The ANC retained their majority in council in the August 2016 municipal election. Consequently, she was elected mayor when the council reconvened on 18 August. She became the city's first female mayor. An inauguration ceremony was held for her in September. Mlamleli was appointed SALGA provincial chairperson in November 2016.

During her mayoralty, the rating agency Moody's downgraded the municipality to B3 in August 2019, citing that the municipality's service delivery could collapse if there was no immediate intervention. It was downgraded again to Caa1 in January 2020 over concerns of poor liquidity. The regional ANC called for removal, yet the provincial structure defended her.

The provincial government placed the municipality under administration in December 2019. Mlamleli had survived two motions of no-confidence. On 7 August 2020, a third one was held, wherein opposition parties claimed that she had been removed. The result was initially delayed due to a lack of quorum. The speaker Mxolisi Ashford announced on 14 August that 31 councillors voted for the motion, 28 against, while 9 spoilt their ballots, effectively removing Mlamleli as mayor. Lebohang Masoetsa is now the acting mayor until the council meets to elect new leadership.

== Criminal charges and arrest ==
On 30 September 2020, members of South Africa's Hawks police unit arrested Mlamleli on criminal charges stemming from a controversial asbestos contract which was made during her time with the MEC and taken into custody at the Bainsvlei police station. Other co-defendants of Mlameli would be arrested as well. All seven people charged in the asbestos corruption case, including Mlamleli, were granted bail.
