= Rodenbeck =

- Location within Free State (South African province) Location within South Africa
- Coordinates: 29.185°S 26.285°E
- Country: South Africa
- Province: Free State
- Municipality: Mangaung
- Main Place: Bloemfontein

Area
  - Total: 19.12 km^{2} (7.38 sq mi)

Population (2011)
  - Total: 46,566
  - Density: 2,435/km^{2} (6,308/sq mi)

Racial makeup (2011)
  - Black African: 94.7%
  - Coloured: 4.8%
  - Indian/Asian: 0.2%
  - White: 0.1%
  - Other: 0.2%

First languages (2011)
  - Sotho: 65.3%
  - Xhosa: 14.4%
  - Tswana: 8.2%
  - Afrikaans: 7.0%
  - Other: 5.1%
- Time zone: UTC+2 (SAST)
- PO box: 9301

Rodenbeck is a 95% Black township of the city of Bloemfontein in South Africa.
