= John Wessels (rugby union) =

South African rugby union player

- Full name: Johanses Wilhelmus Wessels
- Born: 14 May 1935 Van Stadensrus, South Africa
- Died: 22 January 2006 (aged 70)

Rugby union career
- Position: Hooker
Provincial / State sides
| Years | Team | Apps | (Points) |
- Orange Free State
International career
| Years | Team | Apps | (Points) |
| 1965 | South Africa | | |

Johannes Wilhelmus Wessels (14 May 1935 – 22 January 2006) was a South African international rugby union player.

Wessels was born in Van Stadensrus and educated at Grey College.

A hooker, Wessels represented Orange Free State and earned Springboks representative honours on their 1965 tour of Scotland and Ireland. The short tour included two Test matches, which Wessels both missed, instead wearing Springboks colours for fixtures against Combined Universities and Scottish Districts.

Wessels married national netball player Sussie Esterhuizen.

== See also ==
- List of South Africa national rugby union players
