= David Rabin =

American physician

Dr. David Rabin
- Born: January 25, 1934; Zastron, South Africa
- Died: October 26, 1984 (aged 50)
- Occupation: Professor

David Rabin (January 25, 1934 - October 26, 1984) was an endocrinology professor at Vanderbilt University where he researched the possibility of a male contraceptive. Born in Zastron, South Africa as the youngest of four children he was diagnosed with amyotrophic lateral sclerosis (Lou Gehrig's disease) in 1979. Despite his ailments he was able to continue his research with the aid of a computer

== Publication ==
- Rabin, David; Mckenna, T. Joseph (1982). Clinical endocrinology and metabolism : principles and practice. New York [u.a.]: Grune & Stratton. ISBN 0808913948.
