= Native Military Corps =

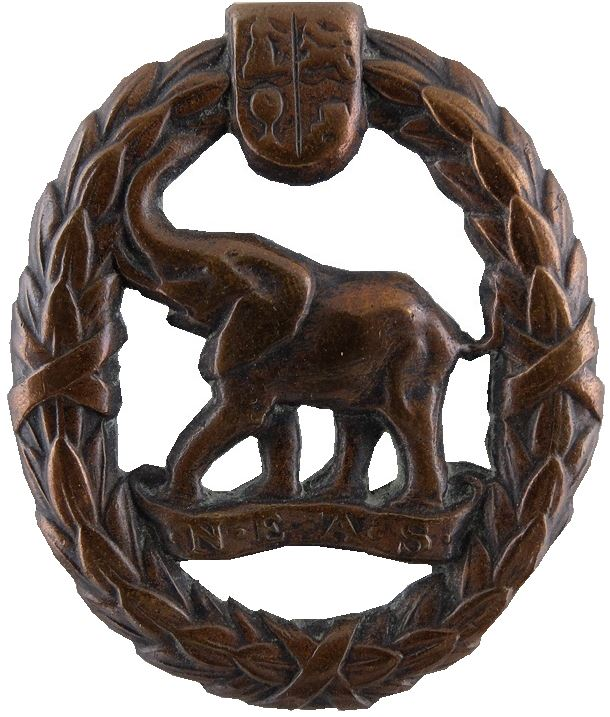
- Active: 1940 – 1947
- Disbanded: September 1947
- Country: South Africa
- Allegiance: (Union of South Africa) South Africa
- Branch: Non-European Army Services
- Size: 76,000 – 80,000

Commanders
- Notable commanders: Colonel Ernest Thomas Stubbs; Lt. Colonel B.W. Martin

The Native Military Corps (NMC) was a South African military unit during World War II. It consisted of Black South African volunteers recruited into the Union Defence Force (UDF). Despite the unit's name, they had no combative role and served as labourers attached to white South African UDF military units. The objective was to free up the limited number of white recruits in the UDF for combat roles.

== Background ==
On 12 July 1940 the UDF created the Directorate of Non-European Army Services (NEAS) to recruit non-white South Africans into the military. The NEAS would consist of three units, Cape Corps, the Indian & Malay Corps and the Native Labour Corps, prior to its name change in August 1940 to the Native Military Corps.

The NEAS was under the command of a director and deputy director who would be responsible for their soldiers when in the Middle East. The first commander was Lt. Colonel B.W. Martin, previously a Director of Native Labour on the Witwatersrand, but he was shifted to the role of deputy director of NEAS troops in the Middle East in November 1940 when Colonel Ernest Thomas Stubbs became director, appointed by General Jan Smuts. Stubbs' previous military role was as a recruiter with the South African Native Labour Corps during World War I. This would cause conflict between the two and poor cooperation between the NEAS in South Africa and the NEAS command in the Middle East with the black troops caught in the middle.

== Recruitment ==
=== Opposition to recruitment ===
General Jan Smuts had narrowly succeeded in parliament in having South Africa join Britain and France in the war with Germany. A considerable number of white Afrikaners opposed supporting Britain in its war with many having pro-German sympathies. To supplement the shortage of white soldiers, Jan Smuts and Major WHE Poole, Deputy Chief of the General Staff believed non-white recruitment was required. Sir Pierre van Ryneveld, Chief of the General Staff opposed the suggestion. White South Africans were also not sympathetic to the idea of black soldiers serving with equal authority with white soldiers and their close contact with the latter as well being exposed to overseas societies and their politics. Black soldiers would serve in non-combatant roles as the 1912 Act that created the UDF dictated no combat roles for any who serve the organisation. Like during World War I, mines, industry and farmers were opposed to the recruitment of black soldiers fearing the loss of cheap labour.

The African National Congress (ANC) and other black organisations supported the war and initially the role of blacks soldiers on condition that they were armed and that there were political rewards for the black population thereafter. There was opposition by blacks to the use of labour battalions. Prior to its final name it was called the Native Military Guards precisely for that reason, though these guards would only carry traditional weapons.

=== Recruiting ===
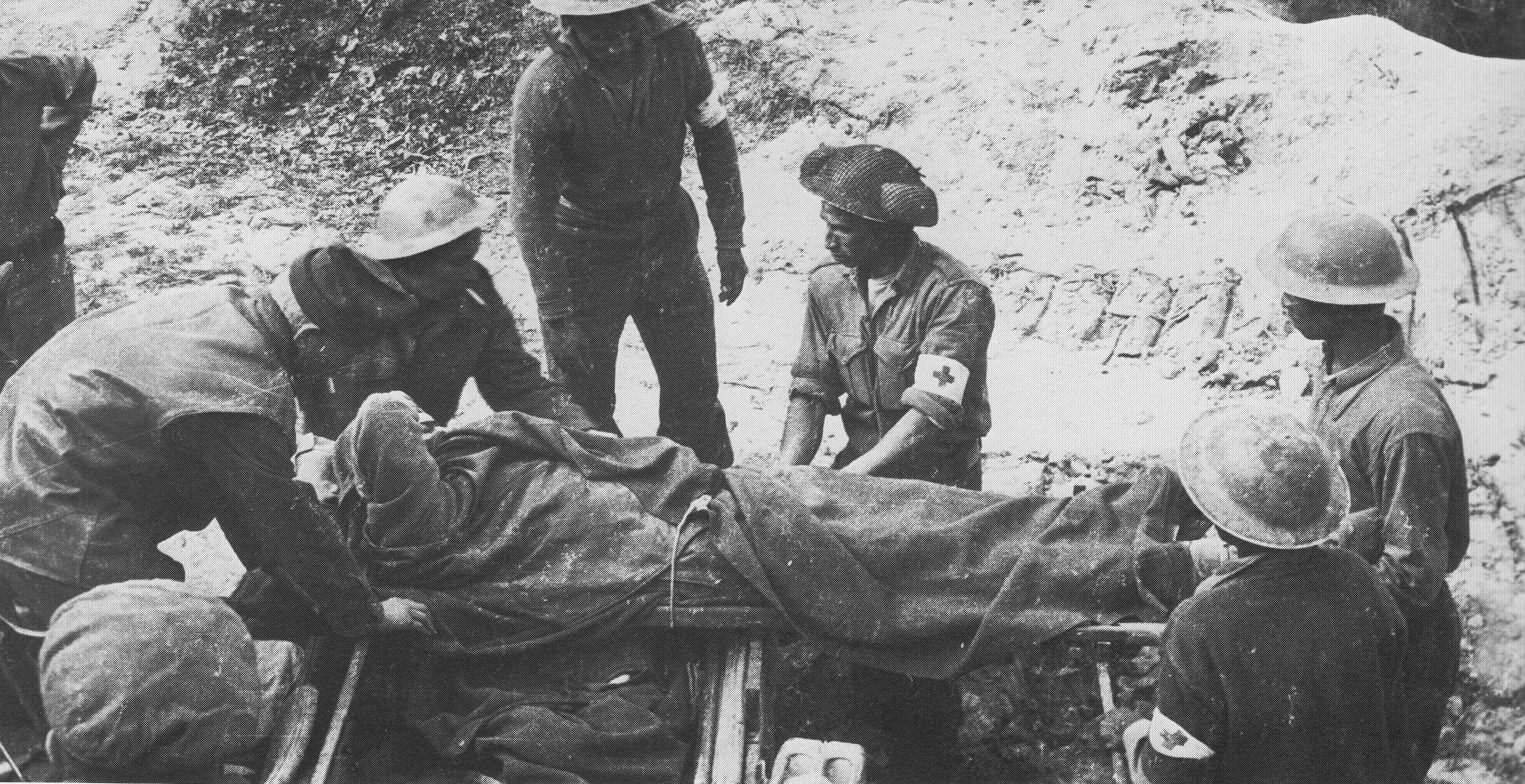
Corps stretcher bearers Western Desert

In early 1940, the NEAS had set recruitment levels at 8,000 black troops, but by 1941, requirements had changed drastically and the NEAS were looking at levels of 60,000 men. Recruitment came to an end in 1943 as the Allies gained the upper hand over the Axis forces in North Africa and the need for these types of troops reduced. Figures differ over the final levels with 77,239 as a UDF estimate to others as high 80,479 which may include recruits that were rejected. Figures show the highest recruitment came from the Transvaal, 52,037, mostly because of a drought in the Northern Transvaal, 9,555 from the Cape Province, 7,366 from Natal, 4,522 from the Orange Free State and 7,000 from South-West Africa. Thirty percent of recruits came from urban South Africa with the other seventy percent coming from the rural areas.

Initial recruitment was through posters and film. Recruitment posters were often mounted in public places frequented by black men. Propaganda recruitment films showing recruits in training were used too, making use of mobile film vans that showed films in black regions of the country. Attempts were made to use Native Commissioners to recruit black men but they were more a hindrance to the process as most black people mistrusted them to begin with. An attempt was made to private companies to promote recruitment to their own black staff but this was frowned upon by the white owners.

Another method was to approach the Black chiefs in rural areas and with monetary incentives get them to command some of their men to sign recruitment papers. This method was open to abuse by the chiefs in the choice of who went as well as fraudulent practices of accepting state money followed by the failure to provide recruits.

There were also issues concerning the perceptions about the war and expectations of what their roles would be in Military Native Corps. Most rural black people had little understanding of what the war in Europe was about and there was an expectation by some potential recruits that their training would involve the learning of new trade excluded by racial labour employment laws within the country.

Poor pay rates also hampered recruitment. As within civilian life, pay rates were based on race with black people on the lowest end of the scale with basic pay in the corps set at 1s 6p a day for unmarried troops and those with dependents, 2s 3p as opposed to basic white troops who were paid 5s a day. The highest rank that black troop could achieve was a sergeant. The other obstacle was the refusal of lower white ranks to take orders from a black soldier of higher rank. This would could only be overcome if a white officer gave the black soldier permission.

== Roles in the unit ==
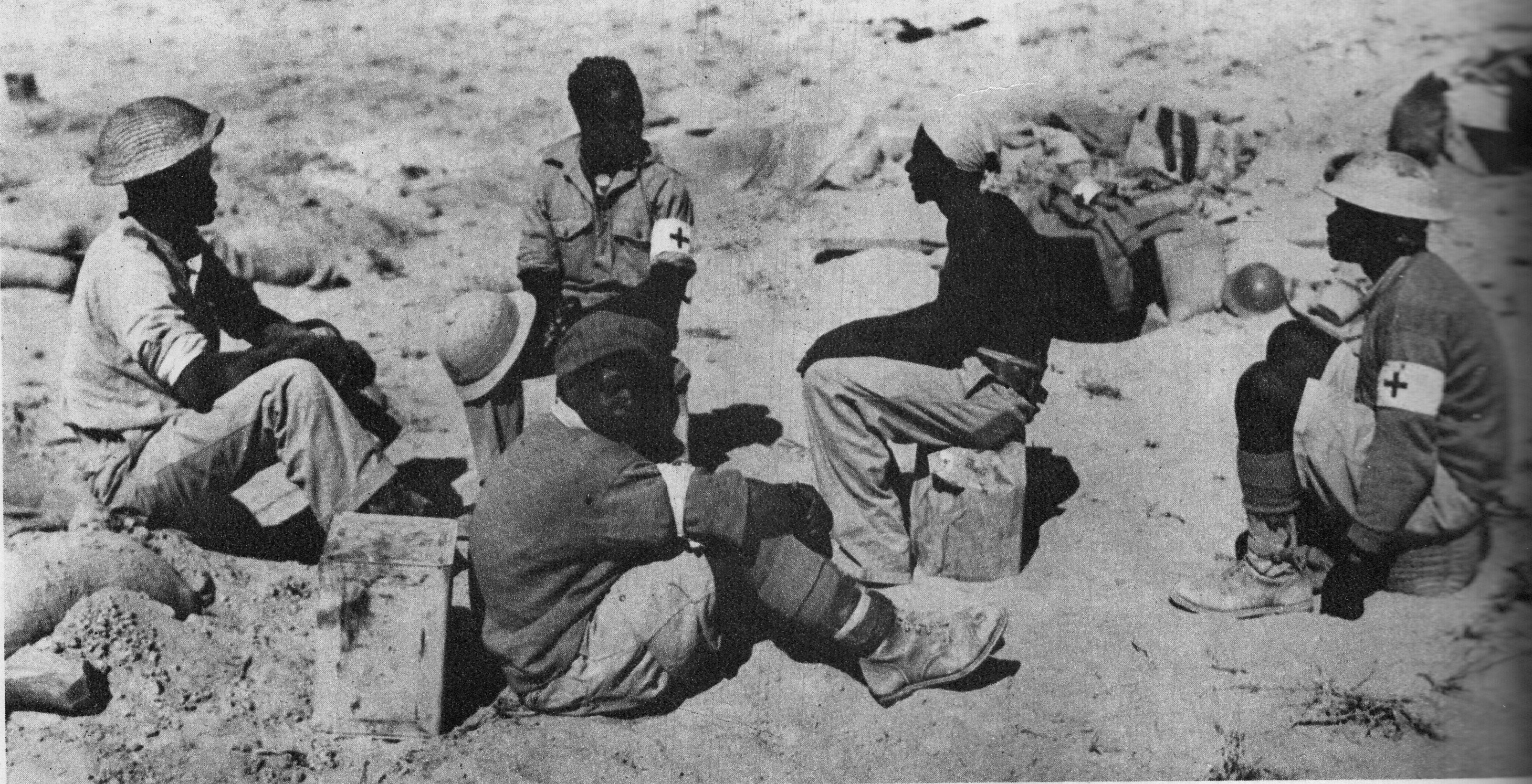
South African Native Military Corps stretcher-bearers in the Western Desert in 1941

The recruits' role was envisioned to initially be guards and labourers. They would guard military installations, vital infrastructure and prisoners of war. The latter did not go down well within the white population and they would in future be guarded by white soldiers only. By 1941, due to shortages of UDF manpower, black soldiers' roles were increased to transport drivers, dispatch riders, medic and office roles at home and abroad.

== Prisoners of war ==
During the war, 1,753 Native Military Corps soldiers were captured by German and Italian forces and most taken prisoner at Tobruk. The Germans were said to have treated the black soldiers better than the Italians though most continued performing menial and dangerous tasks in the war zone as POWs for those forces. Some would be later be repatriated from Africa to France, Italy and Germany. The prisoners would receive the same Geneva Convention rights as other prisoners including Red Cross visits, food parcels and letters from home.

== Decorations ==
Unlike black troops during World War I, black troops of the Native Military Corps were awarded medals for service during conflict in World War II. 119 medals or commendations were awarded to the troops with one Distinguished Conduct Medal awarded for exceptional acts of bravery, sixteen Military Medals (MM) for bravery in battle and two British Empire Medals for meritorious military service. One King's Medal for Bravery, 21 Mentions in Dispatches, 6 Gazetted Commendations, 3 Commendation Cards and 69 Certificates of Good Service were also awarded.

=== Distinguished Conduct Medal ===
Corporal Lucas Majozi was awarded a DCM for evacuating wounded soldiers from the battlefield under fire and wounded himself. His medal, one below the Victoria Cross is now in possession of the South African National Museum of Military History in Johannesburg.

=== Military Medal ===
The Military Medal was instituted in 1916 and was awarded to warrant officers, non-commissioned officers and privates for bravery in the field. Recipients are entitled to use the letters MM behind their name. The following Native Military Corps (NMC), Coloured Corps (CC) and Indian and Malay Corps (IMC) South Africans were awarded the Military Medal:

Surname	Name	Rank	Service Number	Corps	Date of action	Origin	Notes
Moloi	Reuben	Sgt	N14051	NMC		Johannesburg	Awarded MM after being captured by Germans, escaping and spending 17 days crossing the desert back to Allied lines. Cited in London Gazette 24 November 1942.
Masemula	Springkaan	Pte	N12389	NMC		Pretoria	Cited in London Gazette 24 November 1942.
Masego	Job	L/Cpl	N4448	NMC		Springs	Awarded MM when as a POW, he accumulated explosives and sank a German ship in Tobruk before escaping. Cited in London Gazette 11 March 1943.
Tshaka	Hermanus	Pte	N10718	NMC		Bloemfontein	Cited in London Gazette 24 November 1942.
Gazi	Berry	Cpl	N15769	NMC	1941	Kroonstad	Gazi participated in the Western Desert campaign as part of the 2nd Infantry Division and was awarded the Military Medal for rescuing wounded under enemy fire at Bardia, Libya on 16 December 1941. He and Pte. Makgotlo were the first black South Africans to be awarded this medal. Cited in London Gazette 3 March 1942.
Booysen	John	Gnr	C276049	CC		Graaf-Reinet	Cited in London Gazette 22 September 1942.
Fillies	Solomon	L/Cpl	M16468	IMC		Mossel Bay	Cited in London Gazette 8 March 1945.
Gampepe	John		N19961	NMC		Bloemfontein	
Kalamure	George		N9044	NMC		Bloemfontein	
Loubser	William	Gnr	C304505	CC		Cape Town	Cited in London Gazette 26 July 1945.
Makgotlo	John	Pte	N10373	NMC		Rustenburg	He and Pte. Gazi were the first black South Africans to be awarded this medal. Cited in London Gazette 3 March 1942.
Malale	Frank	Pte	N22127	NMC		Leydsdorp	Cited in London Gazette 11 March 1943.
Maluka	Moses	Pte	N26308	NMC		Pietersburg	Cited in London Gazette 11 March 1943.
Maoela	John		N9480	NMC		Premier Mine	
Masia	Alfred	Pte	N22191	NMC		Duiwelskloof	Cited in London Gazette 11 March 1943.
Masie	Samuel	Pte	N7597	NMC		Vredefort	
Moage	Amiel	Pte	N15887	NMC		Zeerust	Cited in The London Gazette 31 December 1942.
Mohlala	Jack	Pte	N18440	NMC		Pietersburg	Cited in London Gazette 11 March 1943.
Mothapo	Jantjie	Pte	N18281	NMC		Pietersburg	Cited in London Gazette 11 March 1943.
Peterson	Harry		C567276	CC		Johannesburg	
Phyfer	Johannes		C301132	CC		Laingsburg	
Radebe	John	Cpl	N15739	NMC	1941	Warden	Stretcher-bearer assigned to RDLI. Citation for his action in February 1941 reads "..worked unceasingly and tirelessly in full view of the enemy and under concentrated artillery, mortar and machine-gun fire, attending to the wounded and arranging the evacuation of the serious cases. He ceased his efforts only when the advancing enemy was 200 yards away, successfully withdrawing the stretcher-bearers under his command. In May 1941 he again displayed outstanding bravery at El Alamein where he evacuated wounded from forward positions, being wounded in the process. MM was awarded in February 1943.
Rayners	Jacob	Pte	C27294	CC		Uitenhage	Cited in London Gazette 22 September 1942.
Saphier	Nicolas	Cpl	M16827	IMC		Humansdorp	Awarded the MM for conspicuous gallantry for lifting mines to allow the extension of a track through the Mareth Line defences of Tripoli while attached to 11 Field Company, SA Engineering Corps. A mine was set off wounding Saphier and twelve other members of the platoon. He refused to have his wounds treated until all the others had been attended to and then proceeded to clear a safe lane for the evacuation of the casualties.
Stevens	Johannes	L/Cpl	C274047	CC		Vryburg	Cited in London Gazette 9 September 1942. He was assigned to 135 Motor Transport Company as a driver. He was driving a truck containing 30 German POWs and in bad weather, he lost contact with the other vehicles in the convoy and erroneously drove into a minefield. One of the rear wheels was destroyed and after changing the wheel Stevens attempted to reverse back out of the minefield following his tracks, but hit a mine on one of the front wheels. He led the prisoners out of the minefield on foot and guarded them through the night. He marched the prisoners under guard to a railway line where he secured transport to deliver the captives to the Allied guards at the designated POW camp.
Stevens	William		M14487	IMC		Cape Town	
Tonkin	Francis		M11795	IMC		Cape Town	
Volsum	Antony		M10537	IMC		Durban	

=== British Empire Medal ===
The British Empire Medal was instituted in 1917 and was awarded to warrant officers, non-commissioned officers and privates for meritorious and gallant service. Recipients are entitled to use the letters BEM behind their name. The following Native Military Corps (NMC), Coloured Corps (CC) Indian Military Corps (IMC) and Naval Forces (SANF) South Africans were awarded the British Empire Medal:

Surname	Name	Rank	Service Number	Corps	Origin	Notes
Abrahams	Ebrahim		C12958	CC	Paarl	
Carelsen	Martin	Cpl	C275994	CC	Oudtshoorn	Volunteered for service in January 1941 and was attached to 158th Works Company, South African Engineering Corps. Awarded for three years of faultless work and exceptional devotion to duty, particularly for managing all company transport and fifty drivers under battlefield conditions. He displayed natural leadership regardless of his limited education. He ended his service in Morocco in 1945.
Colbert	John		C276144	CC	Bloemfontein	
Edwards	James		C288019	CC	Uitenhage	
Greeve	Martin		CN72251	SANF	Cape Town	
Hlanyane	Eugene		N68677	NMC	Kroonstad	
Matlakala	Lenong		N4736	NMC	Maseru	
Moeketsi	Lesogo		N43753	NMC	Rustenburg	
Plaatjies	Hendrik		C275004	CC	Ladysmith	

== Casualties ==
Figures from the war indicate that the Native Military Corps suffered 770 men wounded and 1,519 dead or presumed dead. The Commonwealth War Graves Commission records 1,677 men of the Native Military Corps buried around the world. The majority of graves are commemorated in South Africa but graves are also found in Egypt, Libya, Italy, France, Germany, Myanmar, Lesotho, Kenya and Namibia.

== Other veterans ==
Other well known black South Africans who were members of the Native Military Corps include:

- Potlako Leballo
- Henry Nxumalo
- Herman Andimba Toivo ya Toivo
