= Job Masego Regiment =

Job Masego Regiment (Note: Formerly Regiment Noord-Transvaal/Regiment North Transvaal)
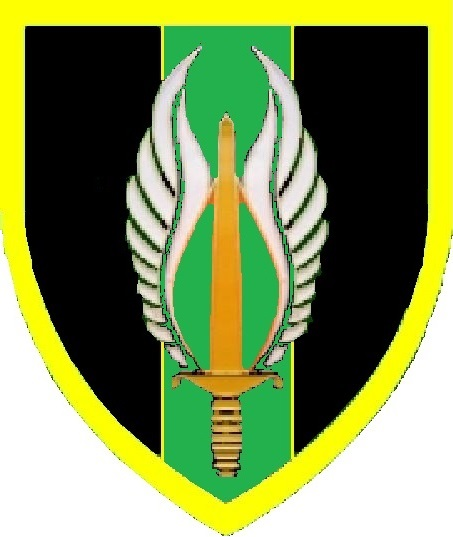
- SANDF Regiment Northern Transvaal emblem
- Active: January 1964 to present
- Country: South Africa
- Allegiance: Republic of South Africa; Republic of South Africa
- Branch: South African Army; South African Army
- Type: Infantry
- Role: Mechanised infantry
- Size: One battalion
- Part of: South African Infantry Formation; Army Conventional Reserve
- Garrison/HQ: Pretoria, Gauteng
- Motto: Ons sal (We shall)

Insignia
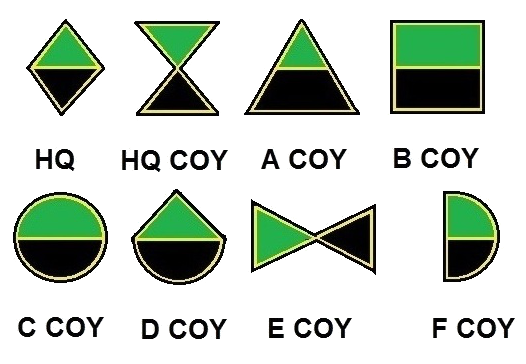
- Company level Insignia

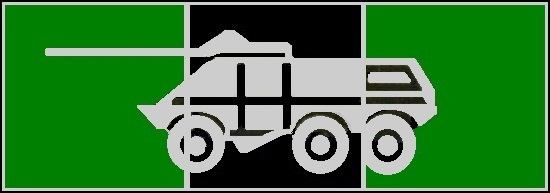
- SA Mechanised Infantry beret bar c. 1992: SA mechanised infantry beret bar c. 1992
- Abbreviation: JMR

The Job Masego Regiment (formerly Regiment Noord-Transvaal) is a reserve mechanised infantry regiment of the South African Army.

== History ==
Regiment Noord-Transvaal / Regiment Northern Transvaal (RNT) was a reserve unit formed in 1963 and came into service in January 1964. Regiment Noord-Transvaal was initially an armoured unit. Its headquarters is close to the SA Army Headquarters complex. In those days RNT was part of 16 Armoured Brigade and later 81 Armoured Brigade.

=== With the SADF ===
==== With 16 Brigade ====
1 RNT was one of the original units utilised in this era to develop the mechanization of a conventional force for the SADF under typical South African conditions.

==== With 81 Brigade ====
Mechanised training was originally conducted in soft-skinned vehicles which then progressed to Saracens and finally to the Ratel Infantry Fighting vehicle by 1976. 1 RNT was the first unit to be completely outfitted as a mechanised battalion during Exercise Mainstay around 1977.

==== The second battalion ====
In 1969, the regiment was split into two battalions 1RNT and 2 RNT

==== Operations ====
In 1975, 1RNT re-mustered to a reserve mechanised infantry unit and took part in the South African Border War in Namibia and at home in counter insurgency operations.

1RNT stayed involved in that conflict to the end, taking part in Operations Moduler, Hooper, Packer and Prone in 1987-8.

2RNT deployed extensively in numerous operations in a Motorised Infantry - Counter Insurgency (COIN) role in the South African Border War as well as on the Rhodesian / Zimbabwe border amongst others in the Soutpansberg Military Area (SMA). It reported into Northern Transvaal command (Later Gauteng Command) and Far Northern Command (73 Brigade) respectively. 2RNT also played a key role in Operation JAMBU in Katlahong / Vosloorus over the election period in 1994, when peace and stability was ensured in the Witwatersrand.

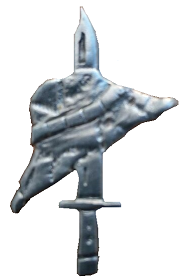
SADF Operation Hooper participation bar

=== With the SANDF ===
2RNT was incorporated / amalgamated into Tshwane Regiment along with 5 other Motorised Infantry regiments in 2000.

==== Name change ====
In August 2019, 52 Reserve Force units had their names changed to reflect the diverse military history of South Africa. Regiment Noord-Transvaal became the Job Masego Regiment, and have 3 years to design and implement new regimental insignia.

== Leadership ==
=== 1st Battalion ===
1st Battalion Leadership
From	Honorary Colonel	To	Ribbon
	No known incumbents		
From	Officer Commanding	To	Ribbon
	No known incumbents		
From	Regimental Sergeants Major	To	Ribbon
	No known incumbents		

=== 2nd Battalion ===
2nd Battalion Leadership
From	Honorary Colonel	To	Ribbon
	No known incumbents		
From	Officers Commanding	To	Ribbon
2020	Lt -Col FS (Cisco) van Schaik	2026	
1989	Cmdt GJ (Gerrie) Scholtz	1991	
1979	Cmdt (Deon) Liebenberg	1988	
1970	Cmdt Fick Fourie	1978	
1965	Cmdt Rex Le Roux	1969	
From	Regimental Sergeants Major	To	Ribbon
2026	WO1 Maako	2026	

== Insignia ==
The cap badge of RNT was loosely based on the SAS badge but the wings had a different shape and the dagger pointed upwards.

1RNT were the first to wear an infantry beret bar with a Ratel Fighting Vehicle on top of the colours. 2RNT's cap badge was worn with a red felt backing to distinguish it from 1RNT.

=== Previous Dress Insignia ===
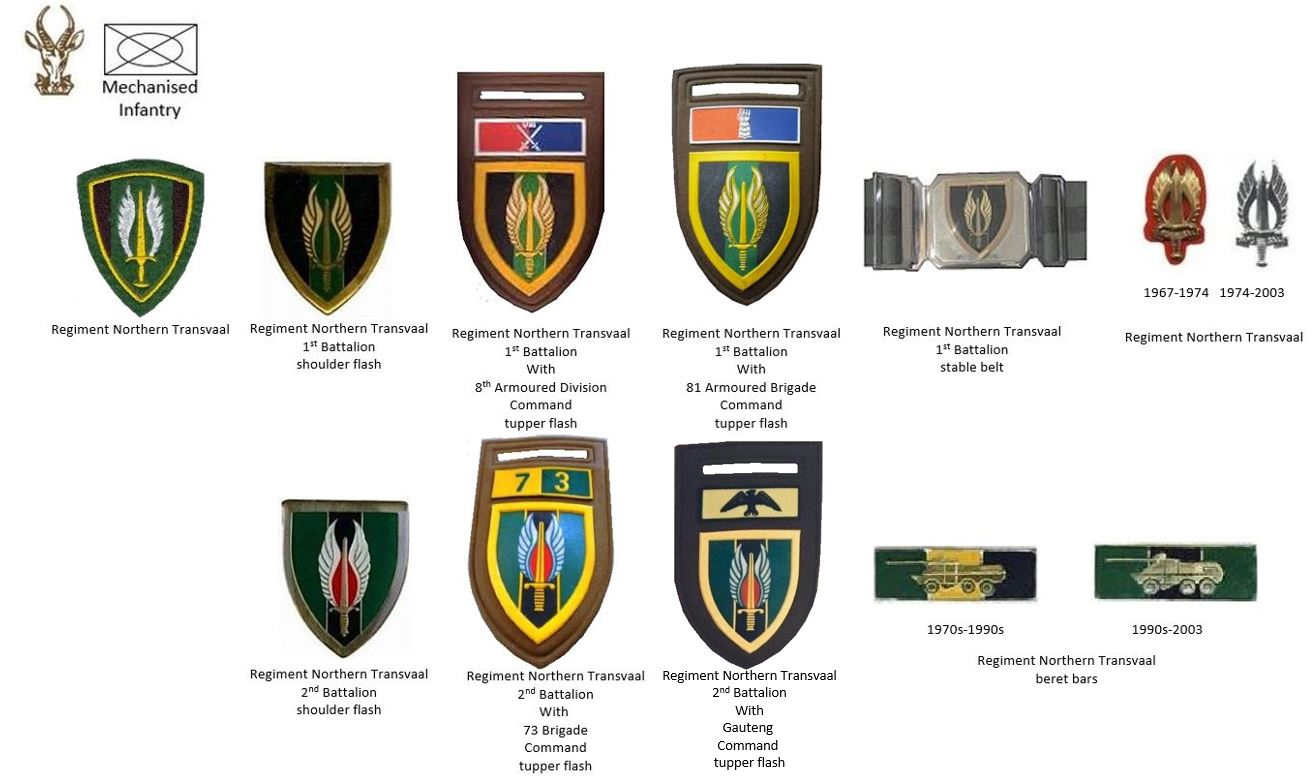
SADF Regiment Northern Transvaal insignia

=== Current Dress Insignia ===
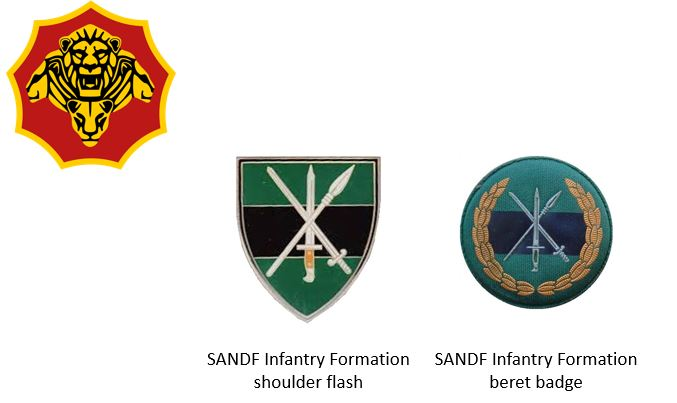
SANDF era Infantry Formation insignia
