= Neville Lewis =

South African artist (1895–1972)

Alfred Neville Lewis
- Born: Alfred Neville Lewis; 1895; Cape Town, Cape Colony
- Died: 26 June 1972 (aged 76–77); Stellenbosch, South Africa
- Citizenship: South Africa
- Education: Fine art
- Alma mater: Slade School of Art
- Occupations: Artist, painter
- Years active: c. 1915–1972
- Known for: Portrait and still life painting; war art
- Notable work: Portrait of Albert van der Sandt Centlivres; Portraits of Field Marshal Bernard Law Montgomery
- Movement: Portrait realism
- Spouses: Theodosia Madeleine Cecilia Townshend (m. c. 1919; div. 1922); Countess Rosa Cecilie Karoline-Mathilde Irene Sibylla Anna zu Solms-Baruth (m. 1955)
- Children: 5
- Parent: Rev. A. J. S. Lewis (father)
- Awards: Member, New English Art Club (1920)

Alfred Neville Lewis (1895 – 1972) was a South African artist known for portrait and still life painting. He was born in Cape Town, Cape Colony, and educated there and, later, at the Slade School of Art in London.

== Early life and education ==
Lewis was born in Cape Town, Cape Colony, and educated there and, later moved to England in 1912. He was first taught by Stanhope Forbes in the artistic colony of Newlyn, Cornwall and later formally trained at Slade School of Art in London.

His father was the Reverend A. J. S. Lewis, who was Mayor of Cape Town, and on 4 October 1929, officially opened the Table Mountain Aerial Cableway.

== Career ==
Neville served in World War I in France, Belgium, and Italy.During World War II he carried on producing portraits in oil. He frequently painted and drew black South Africans. He painted three portraits of Field Marshal Bernard Law Montgomery. He also painted several persons actively involved in the war effort ranging from a member of the South African Native Military Corps to a nurse. Several of these images were used for postage stamps during the war.

The painting Portrait of Albert van der Sandt Centlivres by Neville was burned by demonstrators during the Rhodes Must Fall upheaval at the University of Cape Town in February 2016. His work is held in the South Africa National Gallery, Cape Town, Johannesburg Gallery, Durban Art Gallery and in Britain, the National Gallery, Tate, Imperial War Museum and also various European galleries, such as the Gallery of Modern Art in Madrid.

== Personal life ==
Neville married Theodosia Madeleine Cecilia Townshend a fellow student from Ireland https://www.askart.com/artist/Alfred_Neville_Lewis/11142993/Alfred_Neville_Lewis.aspx[1]. When his marriage broke up in 1922 his two sons Tom and David went to Cape Town where they were raised by their grandparents and his daughter Catherine stayed with his ex-wife.

He married German aristocrat Countess Rosa Cecilie Karoline-Mathilde Irene Sibylla Anna zu Solms-Baruth, daughter of Friedrich, 3rd Prince of Solms-Baruth and his wife Princess Adelaide of Schleswig-Holstein-Sonderburg-Glücksburg, on 3 November 1955 and settled on Rowan Street, Stellenbosch where their children Caroline and Frederick Henry Lewis attended school.

Later the couple acquired a small holding opposite the Stellenbosch Golf Club where his wife and children could pursue their love of horse riding. After his death in 1972, his wife married Weber.

== Achievements and recognitions ==
Neville became a member of the New English Art Club in 1920. He held numerous one-man exhibitions in London, South Africa, Europe and the USA. He was included in the South African War Art at the Royal Academy (1948) and Oversees exhibition of South African Art at the Tate (1952).

== Death ==
Neville died on 26 June 1972 in Stellenbosch, South Africa.

== See also ==
- Augustus John
- Ambrose McEvoy
- Henry Tonks

== Art works ==
- King Sobhuza II portrait of Sobhuza II of Swaziland
- Lt Col (Mrs) Doreen Dunning (1941)
- Young girl with scarf
- Pondo girl with a blue blanket
- Pondo woman
- Portrait of Lucas Majozi (1942)
- Seated nude
- Job Maseko, Job Masego, Black South African soldier who sunk a German supply boat in the Tobruk Harbour during World War II.
