= Job Maseko =

Black South African soldier in World War II

Lance Corporal Job Maseko MM
- Painting of Job Maseko by Alfred Neville Lewis
- Born: 1922; Kwa-Thema
- Died: 7 March 1952 (aged 29–30); Springs, Transvaal, Union of South Africa (now Gauteng, South Africa)
- Military career
- Allegiance: South Africa
- Branch: Native Military Corps
- Rank: Lance Corporal
- Units: South African 2nd Infantry Division, South African 1st Infantry Division, South African 6th Armoured Division
- Conflicts: World War II: Bardia; Clayden's Trench (Sollum); Gazala; Second Battle of Tobruk; Second Battle of El Alamein; Italian Campaign WWII
- Awards: Military Medal

Job Maseko MM (1922 – 7 March 1952) was a South African soldier during World War II, serving in the Native Military Corps as part of the South African 2nd Infantry Division. He was one of many Allied troops captured by the Axis in the surrender of the port of Tobruk in 1942.

He gained fame by his actions in sinking a German vessel with a milk can while serving as a POW stevedore in Tobruk harbour, for which he was awarded the Military Medal.

== Before the war ==
Before the war, Maseko worked as a miner in Springs, Union of South Africa. After completion of basic training, he was sent to North Africa to join the 2nd South African Division.

== Surrender and sabotage ==
Maseko became a prisoner of war on 21 June 1942 when Major-General Hendrik Klopper, commander of the South African 2nd Infantry Division surrendered the Tobruk Garrison with 32,000 men to Field Marshal Erwin Rommel. The garrison included 10,722 South Africans of the 2nd Division (of which 1,200 were Native Military Corps members).

The Germans separated their prisoners by race. The white troops were sent to POW camps in Europe, but the prisoners of colour were retained in Italian POW camps in Africa where they were forced to work as manual labourers under horrific conditions. Part of the prisoners' forced labour involved loading and unloading supplies from German freight ships in the port of Tobruk. With his pre-war experience and exposure to explosives, while unloading cargo from a German freight ship in the Tobruk harbour on 21 July 1942, Maseko got three of his fellow prisoners (Note: Andrew Mohudi, Sam Police and Koos Williams) to distract the German guards while he got busy below deck making a bomb using his pre-war mining experience. Using ammunition from which he extracted the cordite and a long fuse, Maseko put together an improvised explosive device which he stashed among jerry-cans of gasoline in the ship's hold. While he and his fellow prisoners were taking the final load off the ship, Maseko lit the fuse and then left the ship. The ship was destroyed in the explosion and the subsequent fire. The next day, the POWs were questioned about smoking while on board ship – to which they answered that cigarettes were forbidden and were not included in any rations, which could not be disputed by their Italian captors.

Maseko later escaped from the Italian POW camp in Tobruk and walked for three weeks through the desert and enemy lines to El Alamein. In October 1942 he joined in the defeat of his German and Italian captors as a stretcher bearer with the 1st South African Infantry Division in the Second Battle of El Alamein. After El Alamein, he was transferred to the 6th South African Armoured Division and was gazetted as a recipient of the Military Medal (MM) for his actions in Tobruk on 11 March 1943. The award was later bestowed on him by Major-General Francois Henry "Frank" Theron while in Italy with the armoured division.

He attained the rank of lance corporal during his service.

== Awards ==
=== Military Medal ===
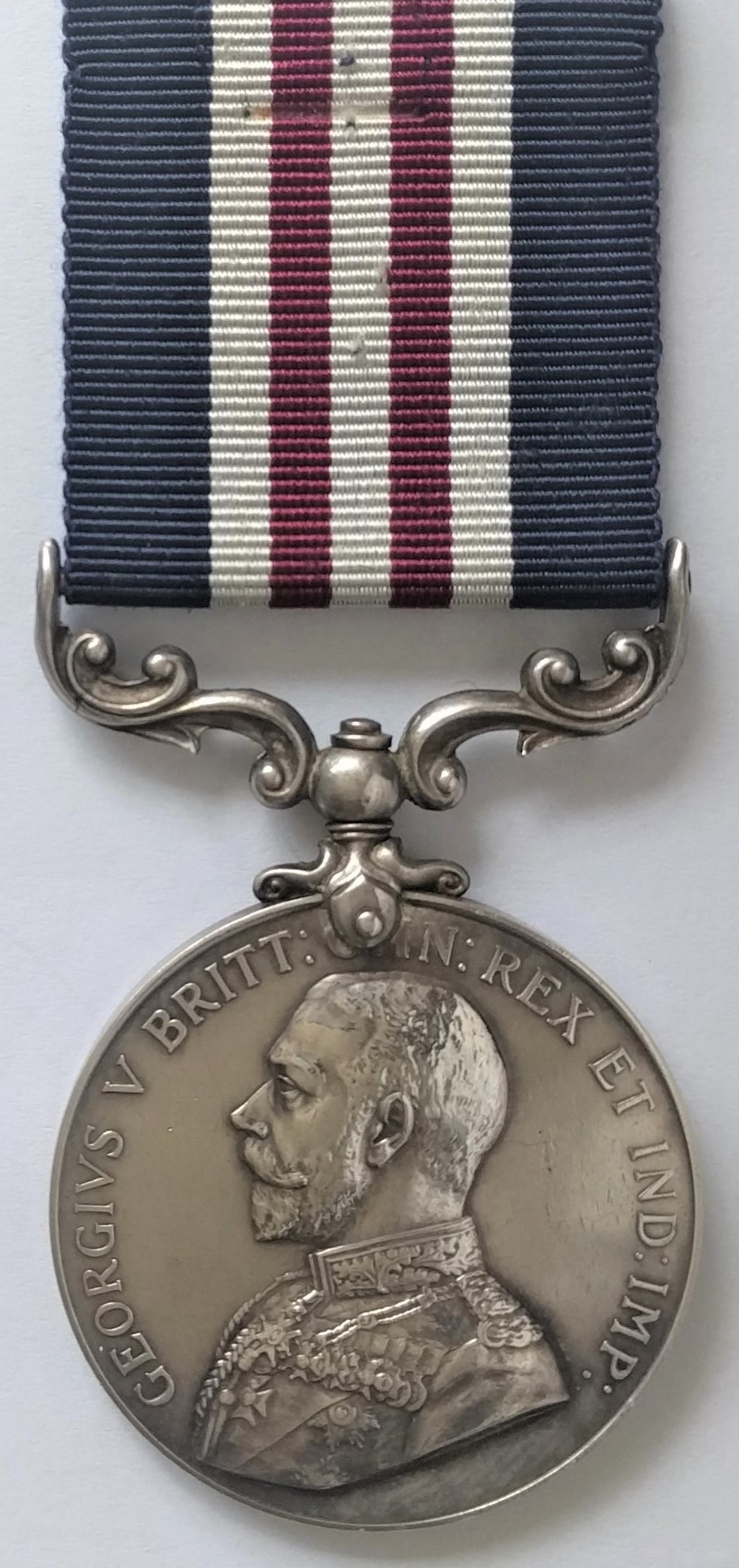
Military Medal as awarded to Maseko. The citation incorrectly referred to him as Job "Masego"

Maseko was decorated with the Military Medal. The citation reads as follows:

The King has been graciously pleased to approve the following award in recognition of gallant and distinguished service in the Middle East:

MILITARY MEDAL

No N 4448 L/Cpl Job Masego (sic) - Native Military Corps

CITATION

For meritorious and courageous action in that on or about the 21st July, while a Prisoner of War, he, Job Masego, sank a fully laden enemy steamer - probably an "F" boat - while moored in Tobruk Harbour.

This he did by placing a small tin filled with gunpowder in among drums of petrol in the hold, leading a fuse therefrom to the hatch and lighting the fuse upon closing the hatch.

In carrying out this deliberately planned action, Job Masego displayed ingenuity, determination and complete disregard of personal safety from punishment by the enemy or from the ensuing explosion which set the vessel alight.

War artist Neville Lewis, who painted Maseko's portrait, later claimed that Maseko had been nominated for the Victoria Cross for valour, but a senior military officer had vetoed the recommendation of giving such an honour to a black man, and he was awarded the Military Medal for gallantry instead. This unsubstantiated claim was repeated in 2021, to support an unsuccessful petition to the British government asking for Maseko to be awarded a posthumous Victoria Cross. However, the records at the United Kingdom National Archives tell a different story. They reveal that Maseko had actually been recommended for the British Empire Medal for gallantry, and the citation was upgraded to an immediate award of the Military Medal.

=== Service Medals ===
As with fellow service members, Maseko would have been awarded the following service medals in addition to the Military Medal:

- 1939–1945 Star
- Africa Star
- Italy Star
- War Medal
- Africa Service Medal

== Life after the war ==
After the war, like many other demobilised soldiers, he gained little recognition in the world of civilian life. In addition, the Apartheid-based general rule governing pension awards was that Coloured pension scales should amount to three-fifths and African pension scales to two-fifths of the rate applicable to whites. Most African ex-servicemen who had cherished high hopes of their post-war world were disillusioned when they could not find employment based on the new skills they had acquired in the army and that the standard of living to which they were accustomed while members of the South African forces were no longer applicable. For Maseko and members of the NMC, post-war South Africa was very much the same as the pre-1939 South Africa.

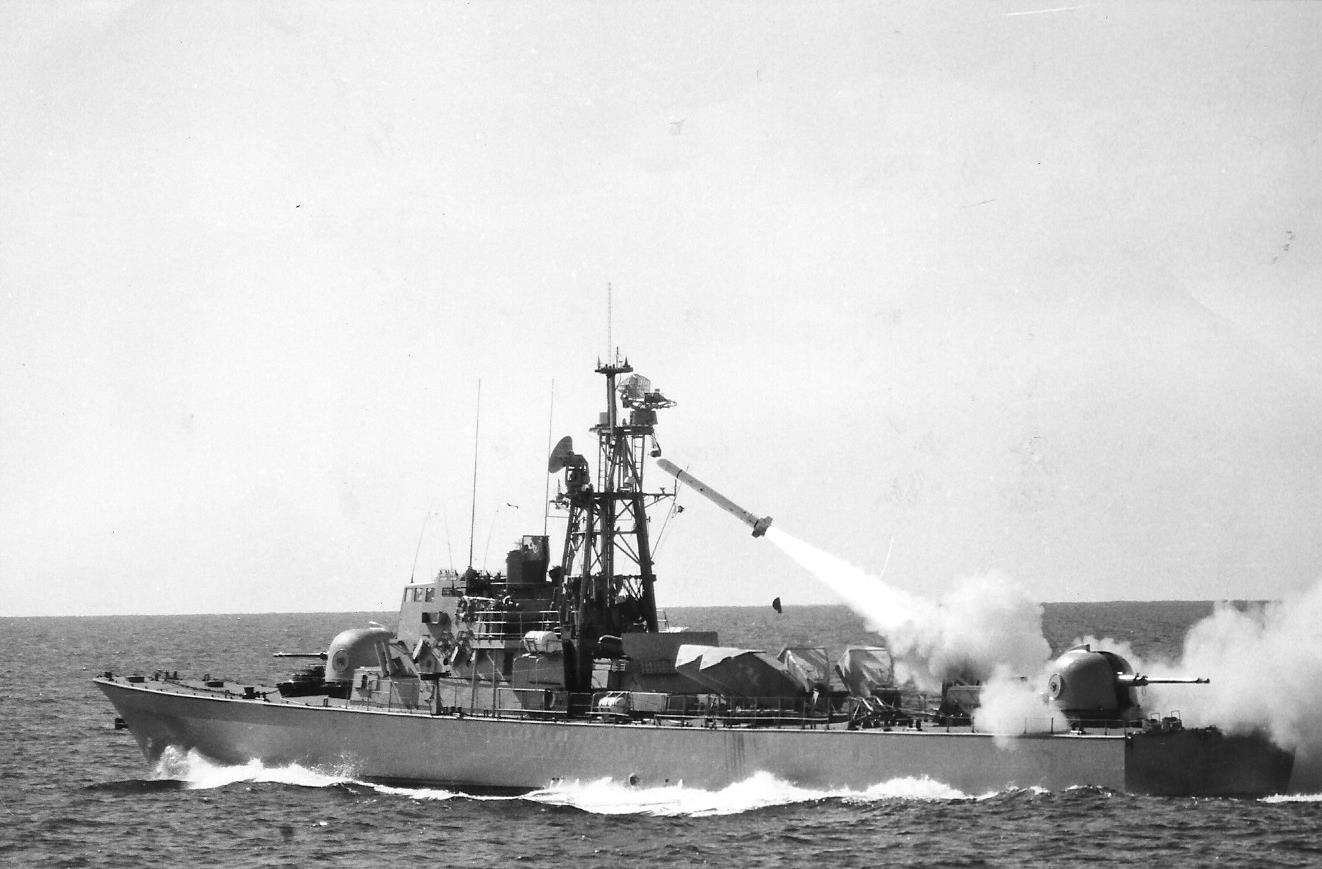
Sa'ar 4-class missile boat similar to the South African vessel named after Maseko

Maseko was struck and killed by a train on 7 March 1952; at the time of his death, he was so poor that his funeral was paid for by borrowed and donated funds. He was buried in the Payneville Township Cemetery in Springs, South Africa.

His death certificate gives his age as "+/- 30 years", which suggests that he was born around 1922. If so, he would have been about 20 years old at the time of the act for which he was decorated.

== Honours and recognition ==
In his honour, the township of KwaThema, near Springs, has a primary school named after him, as is the main road linking Springs to KwaThema. In 1997, the South African Navy renamed the missile attack craft SAS Kobie Coetzee as SAS Job Masego. In 2019, Regiment Noord-Transvaal was renamed Job Masego Regiment. It is unclear why the defence force spells his surname as 'Masego' rather than 'Maseko'.

In 2007, South African director Vincent Moloi made a documentary about Job Maseko and the South African 2nd Infantry Division called "A Pair of Boots and a Bicycle".
