= Van Stadensrus =

Van Stadensrus Thapelong
- Location within Free State (South African province) Location within South Africa
- Coordinates: 29.983°S 27.016°E
- Country: South Africa
- Province: Free State
- Municipality: Mangaung

Government
  - Type: Municipality
  - Mayor: Rose Mompati (ANC)

Area
  - Total: 7.2 km^{2} (2.8 sq mi)

Population (2011)
  - Total: 1,745
  - Density: 240/km^{2} (630/sq mi)

Racial makeup (2011)
  - Black African: 96.6%
  - Coloured: 0.6%
  - Indian/Asian: 0.2%
  - White: 2.1%
  - Other: 0.5%

First languages (2011)
  - Sotho: 85.4%
  - Xhosa: 5.6%
  - Afrikaans: 4.1%
  - English: 1.8%
  - Other: 3.2%
- Time zone: UTC+2 (SAST)
- Postal code (street): 9945
- PO box: 9945
- Area code: 051

Van Stadensrus is a settlement in Mangaung Metropolitan Municipality in the Free State province of South Africa.

The settlement is some 30 km south of Wepener and 35 km north-north-west of Zastron. It was laid out on the farm Mook in 1920 and proclaimed in 1925. Named after its founder, M H van Staden, who purchased the farm in 1908 and built the Egmeni or Egmont Dam nearby.
