= Naledi Local Municipality, Free State =

Coordinates: 29°34′59″S 26°40′26″E

Naledi
- Disestablshed local municipality
- Seal

- Location in the Free State
- Country: South Africa
- Province: Free State
- District: Xhariep
- Seat: Dewetsdorp
- Wards: 4

Government
  - Type: Municipal council
  - Mayor: Johnny Makitle

Area
  - Total: 3,424 km^{2} (1,322 sq mi)

Population (2011)
  - Total: 24,314
  - Density: 7.101/km^{2} (18.39/sq mi)

Racial makeup (2011)
  - Black African: 92.4%
  - Coloured: 1.9%
  - Indian/Asian: 0.5%
  - White: 4.9%

First languages (2011)
  - Sotho: 83.7%
  - Afrikaans: 7.7%
  - Xhosa: 3.4%
  - English: 2.3%
  - Other: 2.9%
- Time zone: UTC+2 (SAST)
- Municipal code: FS164

Naledi Local Municipality was a local municipality in the Free State province in South Africa. On 3 August 2016 it was disestablished and merged into the Mangaung Metropolitan Municipality. The name Naledi is a Sesotho word meaning "a star". The principal towns in the area of the disestablished municipality are Dewetsdorp and Wepener.

== Main places ==
The 2001 census divided the municipality into the following main places:

Place	Code	Area (km^{2})	Population
Dewetsdorp	40401	3.31	930
Morojaneng	40402	2.00	7,107
Qibing	40404	2.03	7,538
Thapelang	40405	0.39	847
Van Stadensrus	40406	2.07	495
Wepener	40407	3.47	1,663
Remainder of the municipality	40403	3,410.55	8,895

== Politics ==
The municipal council consisted of eight members elected by mixed-member proportional representation. Four councillors were elected by first-past-the-post voting in four wards, while the remaining four were chosen from party lists so that the total number of party representatives was proportional to the number of votes received. In the election of 18 May 2011 the African National Congress (ANC) won a majority of six seats on the council. The following table shows the results of the election.

Party	Votes				Seats		
Party	Ward	List	Total	%	Ward	List	Total
ANC	5,123	5,201	10,324	75.4	4	2	6
DA	1,136	1,088	2,224	16.2	0	1	1
COPE	329	316	645	4.7	0	1	1
APC	200	196	396	2.9	0	0	0
United Residents Front	61	43	104	0.8	0	0	0
Total	6,849	6,844	13,693	100.0	4	4	8
Spoilt votes	138	142	280				
