= Egmont Dam =

- Interactive map of Egmont Dam
- Official name: Egmont Dam
- Location: Free State, South Africa
- Coordinates: 30°02′55.4″S 27°02′22.7″E
- Opening date: 1937
- Operators: Department of Water Affairs and Forestry

Dam and spillways
- Type of dam: arch
- Impounds: Witspruit
- Height: 24 m
- Length: 107 m

Reservoir
- Creates: Egmont Dam Reservoir
- Total capacity: 9,784,000 m³
- Catchment area: 310 km^{2}
- Surface area: 244.2 ha

Egmont Dam is an arch type dam on the Witspruit, near Van Stadensrus, Free State, South Africa. It was established in 1937 and its main purpose is for irrigation use. The hazard potential of the dam is ranked to be high (3).

== See also ==
- List of reservoirs and dams in South Africa
- List of rivers of South Africa
