= Mxolisi Siyonzana =

South African politician

Executive Mayor of the Mangaung Metropolitan Municipality
- In office 16 August 2021 – 6 March 2023
- Preceded by: Lebohang Masoetsa (acting); Olly Mlamleli

Personal details
- Party: African National Congress

Mxolisi Siyonzana is a South African politician who served as the Executive Mayor of the Mangaung Metropolitan Municipality in the Free State Province from 16 August 2021 until 6 March 2023. He replaced Olly Mlamleli, who was removed in a motion of no confidence back in August 2020. Siyonzana is a member of the African National Congress and the former speaker of the metropolitan municipality. He has been described as an ally of former Free State premier and current suspended ANC Secretary-General Ace Magashule.

== Removal from office ==
On 2 November 2022, the interim Mangaung ANC Regional Executive Committee "recalled" Siyonzana over serious allegations of financial mismanagement, poor governance and lack of service delivery. The interim ANC Provincial Executive Committee soon followed suit with wanting Siyonzana to be removed as mayor. While speaking at the ANC Youth League Peter Mokaba Memorial Lecture in January 2023, newly elected ANC Secretary-General Fikile Mbalula criticised Siyonzana, accusing him of "sleeping on the job". Siyonzana resigned from office on 6 March 2023 after the National Executive Committee of the African National Congress selected Gregory Nthatisi to replace him.
