= Mohokare Local Municipality =

Coordinates: 30°17′57″S 27°05′36″E

Mohokare
- Local municipality
- Seal

- Location in the Free State
- Country: South Africa
- Province: Free State
- District: Xhariep
- Seat: Zastron
- Wards: 6

Government
  - Type: Municipal council
  - Mayor: Zingisa Mgauli

Area
  - Total: 8,776 km^{2} (3,388 sq mi)

Population (2022)
  - Total: 36,968
  - Density: 4.212/km^{2} (10.91/sq mi)

Racial makeup (2022)
  - Black African: 89.7%
  - Coloured: 1.9%
  - White: 8.0%

First languages (2011)
  - Sotho: 64.1%
  - Xhosa: 23.5%
  - Afrikaans: 8.9%
  - English: 1.1%
  - Other: 2.4%
- Time zone: UTC+2 (SAST)
- Municipal code: FS163

Mohokare Municipality (Sotho: Masepala wa Mohokare; Xhosa: uMasipala wase Mohokare) is a local municipality within the Xhariep District Municipality, in the Free State province of South Africa. Mohokare is the Sesotho word for the Caledon River, which runs through the municipality.

== Main places ==
The 2011 census divided the municipality into the following main places:

Place	Code	Area (km^{2})	Population	Most spoken language
Goedemoed		6.04	537	Afrikaans
Matlakeng		2.97	13,714	Sotho
Mofulatshepe		1.39	3,584	Sotho
Roleleathunya		2.99	5,955	Sotho
Rouxville		17.02	1,355	Sotho
Smithfield		34.11	1,195	Sotho
Zastron		19.73	1,893	Sotho
Remainder of the municipality		8,691/73	5,912	Sotho

== Politics ==
The municipal council consists of eleven members elected by mixed-member proportional representation. Six councillors are elected by first-past-the-post voting in six wards, while the remaining five are chosen from party lists so that the total number of party representatives is proportional to the number of votes received.

In the 2026 South African municipal elections the African National Congress (ANC) lost its majority, but still held the most seats on the council with six.

The following table shows the results of the 2026 election.

Party	Ward			List			Total seats
Party	Votes	%	Seats	Votes	%	Seats	Total seats
African National Congress	4,953	46.97	5	4,962	47.00	1	6
Democratic Alliance	3,049	28.91	2	3,106	29.42	2	4
Economic Freedom Fighters	1,543	14.63	0	1,559	14.77	2	2
Freedom Front Plus	749	7.10	0	773	7.32	1	1
Independent candidates	88	0.83	0				0
5 other parties	163	1.55	0	158	1.50	0	0
Total	10,545	100.00	7	10,558	100.00	6	13
Valid votes	10,545	97.72		10,558	97.89		
Invalid/blank votes	246	2.28		228	2.11		
Total votes	10,791	100.00		10,786	100.00		
Registered voters/turnout	19,934	54.13		19,934	54.11		

== Financial mismanagement ==
In January 2025, the municipality was listed as one of the top ten municipalities in arrears on their pension contributions.
