= Zastron =

- Location within Free State (South African province) Location within South Africa
- Coordinates: 30°18′S 27°05′E
- Country: South Africa
- Province: Free State
- District: Xhariep
- Municipality: Mohokare
- Established: 1875

Government
  - Type: Municipality
  - Mayor: Zingisa Mgauli (ANC)

Area
  - Total: 22.7 km^{2} (8.8 sq mi)

Population (2011)
  - Total: 15,607
  - Density: 688/km^{2} (1,780/sq mi)

Racial makeup (2011)
  - Black African: 94.8%
  - Coloured: 0.6%
  - Indian/Asian: 0.4%
  - White: 4.1%
  - Other: 0.1%

First languages (2011)
  - Sotho: 69.2%
  - Xhosa: 22.4%
  - Afrikaans: 5.1%
  - Other: 3.3%
- Time zone: UTC+2 (SAST)
- Postal code (street): 9950
- PO box: 9950
- Area code: 051; Farm lines: 05542

Zastron is a small agricultural town in the Free State province of South Africa, some 30 km from the border of Lesotho. It is situated at the foot of Aasvoëlberg (Vulture Mountain), named for the rare Cape vultures attracted by a feeding project a short distance out of town. The township is named "Matlakeng", Sesotho for Vultures. A curious rock formation in the mountain, Die Oog (The Eye), has been adopted as the town's unofficial emblem.

The town was founded in 1875 on the farm Verliesfontein, and named after the maiden name of President Brand's wife, Johanna Sibella Brand, née Zastron.

== Notable people ==
- David Rabin (1934-1984), university endocrinology professor
- Steyn von Rönge (*1955), farmer, politician and President of the Afrikaner Weerstandsbeweging (AWB)
- Lucas Majozi DCM (1916-1969) Stretch-bearer during the Second World War
