= Xhariep District Municipality =

Xhariep
- District municipality
- Seal

- Location of Xhariep District Municipality within Free State
- Coordinates: 30°01′S 25°46′E
- Country: South Africa
- Province: Free State
- Seat: Trompsburg
- Local municipalities: List: Letsemeng; Kopanong; Mohokare; Naledi

Government
  - Type: Municipal council
  - Mayor: Irene Mehlomekhulu

Area
  - Total: 37,674 km^{2} (14,546 sq mi)

Population (2011)
  - Total: 146,259
  - Density: 3.8822/km^{2} (10.055/sq mi)

Racial makeup (2011)
  - Black African: 78.5%
  - Coloured: 13.2%
  - Indian/Asian: 0.4%
  - White: 7.6%

First languages (2011)
  - Sotho: 45.3%
  - Afrikaans: 31.6%
  - Xhosa: 15.8%
  - Tswana: 3.5%
  - Other: 3.8%
- Time zone: UTC+2 (SAST)
- Municipal code: DC16

The Xhariep District Municipality (Sotho: Masepala wa Setereke wa Xhariep; Afrikaans: Xhariep-distriksmunisipaliteit; Xhosa: uMasipala weSithili sase Xhariep) is one of the 5 districts of the Free State province of South Africa. The municipality is the largest in the Free State geographically and is known for its vast land. It is home to the largest dam in the county, the Gariep Dam, and has two mines, situated in Jagersfontein and Koffiefontein. The natural resources and the geographical position of the municipality make it a site with good potential for investment and development. The seat is Trompsburg. As of 2011, the largest language group is Sotho who make up 45.3% of the total population of 146,259. The district code is DC16.

== Geography ==
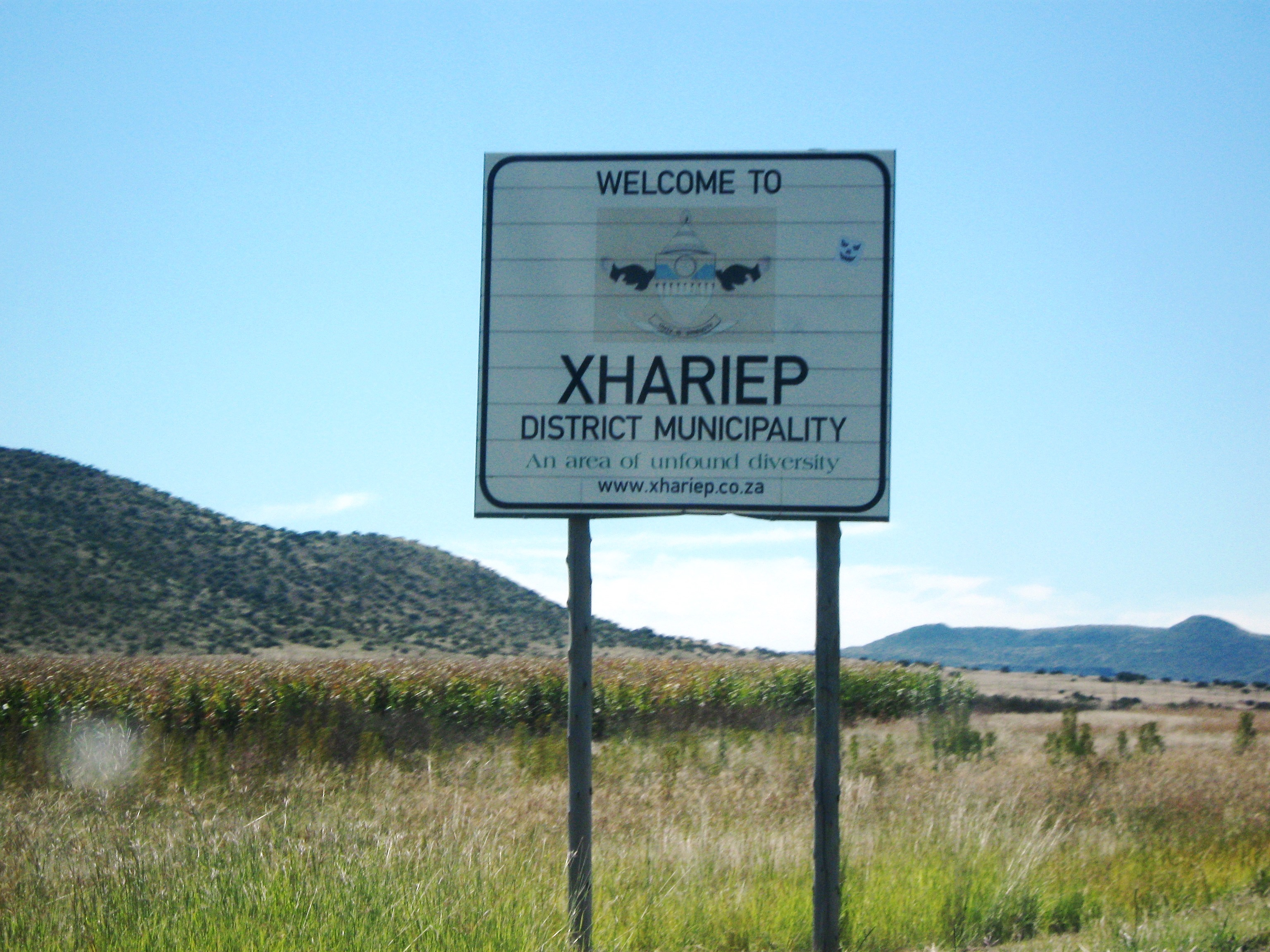
Welcoming sign where the Orange River is crossed in the direction of the Xhariep District Municipality

=== Neighbours ===
Xhariep is surrounded by:

- Lejweleputswa to the north (DC18)
- Mangaung Metro to the north-east
- The kingdom of Lesotho to the east
- Joe Gqabi District in Eastern Cape to the south (DC14)
- Pixley ka Seme in Northern Cape to the west (DC7)
- Frances Baard in Northern Cape to the north-west (DC9)

=== Local municipalities ===
The district contains the following local municipalities:

Local municipality	Population	%	Dominant language
Kopanong	49 171	33.6%	Sotho, Afrikaans
Letsemeng	38 628	26.4%	Afrikaans
Mohokare	34 146	23.4%	Sotho
Naledi	24 314	16.6%	Sotho

== Demographics ==
The following statistics are from the 2011 census.

Language	Population	%
Sotho	64 536	45.32%
Afrikaans	44 942	31.56%
Xhosa	22 518	15.81%
Tswana	5 000	3.51%
English	2 282	1.60%
Sign language	1 083	0.76%
Zulu, Ndebele, Swati	874	0.60%
Other	691	0.49%
Northern Sotho	260	0.18%

=== Gender ===
Gender	Population	%
Female	74 600	51.01%
Male	71 658	48.99%

=== Ethnic groups ===
Ethnic group	Population	%
Black African	114 806	78.49%
Coloured	19 239	13.15%
White	11 143	7.62%
Indian/Asian	553	0.38%

=== Age ===
Age	Population	%
000 - 004	13 216	9.77%
005 - 009	14 640	10.82%
010 - 014	15 613	11.54%
015 - 019	14 962	11.06%
020 - 024	11 708	8.66%
025 - 029	10 584	7.83%
030 - 034	10 002	7.40%
035 - 039	8 952	6.62%
040 - 044	7 742	5.72%
045 - 049	6 487	4.80%
050 - 054	5 534	4.09%
055 - 059	4 175	3.09%
060 - 064	3 784	2.80%
065 - 069	3 007	2.22%
070 - 074	1 898	1.40%
075 - 079	1 290	0.95%
080 - 084	970	0.72%
085 - 089	444	0.33%
090 - 094	157	0.12%
095 - 099	62	0.05%
100 plus	26	0.02%

== Politics ==
=== Election results ===
Election results for Xhariep in the South African general election, 2004.

- Population 18 and over: 82 604 [61.07% of total population]
- Total votes: 43 082 [31.85% of total population]
- Voting % estimate: 52.15% votes as a % of population 18 and over

Party	Votes	%
African National Congress	34 697	80.54%
Democratic Alliance	4 368	10.14%
Freedom Front Plus	1 021	2.37%
African Christian Democratic Party	749	1.74%
Pan African Congress	718	1.67%
New National Party	439	1.02%
Independent Democrats	321	0.75%
United Democratic Movement	183	0.42%
Inkhata Freedom Party	94	0.22%
United Christian Democratic Party	81	0.19%
Azanian People's Organisation	80	0.19%
UF	78	0.18%
NA	66	0.15%
SOPA	50	0.12%
EMSA	31	0.07%
CDP	28	0.06%
TOP	27	0.06%
PJC	27	0.06%
NLP	11	0.03%
Minority Front	7	0.02%
KISS	6	0.01%
Total	43 082	100.00%
