= Mangaung Metropolitan Municipality =

Coordinates: 29.1000°S 26.2167°E

Mangaung Bloemfontein
- Metropolitan municipality
- Mangaung Metropolitan Municipality
- Seal

- Location in the Free State
- Country: South Africa
- Province: Free State
- Seat: Bloemfontein
- Wards: 51

Government
  - Type: Municipal council
  - Mayor: Gregory Nthatisi (ANC)

Area
  - Total: 9,886 km^{2} (3,817 sq mi)

Population (2022)
  - Total: 811,431
  - Density: 82.08/km^{2} (212.6/sq mi)

Racial makeup (2022)
  - Black African: 87.9%
  - Coloured: 3.8%
  - Indian/Asian: 0.4%
  - White: 7.8%

First languages (2011)
  - Sotho: 53.3%
  - Afrikaans: 16.2%
  - Tswana: 12.6%
  - Xhosa: 9.9%
  - Other: 8%
- Time zone: UTC+2 (SAST)
- Municipal code: MAN

The Mangaung Metropolitan Municipality (Sotho: Masepala o Moholo wa Mangaung; Zulu: UMasipala weDolobhakazi laseMangawunge; Afrikaans: Mangaung Metropolitaanse Munisipaliteit; Tswana: Mmasepala wa Toropokgolo ya Mangaung; Xhosa: uMasipala oMbaxa wase Mangaung) is a metropolitan municipality which governs Bloemfontein and surrounding towns in the Free State province of South Africa. Mangaung is a Sesotho word meaning "place of cheetahs", as it was not uncommon for the Basotho to name warrior regiments after ferocious animals.

In the election of 4 November 2026 no party obtained a majority. The African National Congress (ANC) received the most seats, with thirty-five.

== History ==
Mangaung was established in 2000 as a local municipality within the Motheo District Municipality. At the municipal elections of 18 May 2011, Mangaung was converted into a metropolitan municipality. At the municipal elections of 3 August 2016, the Naledi Local Municipality was incorporated into Mangaung. This 2016 merge increased Mangaung's land area from 6,284 square kilometres (2,426 mi^{2}) to 9,886 square kilometres (3,817 mi^{2}), making it the largest of the eight metropolitan municipalities in South Africa.

== Main places ==
The 2001 census divided the municipality into the following main places:

Place	Code	Area (km^{2})	Population	Most spoken language
Barolong Baga Moroka	40501	911.66	8,556	Sotho
Bloemfontein	40502	287.46	111,697	Afrikaans
Botshabelo	40503	228.79	175,822	Sotho
Mangaung	40504	46.23	217,076	Sotho
Morago	40505	221.37	3,941	Tswana
Opkoms	40506	2.84	15,397	Afrikaans
Peter Swart	40507	1.97	10,002	Sotho
Rodenbeck	40508	2.05	7,837	Sotho
Sonskyn	40509	0.80	3,630	Sotho
Thaba 'Nchu	40510	216.23	67,269	Sotho
Remainder of the municipality	40511	4,364.11	24,220	Sotho

== Politics ==
The municipal council consists of one hundred-and-one members elected by mixed-member proportional representation. Fifty-one councillors are elected by first-past-the-post voting in fifty-one wards, while the remaining fifty are chosen from party lists so that the total number of party representatives is proportional to the number of votes received.

In the election of 4 November 2026 no party obtained a majority. The African National Congress (ANC) received the most seats, with thirty-five.

The following table shows the results of the election.

Party	Ward			List			Total seats
Party	Votes	%	Seats	Votes	%	Seats	Total seats
African National Congress	75,100	33.56	35	77,006	34.25	0	35
Democratic Alliance	74,671	33.37	14	75,554	33.61	20	34
Economic Freedom Fighters	18,966	8.47	1	19,587	8.71	8	9
Freedom Front Plus	13,300	5.94	0	13,270	5.90	6	6
Patriotic Alliance	9,912	4.43	1	9,557	4.25	3	4
ActionSA	5,597	2.50	0	6,605	2.94	3	3
South African Communist Party	3,802	1.70	0	3,257	1.45	2	2
National Service Delivery Forum	2,692	1.20	0	2,501	1.11	1	1
African Transformation Movement	1,994	0.89	0	2,158	0.96	1	1
African Cultural Identity Movement	2,078	0.93	0	1,920	0.85	1	1
uMkhonto weSizwe Party	1,973	0.88	0	1,953	0.87	1	1
Afrikan Alliance of Social Democrats	1,413	0.63	0	1,421	0.63	1	1
Mangaung Seven People's Voice	1,374	0.61	0	1,291	0.57	1	1
African Independent Congress	1,391	0.62	0	758	0.34	1	1
African Christian Democratic Party	1,023	0.46	0	1,098	0.49	1	1
Independent candidates	1,695	0.76	0				0
18 other parties	6,807	3.04	0	6,888	3.06	0	0
Total	223,788	100.00	51	224,824	100.00	50	101
Valid votes	223,788	98.03		224,824	97.98		
Invalid/blank votes	4,499	1.97		4,632	2.02		
Total votes	228,287	100.00		229,456	100.00		
Registered voters/turnout	447,397	51.03		447,397	51.29		

== Maladministration ==
Since April 2022, the municipality is under administration, one of 32 in the country, and three in the Free State where the provincial executive has intervened due to maladministration.

== Mayors of Mangaung ==
The following people have served as the Executive Mayor of the municipality since its founding in 2000:

- Pappi Mokoena (ANC), 2001–2005
- Eva Moiloa (acting) (ANC), 2005–2006
- Gertrude Mothupi (ANC), 2006–2008
- France Kosinyane "Playfair" Morule (ANC), 2008–2011
- Thabo Manyoni (ANC), 2011–2016
- Olly Mlamleli (ANC), 2016–2020
- Lebohang Masoetsa (acting) (ANC), 2020–16 August 2021
- Mxolisi Siyonzana (ANC), 16 August 2021–6 March 2023
- Papi Mokoena (AASD), 14 April 2023 – 20 April 2023
- Gregory Nthatisi (ANC), 13 October 2023 – present (acting since 26 April 2023)
