= Malaoaneng =

- Community Council
- Geographic Center of Community
- Coordinates: 28°55′11″S 28°14′17″E
- Country: Lesotho
- District: Leribe District
- Elevation: 5,869 ft (1,789 m)

Population (2006)
  - Total: 5,864
- Time zone: UTC+2 (CAT)
- Coordinates computed from Lesotho Villages file.

Malaoaneng is a community council located in the Leribe District of Lesotho. Its population in 2006 was 5,864.

== Villages ==
The community of Malaoaneng includes the villages of Betha-Betha, Boiketlo (Ha Seetsa), Chache, Ha Abiele, Ha Abiele (Papala), Ha Chachole, Ha Machobane, Ha Makhetloane, Ha Makuka, Ha Malefane, Ha Matsoso, Ha Mpoche, Ha Ntja, Ha Paka, Ha Ramokoinihi, Ha Ratulo, Ha Roelane, Ha Sepono, Hlokoa-Le-Monate, Kanana, Komeng, Letlapeng, Litaung, Matebeleng, Mohlomong (Ha Seetsa), Motse-Mocha (Ha Seetsa), Patuoe (Ha Makuka), Shebang, Tiping and Tutulung.
