= Ha Chachole =

- Location in Lesotho
- Coordinates: 28°55′32.9046″S 28°17′27.6252″E
- Country: Lesotho
- Prefecture: Leribe
- Community Council: Malaoaneng
- Elevation: 6,437 ft (1,962 m)
- Time zone: UTC+2 (Southern Africa Time)

Ha Chachole is a village in Malaoaneng community council, Leribe district, Lesotho. It is located at around 28°55′32.9046″S 28°17′27.6252″E, in the elevation of around 1962 metres.

== Climate ==
Ha Chachole has a Subtropical highland climate (Cwb) with dry, cold winters and wet, warm summers.

Climate data for Ha Chachole
Month	Jan	Feb	Mar	Apr	May	Jun	Jul	Aug	Sep	Oct	Nov	Dec	Year
Mean daily maximum °C (°F)	25.4 (77.7)	24.6 (76.3)	23.2 (73.8)	20.5 (68.9)	17.5 (63.5)	14.2 (57.6)	14.5 (58.1)	16.7 (62.1)	19.5 (67.1)	21.9 (71.4)	23.1 (73.6)	24.7 (76.5)	20.5 (68.9)
Daily mean °C (°F)	18.6 (65.5)	18.1 (64.6)	16.5 (61.7)	13.4 (56.1)	9.8 (49.6)	6.6 (43.9)	6.8 (44.2)	9.1 (48.4)	12.4 (54.3)	15 (59)	16.4 (61.5)	18 (64)	13.4 (56.1)
Mean daily minimum °C (°F)	11.9 (53.4)	11.6 (52.9)	9.8 (49.6)	6.3 (43.3)	2.1 (35.8)	−1 (30)	−0.8 (30.6)	1.6 (34.9)	5.4 (41.7)	8.1 (46.6)	9.7 (49.5)	11.3 (52.3)	6.3 (43.4)
Average precipitation mm (inches)	129 (5.1)	116 (4.6)	109 (4.3)	65 (2.6)	32 (1.3)	14 (0.6)	15 (0.6)	24 (0.9)	42 (1.7)	98 (3.9)	116 (4.6)	130 (5.1)	890 (35.3)
Source: Climate-Data.org
