= List of cities in Lesotho =

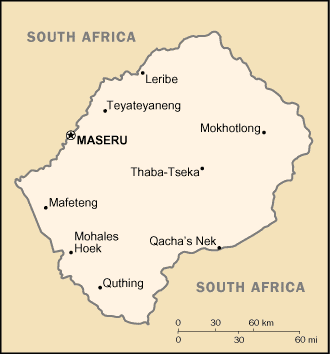
Map of Lesotho

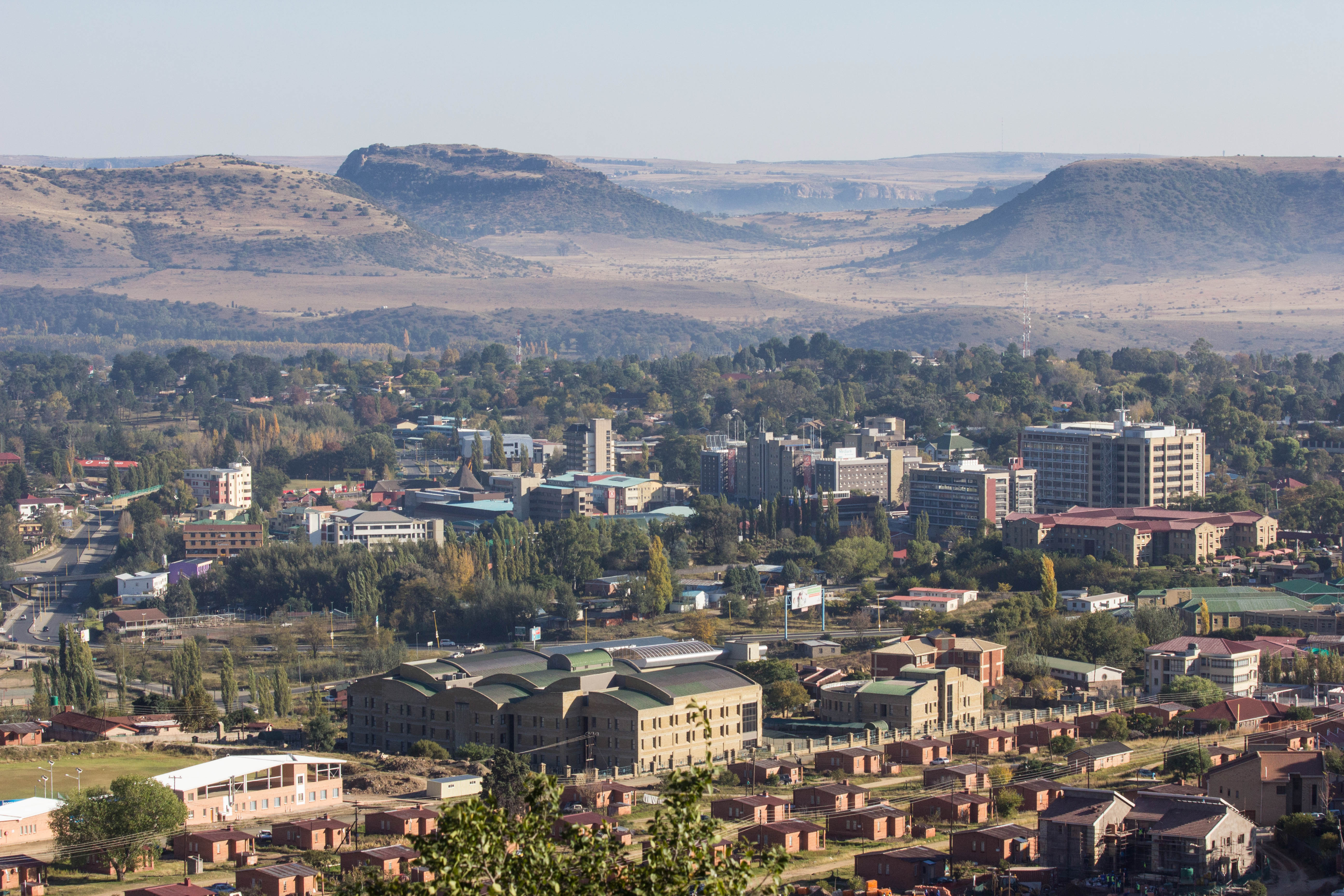
Maseru, Capital of Lesotho

The following is a list of cities in the Kingdom of Lesotho:

== List ==
Cities in Lesotho
Rank	City	Population			District
Rank	City	Census 1986	Census 1996	Census 2016	District
1.	Maseru	98,017	137,837	330,760	Maseru
2.	Teyateyaneng	24,336	48,869	75,115	Berea
3.	Mafeteng	12,598	20,804	39,754	Mafeteng
4.	Hlotse	8,021	23,122	38,558	Leribe
5.	Mohale's Hoek	7,899	17,871	40,040	Mohale's Hoek
6.	Maputsoe	8,267	27,951	55,541	Leribe
7.	Qacha's Nek	4,589	4,797	15,917	Qacha's Nek
8.	Quthing	4,471	9,858	27,314	Quthing
9.	Butha-Buthe	7,509	12,611	35,108	Butha-Buthe
10.	Mokhotlong	2,257	4,275	12,940	Mokhotlong
11.	Thaba-Tseka	2,127	4,449	15,248	Thaba-Tseka
