= Malealea =

- Village
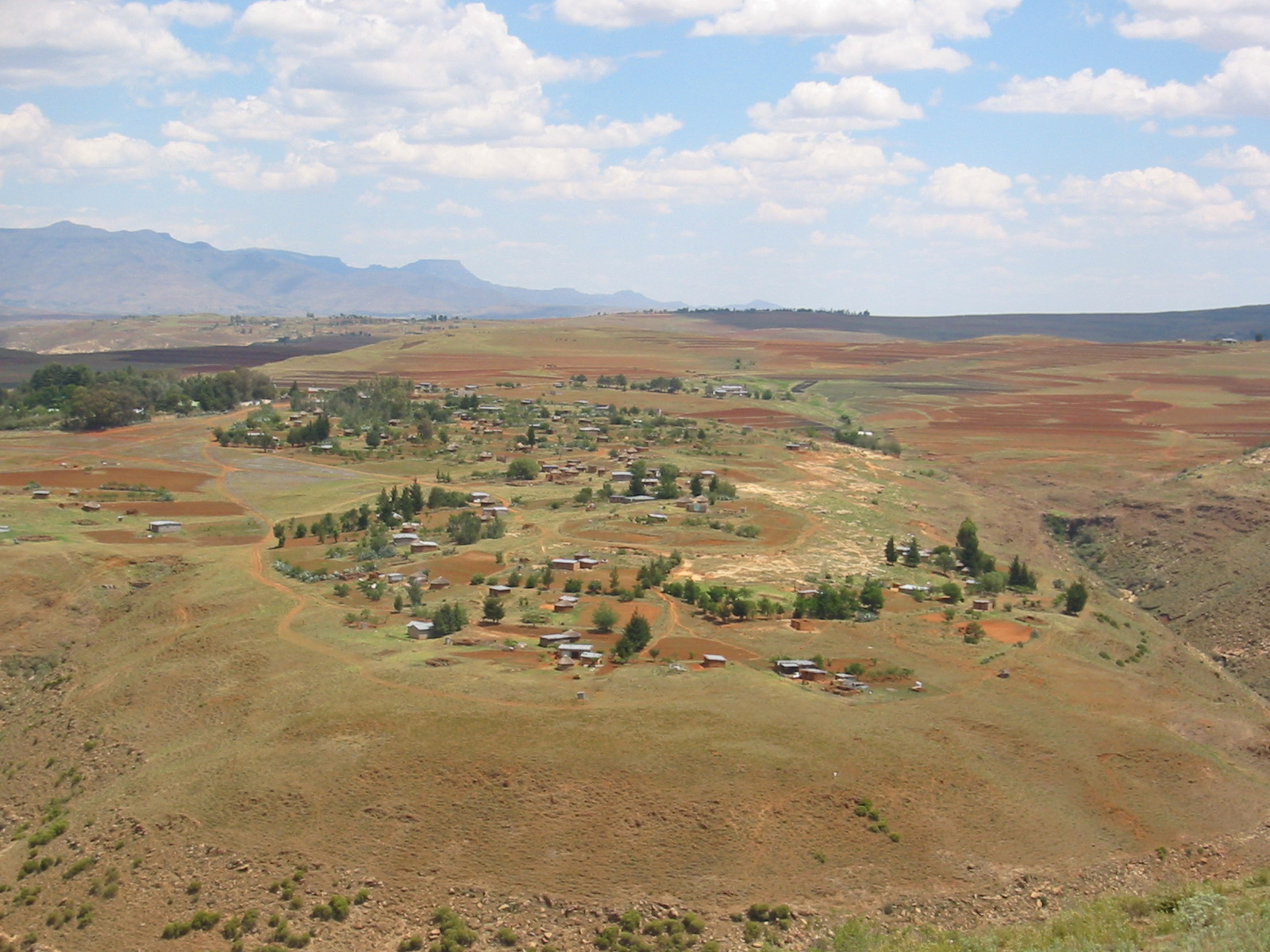
- Malealea: Malealea is situated in a remote part of Western Lesotho

- Location within Lesotho
- Coordinates: 29°49′44.5″S 27°35′58.5″E
- Country: Lesotho
- District: Mafeteng District
- Community council: 'Malakeng
- Elevation _ca.: 5,900 ft (1,800 m)

Population (2006)
  - Total: 613
- Time zone: UTC+2 (CAT)

Malealea is a village in the Mafeteng district, roughly 80km from Maseru in southern Lesotho. Located in the Makhaleng valley, ca. 3 kilometers west of the mouth of Botsoela river. The village can be reached from Matelile over 7 km gravel road. The 2006 census counts 613 inhabitants in "Makhomalong (Malealea)" and "Letlapeng (Malealea)"

== History ==
- Rock paintings show that the area was inhabited by the San people.
- Between 1900 and the First World War, the English Mervyn Smith opened a trading station.
- In 1986, the trading station was bought by Mick and Di Jones and gradually transformed into a lodge.

== Development ==
The Malealea Development Trust is a community run non-profit that strives to address the health, educational and environmental challenges faced by the Malealea community. Alongside its work to promote community involvement in tourism, the trust executes various activities and interventions in the priority areas of 1) Orphans and Vulnerable Children (OVCs) 2) Health and Well-being 3) Education and Training 4) General Community Development which includes income generation and environmental management.

== Culture ==
=== Music ===
The neo-traditional band Sotho Sounds are from Malealea. They perform regularly at Malealea Lodge.
