= Monyetleng =

- Community Council
- Geographic Center of Community
- Coordinates: 29°38′07″S 28°53′06″E
- Country: Lesotho
- District: Thaba-Tseka District
- Elevation: 7,162 ft (2,183 m)

Population (2006)
  - Total: 7,306
- Time zone: UTC+2 (CAT)
- Coordinates computed from Lesotho Villages file.

Monyetleng is a community council located in the Thaba-Tseka District of Lesotho. Its population in 2006 was 7,306.

== Villages ==
The community of Monyetleng includes the villages of Bolia-'Mele, Botsola, Ha 'Mankereu, Ha Boomo, Ha K'henene, Ha Khanyetsi, Ha Komanyane, Ha Mokone, Ha Motake, Ha Motjolopane, Ha Motsoetsoe, Ha Rampeoane, Ha Seeiso, Ha Seelane, Ha Setala, Ha Teke (Hloahloeng), Ha Theko, Kh'olola, Khatoloto, Khochaneng, Khotsong, Kolobere, Lekhalong (Moreneng), Linotšing, Matsiring, Mokhoabong, Nokeng, Phahameng, Pontšeng and Taung.
