= Senotong =

- Community Council
- Geographic Center of Community
- Coordinates: 29°18′43″S 28°38′24″E
- Country: Lesotho
- District: Thaba-Tseka District
- Elevation: 7,953 ft (2,424 m)

Population (2006)
  - Total: 7,742
- Time zone: UTC+2 (CAT)
- Coordinates computed from Lesotho Villages file.

Senotong is a community council located in the Thaba-Tseka District of Lesotho. Its population in 2006 was 7,742.

== Villages ==
The community of Senotong includes the villages of Bahaleng, Bahaoleng, Foreisetata, Ha Kalakatana, Ha Lekiba, Ha Maramane, Ha Matona, Ha Mokhantši, Ha Mokoto, Ha Pene, Ha Rahlena, Ha Ratau, Ha Sekila, Ha Thene, Ha Tiela, Ha Tlelase, Ha Toeba, Iketleng, Kholoang, Kholong, Lekhalong, Lihloahloeng, Linotšing, Lioling, Liseleng, Litšoeneng, Maforeisetateng, Maiseng, Makhalong, Manganeng, Maqhoane, Mathueleng, Matikeng, Matsoapong, Meseeaneng, Mohloling, Mononong, Peteletsa, Phakoeng, Pontšeng, Ranthoto, Sekhutlong, Sekolopata, Sephokong, Taung, Thaba-Bosiu and Tšoeu-Khala.
