= Matsooana =

Thaban'a Mahlanya
- Community council
- Geographic Center of Community
- Coordinates: 29°31′57″S 28°34′39″E
- Country: Lesotho
- District: Thaba-Tseka District
- Elevation: 8,010 ft (2,440 m)

Population (2006)
  - Total: 14,416
- Time zone: UTC+2 (CAT)
- Coordinates computed from Lesotho Villages file.

Thaban'a Mahlanya is a community council located in the Thaba-Tseka District of Lesotho. Its population in 2006 was 14,416.

== Villages ==
The community of Thaban'a Mahlanya includes the villages of Ha Laka, Ha Majara, Ha Moeko, Ha Moqekela, Ha Motsepa, Ha Motsoloane, Ha Mphafi, Ha Mpora, Ha Phaila, Ha Ramalapi, Ha Rantsimana, Ha Rasebate, Ha Sephooko, Hillside, Khomo-ea-Leburu, Lingoareng, Liphokoaneng, Majakaneng, Maqethong, Mohlakeng, Patisi, Phomolong, Pontšeng, Projecteng, Sekiring, Thabana Mahlanya, Thabong, Thabong II and Topa.
