= Mosetoa =

Khohlo-Ntso
- Community Council
- Geographic Center of Community
- Coordinates: 29°24′32″S 28°33′41″E
- Country: Lesotho
- District: Thaba-Tseka District
- Elevation: 7,274 ft (2,217 m)

Population (2006)
  - Total: 7,264
- Time zone: UTC+2 (CAT)
- Coordinates computed from Lesotho Villages file.

Khohlo-Ntso is a community council located in the Thaba-Tseka District of Lesotho. Its population in 2006 was 7,264.

== Villages ==
The community of Khohlo-Ntso includes the villages of Baruting, Beresi, Ha Khoanyane, Ha Lefa, Ha Molefi (Sosolo), Ha Monare (Marakeng), Ha Mothibe, Ha Motsosi, Ha Noko, Ha Ntšeke, Ha Sebetoane, Ha Sekhohola, Ha Soai, Ha Tlolo-Tlolo, Lebenkeleng, Libareng, Machoaboleng, Makhongoaneng, Mapolateng, Motse-Mocha, Motsekuoa, Pontšeng, Tsekong and Tsieng (Ha Leoka).
