= Linakaneng =

- Community Council
- Geographic Center of Community
- Coordinates: 29°28′25″S 28°57′10″E
- Country: Lesotho
- District: Mokhotlong District
- Elevation: 9,767 ft (2,977 m)

Population (2006)
  - Total: 4,452
- Time zone: UTC+2 (CAT)
- Coordinates computed from Lesotho Villages file.

Linakaneng is a community council located in the Mokhotlong District of Lesotho. Its population in 2006 was 4,452.

== Villages ==
The community of Linakaneng includes the villages of Boiketlo, Boinyatso, Chesalaene, Ha Matjota, Ha Moepanyane, Ha Mosollane, Ha Polaki, Ha Sekoti, Ha Soai, Khorong, Khubetsoana, Likotjaneng, Makula-Peea, Manganeng, Mankeng, Maphatsing, Meeling, Mohloaing, Mokotleng, Moreneng, Mothating, Motse-Mocha, Motsitseng, Nokeng, Rosemane, Sekokong, Tlohang and Tsatsanyane.
