= Marung =

- Community Council
- Geographic Center of Community
- Coordinates: 29°26′23″S 28°52′33″E
- Country: Lesotho
- District: Mokhotlong District
- Elevation: 8,010 ft (2,440 m)

Population (2006)
  - Total: 5,458
- Time zone: UTC+2 (CAT)
- Coordinates computed from Lesotho Villages file.

Marung is a community council located in the Mokhotlong District of Lesotho. Its population in 2006 was 5,458.

== Villages ==
The community of Marung includes the villages of Bobatsi, Botha-Bothe, Ha Khorole, Ha Liete, Ha Makaka, Ha Mathibela, Ha Moeketsane, Ha Mohai, Ha Mokoena, Ha Mokotjo, Ha Moleko, Ha Ntsika, Ha Ralitlhare, Ha Roelane, Ha Setoko, Ha Sibi, Ha Taelo, Ha Tšoeu, Khoaba-lea-oela, Koma-Koma, Lifatjaneng, Lifofaneng, Lihareseng, Lilatoleng, Mafikeng, Mafisoaneng, Makorotong, Mamothapeng, Mapokising, Meeling, Moeaneng, Motse-mocha, Phahameng, Taung and Tsekong.
