= Liphamola =

- Community Council
- Geographic Center of Community
- Coordinates: 29°17′34″S 29°02′54″E
- Country: Lesotho
- District: Mokhotlong District
- Elevation: 8,018 ft (2,444 m)

Population (2006)
  - Total: 8,215
- Time zone: UTC+2 (CAT)
- Coordinates computed from Lesotho Villages file.

Liphamola is a community council located in the Mokhotlong District of Lesotho. Its population in 2006 was 8,215.

== Villages ==
The community of Liphamola includes the villages of Airport, Chaba-se-maketse, Checha, Ha Kotsiea, Ha Mojakisane, Ha Seeiso (Thabang), Kamor'a-Lekhalo, Koporasi, Lecop, Mangaung, Mapoleseng, Matamong, Matebeleng, Motse-mocha, Ntlholohetsane, Phuthalichaba, Salang, Sepetlele and Thaba-Bosiu.
