= Matsoku =

- Community Council
- Geographic Center of Community
- Coordinates: 29°10′12″S 28°39′25″E
- Country: Lesotho
- District: Mokhotlong District
- Elevation: 7,949 ft (2,423 m)

Population (2006)
  - Total: 4,715
- Time zone: UTC+2 (CAT)
- Coordinates computed from Lesotho Villages file.

Matsoku is a community council located in the Mokhotlong District of Lesotho. Its population in 2006 was 4,715.

== Villages ==
The community of Matsoku includes the villages of Ha Hlolo, Ha Khosi, Ha Leohla, Ha Mafonyoko, Ha Makhabane, Ha Manyakane, Ha Meno, Ha Mokoto, Ha Molapo (Thepung), Ha Mosisi, Ha Nthele, Ha Phepheng, Ha Rachele, Ha Ralithebe, Ha Senkhane, Ha Thelelisane, Ha Tšekelo, Liseleng, Ha 'Makhoana, K'hangela, Khubetsoana, Kutukutu, Ha Sekutlu, Lerakoaneng, Likhutlong, Linotšing, Liramong, Litenteng, Maboea, Mahonyeling, Makhapung, Makhoana, Masiteng, Ha Seshote, Ha 'Makhoana, Matsatsaneng, Mongobong, Mosifaneng, Ntširele, Pitseng, Postola, Sekhutlong, Khopung, Sekokoaneng and Thaba-Chitja.
