= Whitehill, Lesotho =

White-Hill
- Community Council
- Geographic Center of Community
- Coordinates: 30°06′09″S 28°27′44″E
- Country: Lesotho
- District: Qacha's Nek District
- Elevation: 6,460 ft (1,969 m)

Population (2006)
  - Total: 3,197
- Time zone: UTC+2 (CAT)
- Coordinates computed from Lesotho Villages file.

White-Hill is a community council located in the Qacha's Nek District of Lesotho. Its population in 2006 was 3,197.

== Villages ==
The community of White-Hill includes the villages of Bolahla, Ha 'Mantilane, Ha Jobo, Ha Jobo (Liforanteng), Ha Jobo (Masoabing), Ha Jobo (Phuthing), Ha Jobo (Tlokoeng), Ha Kaizer, Ha Kose, Ha Molalanyane, Ha Molikoa, Ha Mosesi, Ha Motlomelo, Ha Motselo, Ha Rankhala, Ha Rasehloho, Ha Rateronko, Ha Tontši, Khoalipane, Mankoaneng, Matebeleng, Motse-Mocha, Polasi, Rannatlaila, Sephokong and White-Hill.
