= Tekeseleng =

- Community Council
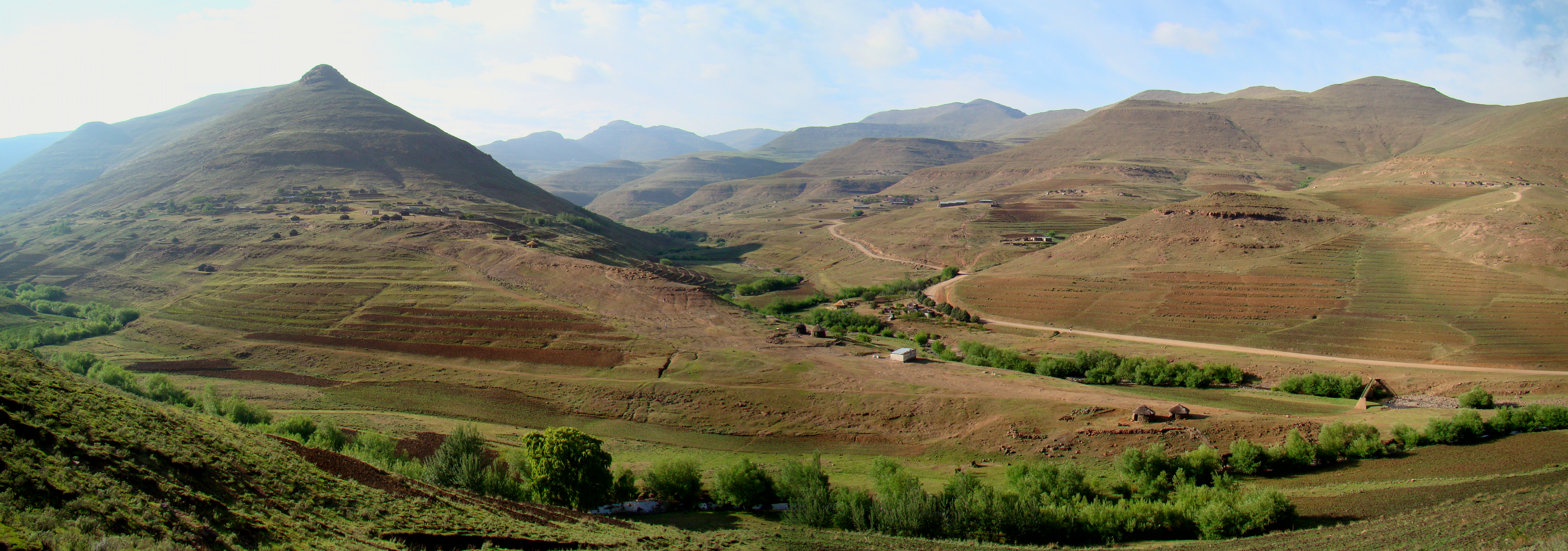
- A view of Matsoaing village and surroundings

- Geographic Center of Community
- Coordinates: 29°23′47″S 29°04′05″E
- Country: Lesotho
- District: Mokhotlong District
- Elevation: 8,609 ft (2,624 m)

Population (2006)
  - Total: 4,397
- Time zone: UTC+2 (CAT)
- Coordinates computed from Lesotho Villages file.

Tekeseleng is a community council located in the Mokhotlong District of Lesotho. Its population in 2006 was 4,397.

== Villages ==
The community of Tekeseleng includes the villages of Boritsa, Ha Koenane, Ha Koeneho, Ha Mabina, Ha Maile, Ha Matsoejane, Ha Poho, Ha Setefane, Jemisetone, Lekhalong, Likoae, Linareng, Liparamiting, Liraoheleng, Makhapung, Malieketseng, Maputsoe, Masuoaneng, Matebeleng, Mathakheng, Matsoaing, Matsoijane, Thaba-Phatšoa, Tlapa-le-Putsoa and Tseko.
