= Sakeng =

- Community Council
- Geographic Center of Community
- Coordinates: 29°21′33″S 29°05′59″E
- Country: Lesotho
- District: Mokhotlong District
- Elevation: 7,438 ft (2,267 m)

Population (2006)
  - Total: 2,850
- Time zone: UTC+2 (CAT)
- Coordinates computed from Lesotho Villages file.

Sakeng is a community council located in the Mokhotlong District of Lesotho. Its population in 2006 was 2,850.

== Villages ==
The community of Sakeng includes the villages of Ha Liphate, Ha Mojakisane, Ha Mokone, Ha Mpiti, Ha Senepi, Ha Thamane, Khohloaneng, Khohlong, Khohlong (Ha Mokone), Kokomala, Liphakoeng, Maboloka, Malakabeng, Manyofaneng, Mapeleng and Thoteng.
