= Rafolatsane =

- Community Council
- Geographic Center of Community
- Coordinates: 29°21′17″S 28°54′39″E
- Country: Lesotho
- District: Mokhotlong District
- Elevation: 9,193 ft (2,802 m)

Population (2006)
  - Total: 7,713
- Time zone: UTC+2 (CAT)
- Coordinates computed from Lesotho Villages file.

Rafolatsane is a community council located in the Mokhotlong District of Lesotho. Its population in 2006 was 7,713.

== Villages ==
The community of Rafolatsane includes the villages of Bochabela, Bokone, Ha Bulara, Ha Janteu, Ha Lehlohonolo, Ha Mofali, Ha Mosenki, Ha Motebang, Ha Motšeare (Chesa), Ha Motšeare (Tilimaneng), Ha Ntsebele, Ha Phate, Ha Phatoli, Ha Rafolatsane, Ha Ramaleshoane, Ha Setsoto, Hlomohang, Lekhalong, Letsatseng, Libekoaneng, Libibing, Likhameng, Liphokong, Mabeutung, Majakaneng, Maluba-lube, Mamphaneng, Manganeng, Maotleng, Masofeng, Masokong, Matlakeng, Matsekeng, Meeling, Mochochononong, Moeaneng, Molalana, Molumong, Motebang, Namoha, Nkokomale, Nqobelle, Sakaneng, Sekokong, Thajana, Thlakoaneng, Thoteng and Tšepeng.
