= Letloepe =

- Community Council
- Geographic Center of Community
- Coordinates: 30°05′43″S 28°39′48″E
- Country: Lesotho
- District: Qacha's Nek District
- Elevation: 5,719 ft (1,743 m)

Population (2006)
  - Total: 14,527
- Time zone: UTC+2 (CAT)
- Coordinates computed from Lesotho Villages file.

Letloepe is a community council located in the Qacha's Nek District of Lesotho. Its population in 2006 was 14,527.

== Villages ==
The community of Letloepe includes the villages of

- F.T.C.
- Ha 'Mamosa
- Ha 'Manteko
- Ha Bolokoe
- Ha Hlapalimane
- Ha Maluma
- Ha Manteko
- Ha Mosola
- Ha Mphahama
- Ha Mpiti
- Ha Nkhahle
- Ha Noosi

- Ha Nqhoaki
- Ha Ramoeletsi
- Ha Ramoroke
- Ha Thaha
- Ha Tlali
- Hill-Side
- Keiting
- Leropong
- Lifofaneng
- Liqalabeng
- Liqhooeng

- Liqoqoeng
- Majakeng
- Makaoteng
- Makhalong
- Makhaola High School
- Malimong
- Mapheleng
- Matebeleng
- Matšela-Habeli
- Motse-Mocha
- Police Station

- Sekitsing
- Sepetlele-sa-Khale
- Terai Hoek
- Tereseng
- Thaba-Bosiu
- Thaba-Tšoeu
- Thifa
- TJ
- Tobotsa
- Topa
- White-City
