= Matebeng Council =

Matebeng
- Community Council
- Geographic Center of Community
- Coordinates: 29°50′41″S 28°52′25″E
- Country: Lesotho
- District: Qacha's Nek District
- Elevation: 7,927 ft (2,416 m)

Population (2006)
  - Total: 1,735
- Time zone: UTC+2 (CAT)
- Coordinates computed from Lesotho Villages file.

Matebeng is a community council located in the Qacha's Nek District of Lesotho. Its population in 2006 was 1,735.

== Villages ==
The community of Matebeng includes the villages of Ha Lelingoana (Ha Madala), Ha Lelingoana (Makhaleng), Ha Lelingoana (Moreneng), Ha Libete, Ha Mahamo, Ha Mofolo, Ha Nkofo, Ha Sefaha, Ha Tomose, Ha Tsolo, Ha Wana, Maphotong, Matlakeng and Mosamaqa.
