= Molika-Liko =

- Community Council
- Geographic Center of Community
- Coordinates: 29°05′31″S 28°59′53″E
- Country: Lesotho
- District: Mokhotlong District
- Elevation: 7,779 ft (2,371 m)

Population (2006)
  - Total: 6,239
- Time zone: UTC+2 (CAT)
- Coordinates computed from Lesotho Villages file.

Molika-Liko is a community council located in the Mokhotlong District of Lesotho. Its population in 2006 was 6,239.

== Villages ==
The community of Molika-Liko includes the villages of Bokhina-Pere, Ha Botsipane, Ha Molopo, Ha Monaheng, Ha Moroke, Ha Seema, Khonofaneng, Lehlakaneng, Lepatsong, Letlapeng, Linareng, Liotloaneng, Lithakong, Mabuleng, Mafulane, Mahausung, Makukutoaneng, Manyareleng, Marumong, Masheaneng, Matebeleng, Matlakeng, Matsatsaneng, Molikaliko, Ntsoana-tsatsi, Phatlalla, Phuthing, Pitsaneng, Rapeising, Sixteen, Taung, Teraeng, Thaba-li-mpe, Thabana-li-'Mele and Thoteng.
