= Popa, Lesotho =

Popa
- Community Council
- Geographic Center of Community
- Coordinates: 29°15′33″S 28°56′56″E
- Country: Lesotho
- District: Mokhotlong District
- Elevation: 8,182 ft (2,494 m)

Population (2006)
  - Total: 6,725
- Time zone: UTC+2 (CAT)
- Coordinates computed from Lesotho Villages file.

Popa is a community council located in the Mokhotlong District of Lesotho. Its population in 2006 was 6,725.

== Villages ==
The community of Popa includes the villages of Botsola, Ha Koatake, Ha Konki, Ha Lesoeja, Ha Letaba, Ha Letjama, Ha Mathibeli, Ha Nyoko, Ha Phohla, Ha Ramohale, Ha Tipi, Ha Tšese, Kanana, Kheseng, Khohlong, Lilimala, Lisaleng, Litšoeneng, Mabekong, Mabeleteng, Mabothong, Maitisi, Majakaneng, Makalong, Makaoteng, Makhalong, Makhomalong, Maqaseng, Masholoko, Matlobong, Matsoapong, Moeaneng, Moreneng, Paballong, Phokeng, Pontšeng, Sebothoane, Sekokong, Tlokoeng, Tsekong and Tšila-Ntšo.
