= Mateanong =

- Community Council
- Geographic Center of Community
- Coordinates: 29°21′16″S 29°13′07″E
- Country: Lesotho
- District: Mokhotlong District
- Elevation: 7,667 ft (2,337 m)

Population (2006)
  - Total: 7,387
- Time zone: UTC+2 (CAT)
- Coordinates computed from Lesotho Villages file.

Mateanong is a community council located in the Mokhotlong District of Lesotho. Its population in 2006 was 7,387.

== Villages ==
The community of Mateanong includes the villages of Boelang, Ha Jorose, Ha Leutsoa, Ha Malapane, Ha Maseru, Ha Mohale, Ha Pela, Kholokoe, Khomo-Khoana, Khutlo-Peli, Koeneng, Lentsoeteng, Letšeng, Linotšing, Liphocheng, Liqobong, Makoabating, Malefiloane, Manganeng, Mateanong, Matebeleng, Matlaong, Mechalleng, Meeling, Moeaneng, Mohlanapeng, Mokoekoe, Nazareth, Nkokamale, Ntširele, Patiseng, Qobellong, Ralefatla, Sekokong, Sephokong, Terai Hoek, Tlhakoaneng and Tšieng.
