= Ratšoleli =

- Community Council
- Geographic Center of Community
- Coordinates: 30°02′54″S 28°41′08″E
- Country: Lesotho
- District: Qacha's Nek District
- Elevation: 6,355 ft (1,937 m)

Population (2006)
  - Total: 6,633
- Time zone: UTC+2 (CAT)
- Coordinates computed from Lesotho Villages file.

Ratšoleli is a community council located in the Qacha's Nek District of Lesotho. Its population in 2006 was 6,633.

== Villages ==
The community of Ratšoleli includes the villages of Foreisetata, Ha Makhaola, Ha Matlali, Ha Moloko, Ha Mosuoe, Ha Rafatše, Ha Ratšoleli, Ha Rooijane, Ha Thaba, Ha Tšepiso, Kanana, Lehafing (Ha Matlali), Lekhalong, Likhohloaneng, Linokong, Mafikeng, Mankoaneng, Matebeng, Matsoetlane (Motalaneng), Pitseng, Sethebeng and Waterfall.
