= Thaba-Litšoene =

- Community Council
- Geographic Center of Community
- Coordinates: 29°58′22″S 28°49′07″E
- Country: Lesotho
- District: Qacha's Nek District
- Elevation: 9,259 ft (2,822 m)

Population (2006)
  - Total: 5,036
- Time zone: UTC+2 (CAT)
- Coordinates computed from Lesotho Villages file.

Thaba-Litšoene is a community council located in the Qacha's Nek District of Lesotho. Its population in 2006 was 5,036.

== Villages ==
The community of Thaba-Litšoene includes the villages of Ha 'Mapa, Ha Chale, Ha Isaka, Ha Khanya, Ha Khoathi, Ha Koatsi, Ha Lehata, Ha Makhooane, Ha Mathai, Ha Moalosi, Ha Mosebi, Ha Ntlama, Ha Nyatso, Ha Ramotheba, Ha Rasekoele, Ha Sepechele, Ha Thokoa, Ha Thube, Ha Totomayo, Ha Tšita, Ha Tsoene, Hohobeng, Khohlong, Kholokoe, Khubetsoana, Lepapaneng, Likileng, Liqaleng, Mahooeng, Malaong, Mapeleng, Mokhoabong, Thena, Thueleng and Tjopa.
