= Khubelu =

- Community Council
- Geographic Center of Community
- Coordinates: 29°16′46″S 28°46′40″E
- Country: Lesotho
- District: Mokhotlong District
- Elevation: 7,772 ft (2,369 m)

Population (2006)
  - Total: 8,690
- Time zone: UTC+2 (CAT)
- Coordinates computed from Lesotho Villages file.

Khubelu is a community council located in the Mokhotlong District of Lesotho. Its population was 8,690 as of 2006.

== Villages ==
The community of Khubelu includes the villages of

Foreisetata
Ha 'Maeu
Ha Hlohlo
Ha Letheha
Ha Maqhooana
Ha Matekase
Ha Mei
Ha Mphatsoane
Ha Mphuthi
Ha Nthuseng
Ha Phera
Ha Poone
Ha Ralitsepe
Ha Ramonakalali

Ha Seotsanyane
Ha Sotane
Ha Toeba
Khotsang
Koeneng
Letlapeng
Liepeleng
Linokong
Lipeleng
Maboling
Mafikeng
Mahesheleng
Mainyatso
Majakeng

Makhiseng
Makokoaneng
Makorong
Malingoaneng
Maotoana
Maqhaung
Maresele
Masakoaneng
Masalla
Masokong
Materaseng
Matikiring
Matsieng
Meeling

Mohloling
Nqobelle
Ntšupe
Semapong
Semonkong
Sephokong
Taung
Tena-Bapehi (Ha Manakana)
Thaba-Sephara
Thuhloane
Tibising
Tloha-re-bue
Tsitsa
