= Pae-La-Itlhatsoa =

- Community Council
- Geographic Center of Community
- Coordinates: 29°02′48″S 28°54′36″E
- Country: Lesotho
- District: Mokhotlong District
- Elevation: 10,066 ft (3,068 m)

Population (2006)
  - Total: 2,080
- Time zone: UTC+2 (CAT)
- Coordinates computed from Lesotho Villages file.

Pae-La-Itlhatsoa is a community council located in the Mokhotlong District of Lesotho. Its population in 2006 was 2,080.

== Villages ==
The community of Pae-La-Itlhatsoa includes the villages of Bookamela, Ha Masasane, Ha Nthimolane, Koung, Lekhalong, Letšeng-la-Terae, Lichecheng, Likhutlong, Mafarung, Mahlasela, Majakaneng, Makhalaneng, Maloraneng, Matebeleng, Moeaneng, Nama-u-Lule, Pae-la-itlhatsoa, Patising and Sutumetsa.
