= Patlong =

- Community Council
- Geographic Center of Community
- Coordinates: 30°04′49″S 28°18′37″E
- Country: Lesotho
- District: Qacha's Nek District
- Elevation: 7,410 ft (2,260 m)

Population (2006)
  - Total: 10,819
- Time zone: UTC+2 (CAT)
- Coordinates computed from Lesotho Villages file.

Patlong is a community council located in the Qacha's Nek District of Lesotho. Its population in 2006 was 10,819.

== Villages ==
The community of Patlong includes the villages of Bongalla, Ha 'Mantsoaki, Ha Belebele, Ha Belebesi, Ha Hoki, Ha Joele, Ha Kali, Ha Kebakile, Ha Khoahla, Ha Letsooa, Ha Malefane, Ha Manyatse, Ha Matee, Ha Moeketsi, Ha Moeti, Ha Mokhothu, Ha Mokhotu, Ha Moleleki, Ha Nkoko, Ha Ntei, Ha Ntoko, Ha Ntsie, Ha Ntsoane, Ha Raene, Ha Ralekoala, Ha Raliseme, Ha Ramapane, Ha Ramoholi, Ha Ramotšeoa, Ha Ranketsi, Ha Rantšolo, Ha Raporoto, Ha Rariti, Ha Sehlooho, Ha Sejanamane, Ha Sekepe, Ha Sekoka, Ha Semethe, Ha Seqalaba, Ha Shakhane, Ha Tekane, Ha Thola, Ha Thosi, Ha Tlhoro, Khohlong, Koung, Letlapaneng, Lihlabaneng, Makhoaeleng, Matebeleng, Mateleng, Matholeng, Matikareng, Mavulaneng, Meeling, Mokhethoaneng, Mothating, Patlong, Phatla-Poho, Sekhalabateng, Sekhutloaneng, Taung, Terai Hoek, Thotaneng (Ha Sekake), Tlokoeng, Ha Sehlooho and Tsatsane.

== Roads ==
A network of rural gravel roads at Thaka-Makula in Qacha's Nek was handed over by Minister of Local Government and Chieftainship Affairs, Dr. Ponts’o Sekatle. The roads are constructed to connect several villages such as Makhoaeleng, Matlotlo, Matebeleng, Ha Masupha and Ha Potso among others.
