= Khalahali =

- Community Council
- Geographic Center of Community
- Coordinates: 29°07′27″S 29°06′45″E
- Country: Lesotho
- District: Mokhotlong District
- Elevation: 10,361 ft (3,158 m)

Population (2006)
  - Total: 8,220
- Time zone: UTC+2 (CAT)
- Coordinates computed from Lesotho Villages file.

Khalahali is a community council located in the Mokhotlong District of Lesotho. Its population in 2006 was 8,220.

== Villages ==
The community of Khalahali includes the villages of:

Boritsa
Bothakhisa-ntja
Ha Khama
Ha Khethisa (Thoteng)
Ha Lechesa
Ha Makhabane
Ha Makulane
Ha Malinyane
Ha Mothebesoane
Ha Ntone

Hlokoa-le-mafi
Koakoatsi
Likhang
Likoekoeng
Limapong
Linareng
Litšoeneng
Mahaneng
Makeneng

Mapateng
Maphalleng
Masenkeng
Matebeleng
Matsoapong
Moeaneng
Motalaneng
Motsitseng
Mphokojoane

Mphosisa
Patising
Phahameng
Sakeng
Sekhutloaneng
Sekoka
Sepatleng
Tšoana-Makhulo
Tšopholing
