= Ramatšeliso =

- Community Council
- Geographic Center of Community
- Coordinates: 30°02′41″S 28°51′49″E
- Country: Lesotho
- District: Qacha's Nek District
- Elevation: 6,289 ft (1,917 m)

Population (2006)
  - Total: 6,189
- Time zone: UTC+2 (CAT)
- Coordinates computed from Lesotho Villages file.

Ramatšeliso is a community council located in the Qacha's Nek District of Lesotho, on the southeastern border with South Africa. Its population in 2006 was 6,189.

== Villages ==
The community of Ramatšeliso includes the villages of Ha Boloumane, Ha Botala, Ha Jakopo, Ha Makeoane, Ha Makoae, Ha Mojaki, Ha Monyane, Ha Ntai, Ha Popi, Ha Ramahlaela, Ha Ramatšeliso, Ha Rankakala, Ha Semethe, Hill Top, Libataneng, Lifariking, Likotopong, Lioling, Liqaleng, Makhoareng, Makong, Mapakising, Mpondofong, Paneng and Sekolong.
