= Mosenekeng =

- Community Council
- Geographic Center of Community
- Coordinates: 29°54′28″S 28°45′09″E
- Country: Lesotho
- District: Qacha's Nek District
- Elevation: 7,369 ft (2,246 m)

Population (2006)
  - Total: 2,279
- Time zone: UTC+2 (CAT)
- Coordinates computed from Lesotho Villages file.

Mosenekeng is a community council located in the Qacha's Nek District of Lesotho. Its population in 2006 was 2,279.

== Villages ==
The community of Mosenekeng includes the villages of Ha Bantomo, Ha Mankoe, Ha Qei, Ha Ralengoele, Ha Ramokakatlela, Ha Seketane, Ha Sekoti, Ha Takatso, Ha Tšolo, Mosenekeng and Qenehelong.
