= Khomo-Phatsoa =

Khomo-Phatšoa
- Community Council
- Geographic Center of Community
- Coordinates: 29°55′24″S 28°58′56″E
- Country: Lesotho
- District: Qacha's Nek District
- Elevation: 7,618 ft (2,322 m)

Population (2006)
  - Total: 8,263
- Time zone: UTC+2 (CAT)
- Coordinates computed from Lesotho Villages file.

Khomo-Phatšoa is a community council located in the Qacha's Nek District of Lesotho. Its population in 2006 was 8,263.

== Villages ==
The community of Khomo-Phatšoa includes the villages of

Belebese
Ha Chabana
Ha Chaka
Ha Edward
Ha Katela
Ha Khabana
Ha Matapole
Ha Mavuka
Ha Moshebi

Ha Mosiuoa
Ha Sephelane
Ha Setefane
Ha Soloja
Khomo-Phatšoa
Koung
Letlapeng
Libateng
Likhameng

Likoebeleng
Mafika-Lisiu
Makorotong
Mpharane
Phahameng
Sehlabathebe
Sekoakoaneng
Semenyane
Thamathu

== Sehlabathebe National Park ==
The western part of Sehlabathebe National Park is bordered by a cluster of 14 villages which are part of the greater Khomo-Phatšoa Community Council - an area of 46ha managed as a managed resource area (MRA) with a community council endorsed natural and cultural heritage management plan.
