= Thaba-Khubelu =

- Community Council
- Geographic Center of Community
- Coordinates: 29°53′23″S 28°39′38″E
- Country: Lesotho
- District: Qacha's Nek District
- Elevation: 5,305 ft (1,617 m)

Population (2006)
  - Total: 5,219
- Time zone: UTC+2 (CAT)
- Coordinates computed from Lesotho Villages file.

Thaba-Khubelu is a community council located in the Qacha's Nek District of Lesotho. Its population in 2006 was 5,219.

== Villages ==
The community of Thaba-Khubelu includes the villages of Beselateng, Ha Letete, Ha Mofutho, Ha Molomo, Ha Mosebelo, Ha Motloang, Leseling (Liphakoeng), Leseling (Matatiele), Leseling (Mokoallong), Libobeng (Matšikhoaneng), Libobeng (Senarile), Mohlanapeng, Nkoeng and Rothifa.
