= Moremoholo =

- Community Council
- Geographic Center of Community
- Coordinates: 29°14′17″S 29°07′30″E
- Country: Lesotho
- District: Mokhotlong District
- Elevation: 7,431 ft (2,265 m)

Population (2006)
  - Total: 9,694
- Time zone: UTC+2 (CAT)
- Coordinates computed from Lesotho Villages file.

Moremoholo is a community council located in the Mokhotlong District of Lesotho. Its population in 2006 was 9,694.

== Villages ==
The community of Moremoholo includes the villages of Boiketlo, Botaisa, Foreistata, Ha Chopho (Bafali), Ha Hlakane, Ha Leapola, Ha Lebopo, Ha Lisene, Ha Makoae, Ha Molao, Ha Motanyane, Ha Poso, Ha Soai, Ha Tolotsana, Ha Tšekelo, Khohlong, Khohlong (Ha Senkoase), Letlapeng, Mahoeng (Ha Senkoase), Mahooeng, Makhapung, Makoatleng, Makoetjaneng, Mangaung, Mangopeng, Maphohong, Masaleng, Masuoaneng, Matebeleng, Matobo, Matsatsaneng, Moshemong, Mothontsene, Nkotoane, Ntsiking, Ntširele, Paneng, Senkoase, Sepanyeng (Ha Senkoase), Thaba-Khubelu, Thaba-Ntšo, Thoteng (Ha Senkoase), Tiping and Tlokoeng (Bafali).
