= 'Makholane =

- Community Council
- Geographic Center of Community
- Coordinates: 29°47′58″S 27°17′38″E
- Country: Lesotho
- District: Mafeteng District
- Elevation: 5,810 ft (1,770 m)

Population (2006)
  - Total: 25,002
- Time zone: UTC+2 (CAT)
- Coordinates computed from Lesotho Villages file.

'Makholane is a community council located in the Mafeteng District of Lesotho. Its population in 2006 was 25,002.

== Villages ==
The community of Makholane includes the villages of Ha 'Mpeli, Ha Chopho, Ha Isaka, Ha Joase, Ha Joase (Khohloaneng), Ha Joase (Thabeng), Ha Khalala, Ha Khalienyane, Ha Khalienyane (Mokhoabong), Ha Khati, Ha Koili, Ha Koili (Santeng), Ha Koloboi (Mokhoabong), Ha Koranta, Ha Kotoane, Ha Lebeta, Ha Leemisa, Ha Lempetje (Aupolasi), Ha Lempetje (Ha Malimo), Ha Lesia, Ha Lesole (Mokhoabong), Ha Libete, Ha Likupa, Ha Lumisi, Ha Lumisi (Metheoaneng), Ha Mafeto, Ha Mahali, Ha Maholi, Ha Maholi (Mahlabatheng), Ha Mahosi, Ha Makhathe, Ha Makopela, Ha Malilimetsa, Ha Manehella, Ha Matlatsoaneng, Ha Matšaba, Ha Matsepe, Ha Matsie, Ha Mohapi, Ha Mohlomi, Ha Mokhasi (Mokhoabong), Ha Mokhuthu, Ha Motlohi, Ha Motlohi (Leralleng), Ha Mpata, Ha Nthinya, Ha Ntlhakeng, Ha Ntsiane, Ha Oni, Ha Pelesa, Ha Phokojoe, Ha Qobete, Ha Raborane, Ha Ralerata, Ha Raliemere, Ha Ramaleshoane, Ha Ramarothele, Ha Ramatheko, Ha Ramohapi, Ha Ramokoatsi, Ha Ramontsoe, Ha Ramporoane, Ha Rankapu, Ha Ranthokho, Ha Sebusi, Ha Seetsi, Ha Sekoati, Ha Sempe, Ha Sephula, Ha Setenane, Ha Setenane (Mahloleng), Ha Setenane (Moreneng), Ha Setenane (Motimposo), Ha Tauhali, Ha Teba, Khatleng, Likupa, Liphiring (Ha Ramohapi), Litsahaneng, Litšilong, Maieaneng, Makeneng, Mapolateng, Matlapaneng, Matsooeng, Matsoseng (Ha Lesole), Motse-Mocha, Noka-Ntšo, Qotata, Semakaleng, Thabaneng, Thabaneng (Borokhong), Thabaneng (Maikhokhong), Thabaneng (Sekantšing), Thelingoaneng (Ha Sempe), Thotaneng, Thoteng, Tieleng, Tsaeng and Tsekong.

== Health care ==
The Amitofo Care Centre in Mafeteng was officially opened in 2011. The organization provides food support and education for vulnerable children. The 'Makholane Community Council provided land so that the centre would be constructed and is financially sponsored by Amitofo Charity Association.
