= Mathula =

- Community Council
- Geographic Center of Community
- Coordinates: 29°46′57″S 27°27′33″E
- Country: Lesotho
- District: Mafeteng District
- Elevation: 5,640 ft (1,719 m)

Population (2006)
  - Total: 17,867
- Time zone: UTC+2 (CAT)
- Coordinates computed from Lesotho Villages file.

Mathula is a community council located in the Mafeteng District of Lesotho. Its population in 2006 was 17,867.

== Villages ==
The community of Mathula includes the villages of Boiketlo, Boikhutso, Boithatelo, Ha Bereng, Ha Fako, Ha Kabai, Ha Khabo, Ha Lenake, Ha Lesoma, Ha Letuma, Ha Mabula, Ha Majoro, Ha Makholela, Ha Masupha (Lipatolong), Ha Matsa, Ha Mokhothu, Ha Mokoena, Ha Molise, Ha Moseli, Ha Mosotho, Ha Moteletsane, Ha Mphatle, Ha Nkheche, Ha Ntaba, Ha Paki, Ha Phatsane, Ha Rabolilana, Ha Raletebele, Ha Raletooane, Ha Ramabilikoe, Ha Ramatšeliso, Ha Ramokhele, Ha Ramorake, Ha Ramoreki, Ha Ramosiee, Ha Ramosoeunyane, Ha Rannakoe, Ha Salemone, Ha Seeiso, Ha Sekhaupane, Ha Sekheke, Ha Senatla, Ha Serobo, Ha Shale, Ha Thahanyane, Ha Thamae, Ha Tjopa, Ha Tšiu, Ha Tšoeute, Khophocha, Lekhalong, Letšeng, Lihlookong, Likotopong, Lithabaneng, Maholokoane, Makeoane, Makokotoaneng, Manganeng, Mathebe, Mohau-Oa-Pelo, Moreneng, Morunyaneng, Nkoaneng, Sekantšing, Takalatsa, Thaba-Tsoeu Ha Mafa, Thabaneng, Top Centre and Tsoaing.
