= 'Mamantšo =

- Community Council
- Geographic Center of Community
- Coordinates: 29°37′59″S 27°20′13″E
- Country: Lesotho
- District: Mafeteng District
- Elevation: 5,568 ft (1,697 m)

Population (2006)
  - Total: 21,175
- Time zone: UTC+2 (CAT)
- Coordinates computed from Lesotho Villages file.

'Mamantšo is a community council located in the Mafeteng District of Lesotho. Its population in 2006 was 21,175.

== Villages ==
The community of 'Mamantšo includes 80 different villages according to the Lesotho Bureau of Statistics, they are listed below:

- Ha 'Mikia
- Ha Bele (Motsekuoa)
- Ha Challa
- Ha Cheche
- Ha Damane
- Ha Hlaheng
- Ha Khapetsi
- Ha Khausi
- Ha Khirisone
- Ha Khoele
- Ha Khola
- Ha Lejelathoko (Kolo)
- Ha Lekeba
- Ha Mahlasane
- Ha Mahlehle
- Ha Maholi
- Ha Majake
- Ha Makintane
- Ha Matlali
- Ha Mochekoane
- Ha Moeketsane
- Ha Mofo
- Ha Mohale (Kolo)
- Ha Mohlalefi
- Ha Moiphepi
- Ha Molise
- Ha Molokoe
- Ha Monkhe
- Ha Motlokoa
- Ha Motumi
- Ha Mpalami
- Ha Mphamo
- Ha Mphaololi
- Ha Mphasa
- Ha Mpopo
- Ha Nkhabu
- Ha Nkhabu (Kolo)
- Ha Nooana
- Ha Notši
- Ha Ntisana
- Ha Ntsie
- Ha Petlane
- Ha Petlane (Kolo)
- Ha Phakoe
- Ha Rabeleng
- Ha Rabu
- Ha Ralenkoane
- Ha Raliopelo
- Ha Ralitabo
- Ha Ramothabeng
- Ha Rampenyane
- Ha Rankhethi
- Ha Ranteme
- Ha Raputsoe
- Ha Ratšoeu
- Ha Rou
- Ha Sekoai
- Ha Semoli
- Ha Seobi
- Ha Taemane
- Ha Tan
- Ha Tlai-Tlai
- Ha Tlaliatsana
- Ha Tokonye
- Ha Tomotomo
- Khubetsoana
- Koi-Boot
- Malaleng
- Malimong
- Mankoaneng
- Manyareleng
- Marakong
- Marutlhoaneng
- Matsoseng
- Motsekuoa
- Pontšeng
- Reisi
- Sephokoaneng
- Tebang
- Tibeleng
