= Koti-Se-Phola =

- Community Council
- The headman's trailer in Ha 'Ngoae

- Geographic Center of Community
- Coordinates: 29°57′24″S 27°25′25″E
- Country: Lesotho
- District: Mafeteng District
- Elevation: 5,761 ft (1,756 m)

Population (2006)
  - Total: 12,391
- Time zone: UTC+2 (CAT)
- Coordinates computed from Lesotho Villages file.

Koti-Se-Phola is a community council located in the Mafeteng District of Lesotho. Its population in 2006 was 12,391.

== Villages ==
The community of Koti-Se-Phola includes the villages of

Foreisetata
Ha 'Ngoae
Ha Bera
Ha Bofihla
Ha Khalimane
Ha Khauta (Khobotle)
Ha Khoete
Ha Konote
Ha Lehana

Ha Lekoatsa
Ha Lengolo
Ha Machafeela
Ha Mahlahlathane
Ha Mahooana
Ha Makhabane
Ha Mofoka
Ha Panta
Ha Sebili

Ha Sechaba
Ha Sethabela
Ha Thakanyane
Ha Thakhalle
Linotšing
Liphakoeng (Khobotle)
Maholong
Majakaneng (Khobotle)
Makhetheng

Makoabating
Maqhatseng
Maralleng
Maserung
Motse-Mocha
Ntšekalle
Sehlabaneng
Seqhobong
Thabaneng
