= Mokulubete Makatisi =

Lesotho long-distance runner

Personal information
- Born: 1 September 1995 (age 30) Lesobeng, Lesotho

Sport
- Country: Lesotho
- Sport: Athletics
- Event: Long-distance running

Mokulubete Blandina Makatisi (born 1 September 1995) is a Mosotho long-distance runner. She qualified for the 2024 Summer Olympics.

== Biography ==
Makatisi was born on 1 September 1995 in Lesobeng, Lesotho, where she grew up. The first of five children, she attended school in Lesobeng until 2010, enrolled at a school in Mapholaneng, in 2011, and then attended Bloemfontein Trompsburg Secondary School in Bloemfontein, South Africa, for two years. She returned to Lesotho in 2015 due to a study permit issue.

Makatisi competed in athletics from a young age, but only began taking the sport seriously in 2010, when she was selected to compete at an international tournament in Botswana. She competed in the Maputo All-Africa Games in 2011, and in the following four years her accomplishments included winning the 10 km Zululand and 10 km Harry Gwala races, winning gold in the 5,000 metres and silver in the 1,500 metres at the South African Open Championship, and winning three medals at the 2014 AUSC Games (gold in the 1,500m, bronze in the 3,000m, 5,000m).

Makatisi competed at the All-Africa Games in Brazzaville in 2015 and the Botswana Championships in 2016. She participated in the 1,500m and 5,000m at the 2018 Commonwealth Games, and competed in the 5,000m at the 2019 African Games. She returned to the Commonwealth Games in 2022, where she finished eighth in the women's marathon event, setting a personal best time of 2:36:05. She came in eighth despite competing in shoes that she was wearing for the first time, as well as concerns that her performance was hindered by the delay in receiving them on the eve of the race.

In 2023, Makatisi placed 42nd at the World Athletics Championships. She also served as the co-Lesotho flag bearer at the 2023 African Beach Games, where she competed in the beach marathon event and won silver. At the 2023 Nelson Mandela Bay Half Marathon, she set the national record with a time of 1:09:45. (Note: World Athletics listed a time of 1:09:45, while the Lesotho News Agency reported a time of 1:09:44.) She received a universality selection to participate at the 2024 Summer Olympics, being one of three representatives of her country. Her selection sparked controversy as the Lesotho National Olympic Committee approved her as the selection, but the Federation of Athletics Lesotho (FAL) believed Neheng Khatala was more qualified and abruptly sent Makatisi a letter stating that her Olympic appearance had been canceled. However, ultimately, Makatisi was selected to compete, being approved by World Athletics (WA). At the Olympics, she placed 31st in the women's marathon with a time of 2:30:20. She served as the co-Lesotho flag bearer at the closing Olympic ceremony. In 2025, Makatise was banned for three years by the World Anti-Doping Agency (WADA) after taking Trenbolone, a banned veterinary drug. The test occurred on 11 October 2024. Due to her signing an admission of guilt prior to an April 10 deadline, her ban was reduced by a year. Her ban was set to expire in October 2027.
