= Qibing =

- Community Council
- Geographic Center of Community
- Coordinates: 29°46′45″S 27°07′42″E
- Country: Lesotho
- District: Mafeteng District
- Elevation: 4,869 ft (1,484 m)

Population (2006)
  - Total: 17,374
- Time zone: UTC+2 (CAT)
- Coordinates computed from Lesotho Villages file.

Qibing is a community council located in the Mafeteng District of Lesotho. Its population in 2006 was 17,374.

== Villages ==
The community of Qibing includes the villages of Boluma-Tau, Ha 'Mamaribana, Ha 'Mamothibeli, Ha Aujong, Ha Fokase, Ha Hlaoli, Ha Joele, Ha Khang, Ha Khasapane, Ha Khojane, Ha Khothu, Ha Lekhari, Ha Lepolesa, Ha Likhotolo, Ha Machafeela (Qhasisi), Ha Maema, Ha Maoela, Ha Maretlane, Ha Mashapha, Ha Masiu, Ha Masupha (Thabang), Ha Matlakala, Ha Matlamokele, Ha Matsie, Ha Matšoaboli, Ha Mohlehli, Ha Mokhoea (Qhasisi), Ha Molapo, Ha Montoeli, Ha Monyalotsa, Ha Motanyane, Ha Mphobe, Ha Nkalimeng, Ha Nqoloane, Ha Nyapholi, Ha Patisi, Ha Patsa, Ha Patsi, Ha Phatsoane, Ha Phepheng, Ha Rakhapu, Ha Ralebese, Ha Ralerupa, Ha Ralintši, Ha Ralipere, Ha Ramahlape, Ha Ramatsabane, Ha Ratomo, Ha Seeiso, Ha Semona, Ha Sepelemane, Ha Taelo, Ha Tanyele, Ha Tebatso, Ha Tlhoela, Hlakoaneng, Letlapeng, Likokong, Lithabaneng, Mahlakung, Malosong, Manganeng, Marua, Mohlanapeng, Naleli, Sekantšing, Sekoting, Thabana-Tšooana, Tšupane and Vanrooyen.
