= Ts'A-Le-Moleka =

- Community Council
- Geographic Center of Community
- Coordinates: 28°45′40″S 28°20′07″E
- Country: Lesotho
- District: Butha-Buthe District
- Elevation: 5,791 ft (1,765 m)

Population (2006)
  - Total: 18,737
- Time zone: UTC+2 (CAT)
- Coordinates computed from Lesotho Villages file.

Ts'A-Le-Moleka is a community council located in the Butha-Buthe District of Lesotho. Its population in 2006 was 18,737.

== Villages ==
The community of Ts'A Le Moleka includes the villages of Ha Biafa, Ha Fako, Ha Komoho, Ha Lekanyane, Ha Letsika, Ha Makhoahla, Ha Makhotla, Ha Makuini, Ha Malefane, Ha Maleholo, Ha Malofo, Ha Manamela, Ha Masek'hou, Ha Matjeka, Ha Mohlanka, Ha Mokhatla (Manamela), Ha Molibeli (Manamela), Ha Moshoeshoe (Kololong), Ha Motabola, Ha Motinyane (Qalo), Ha Motjanyela, Ha Motsoari (Qalo), Ha Mpaki, Ha Ntsoana (Serutle), Ha Pokane, Ha Qophela, Ha Sebophe, Ha Selomo, Khilibitling, Kotsonkoaneng, Liforong (Ha Leboea), Likhahleng, Liphakoeng, Maholong, Majakaneng, Makong, Malimong (Ha Leboea), Maloseng, Mamphaneng, Manamela, Mantlakane, Mantloaneng, Marabeng, Masite, Matsatsaneng, Mothae, Qalo, Rolosela, Sebothoane (Serutle), Sekoting, Sekubu Mission, Seliba-Setšo (Manamela), Sephokong, Taung, Tebe-Tebe (Serutle), Thajaneng and Tikathole (Ha Leboea).

Sekubu Mission was founded in 1877 by Francis Richard Townley Balfour.
