= Thaba-Chitja =

Bokong
- Community Council
- Geographic Center of Community
- Coordinates: 29°17′06″S 28°23′27″E
- Country: Lesotho
- District: Thaba-Tseka District
- Elevation: 7,310 ft (2,228 m)

Population (2006)
  - Total: 7,283
- Time zone: UTC+2 (CAT)
- Coordinates computed from Lesotho Villages file.

Bokong is a community council located in the Thaba-Tseka District of Lesotho. Its population in 2006 was 7,283.

== Villages ==
The community of Bokong includes the villages of Chaena, Fukhumela, Ha Joele, Ha K'henene, Ha Khoaisi, Ha Khunong, Ha Mafosa, Ha Mahooana, Ha Makhangoa, Ha Makhangoa (Manganeng), Ha Makhona, Ha Makhuoeng, Ha Malimola, Ha Mantsi, Ha Maphike, Ha Mikhane, Ha Mokati, Ha Mothepu, Ha Nkhunyane, Ha Ramarebotse, Ha Ramokoatsi, Ha Rampai, Ha Sepiriti, Ha Suoane (Liontong), Ha Suoane (Manganeng), Ha Suoane (Matebeleng), Ha Suoane (Phahameng), Katse, Khohlo-Ntšo, Khokhoba, Letsatseng, Linkoaneng, Makhoabeng, Mokurutlung, Sephareng, Spear and Thabaneng.
