= Malumeng =

- Community Council
- Geographic Center of Community
- Coordinates: 29°53′30″S 27°27′00″E
- Country: Lesotho
- District: Mafeteng District
- Elevation: 6,316 ft (1,925 m)

Population (2006)
  - Total: 9,740
- Time zone: UTC+2 (CAT)
- Coordinates computed from Lesotho Villages file.

Malumeng is a community council located in the Mafeteng District of Lesotho. Its population in 2006 was 9,740.

== Villages ==
The community of Malumeng includes the villages of Ha Heri, Ha Isaka, Ha Kubelle, Ha Lebamang, Ha Leboto, Ha Mabatla, Ha Mahooana, Ha Maisane, Ha Majara, Ha Manthama, Ha Marite, Ha Mashaile, Ha Masia, Ha Masooane, Ha Mokoenehi, Ha Molete, Ha Moloi, Ha Monono, Ha Monyane, Ha Moqanyane, Ha Motamolane, Ha Mothokho, Ha Ntšonyane, Ha Pitso, Ha Ralintoane, Ha Ramathaha, Ha Ramathaleha, Ha Ramatima, Ha Rantaba, Ha Raseboko, Ha Ratheepe, Ha Seatile, Ha Sebaki, Ha Sebatli, Ha Sekhele, Ha Sekhonyana, Ha Seshemane, Ha Tjoobe, Ha Tobi, Ha Turupu, Khohlong, Libopeng, Limapong, Liptjemptjeteng, Mahlokeng, Malumeng, Manganeng, Marabeng, Matebeng, Moeaneng, Motse-Mocha, Qibing, Sehlabaneng, Sekhutlong, Thibella, Thoteng and Thoteng-ea-Khoete.
