= Monyake =

Monyake Monyake Thabana Morena/Taung
- Community Council
- Nickname: Monyake
- Geographic Center of Community
- Coordinates: 29°45′45″S 27°36′50″E
- Country: Lesotho
- District: Mafeteng District
- Elevation: 6,960 ft (2,120 m)

Population (2006)
  - Total: 12,234
- Time zone: UTC+2 (CAT)
- Co-ordinates computed from Lesotho Villages file.

Monyake is a community council located in the Mohale's Hoek of Lesotho. Its population in 2006 was 12,234.

Under the previous administrations, the community used to fall under the Mafeteng District, but under the new demarcation, this village has been moved to the Mohale's Hoek district, with other villages such as Ha Panta, Ha Lengolo remaining under Thabana-Morena within the Mafeteng District.

== Villages ==
The community of Monyake includes the villages of

Botšoela; Fuleng; Ha Faba; Ha Josia; Ha Khomo-ea-Monyatsi; Ha Khotela; Ha Khunoana; Ha Kubutu; Ha Leata; Ha Lentsoe; Ha Lethula; Ha Machakela; Ha Makhakhe; Ha Malefetsane; Ha Malefo; Ha Manosa; Ha Mapesela	Ha Matjeka; Ha Mohlakala; Ha Mohloai; Ha Mokete; Ha Mokhethi; Ha Monyake; Ha Moqulo; Ha Mosala; Ha Motaba; Ha Motjatji; Ha Mpalipali; Ha Mphatsi; Ha Nkeo; Ha Nthonyana; Ha Ntsibane; Ha Phafoli; Ha Ralebona	Ha Ramahaetsane; Ha Ramochele; Ha Ramoshabe; Ha Raphosholi; Ha Ratšiu; Ha Sehlabo; Ha Sehloho; Ha Sekake; Ha Sekhobe; Ha Sepitla; Ha Setimela; Ha Shea; Ha Shekeshe; Ha Soko; Ha Thabo; Ha Tjale; Ha Tlebete	Khomojong; Koti-Sekhutšoane; Koung; Letaeng; Likhotoleng; Liseleng; Maliepetsane; Mangaung; Methinyeng; Moeaneng; Pontšeng; Sekokoaneng; Selonyane; Thabang; Tsukutsoana; Tšupane
