= Seating =

Seating may refer to:

== Events ==
- Seating assignment, a type scheme determining how an audience should be seated for an event
- Seating plan, a diagram or instructions determining where people should sit
- Stadium seating
- Theatre seating, physical seats in a theatre

== Transport ==
- 2+2 (seating arrangement), a seating style in a car
- Airline seating, seating in an airline

== See also ==
- American Seating, a company that manufactures seating
- Picnic table
- Seat (disambiguation)
- Kids' table
