= Makaota =

- Community Council
- Geographic Center of Community
- Coordinates: 29°51′04″S 27°14′16″E
- Country: Lesotho
- District: Mafeteng District
- Elevation: 5,266 ft (1,605 m)

Population (2006)
  - Total: 31,014
- Time zone: UTC+2 (CAT)
- Coordinates computed from Lesotho Villages file.

Makaota is a community council located in the Mafeteng District of Lesotho. Its population in 2006 was 31,014.

== Villages ==
The community of Makaota includes the villages of Borokhong, Ha 'Mei, Ha Kotoanyane, Ha Kuebu, Ha Lebenkele, Ha Matsepe, Ha Mofalali, Ha Mothokho, Ha Motlere, Ha Mphatšoane, Ha Mpholle, Ha Nthebe, Ha Ramokhele, Ha Ramokhele (Koeneng), Ha Ramokoena, Ha Ranteme, Ha Seitlheko, Ha Souru, Ha Tšele, Ha Tseleng, Hospital Area, Khalahali, Khubetsoana, Lecop, Leloaleng, Lifelekoaneng, Likoung, Machoaboleng, Matheneng, Matholeng, Matlapaneng, Matsatseng, Motse-Mocha (Ha Matsepe), Paballong, Phahameng, Ramatlepe, Sekantšing (Ha Lekhari), Thabaneng, Tjorosing and Wepener Road.
