= Linakeng =

- Community Council
- Geographic Center of Community
- Coordinates: 29°31′36″S 28°46′51″E
- Country: Lesotho
- District: Thaba-Tseka District
- Elevation: 6,670 ft (2,033 m)

Population (2006)
  - Total: 4,347
- Time zone: UTC+2 (CAT)
- Coordinates computed from Lesotho Villages file.

Linakeng is a community council located in the Thaba-Tseka District of Lesotho.

== Villages ==
The community of Linakeng includes the villages of Ha Firi, Matebeng, Sehonghong, Mashai (Moreneng), Hloahloeng (Ha Teke), Taung, Khotsong, Ha Rampeoane, Phahameng, Ha Motjolopane, Ha Theko, Pontseng, Ha Mankereu, Kolebere, Ha Khanyetsi, Ha Setala, Khochaneng, Ha Seroala-Nkhoana, Linakeng, Ha Makunyapane, Ha Shoaepane, Taung, Ha Khoali, Ha Khatho, Matlatseng, Lekhalong, Ha Makoko, Pitseng, Makhanyaneng, Bokhoase, Thaba-Bosiu, Ha Korotla, Lulang, Ha Mapheelle, Tiping, Ha Chakatsa, Moriting,
