= Ramoetsana =

- Community Council
- Geographic Center of Community
- Coordinates: 29°53′57″S 27°39′46″E
- Country: Lesotho
- District: Mafeteng District
- Elevation: 6,936 ft (2,114 m)

Population (2006)
  - Total: 10,519
- Time zone: UTC+2 (CAT)
- Coordinates computed from Lesotho Villages file.

Ramoetsana is a community council located in the Mafeteng District of Lesotho. Its population in 2006 was 10,519.

== Villages ==
The community of Ramoetsane includes the villages of

Ha Beo
Ha Berente
Ha Bukana
Ha Chechane
Ha Fako
Ha Ferete
Ha Hlasoa
Ha Jobo
Ha Leaooa
Ha Leboto
Ha Lekhoa
Ha Lekokosa
Ha Lenka
Ha Letsema
Ha Liholo
Ha Limo
Ha Maama
Ha Mabusetsa
Ha Majela
Ha Makhabane
Ha Makhejane
Ha Makhomo

Ha Makoae
Ha Maletlatsa
Ha Matabane
Ha Matee
Ha Mateu
Ha Mathabang
Ha Matheka
Ha Mokena
Ha Mokhethi
Ha Molati
Ha Moluo-luo
Ha Monaheng
Ha Moolisa
Ha Mopeli
Ha Mothepu
Ha Motloang
Ha Motoai
Ha Motsamai
Ha Motumi
Ha Mpheulane
Ha Nalana
Ha Ndaemane

Ha Nketsi
Ha Nkhahle
Ha Nkieane
Ha Notoane
Ha Nthota
Ha Poliaroto
Ha Qhooja
Ha Rammuso
Ha Ramoetsane
Ha Rampeteku
Ha Rantsipe
Ha Rasoai
Ha Ratjopa
Ha Roitire
Ha Salae
Ha Seahle
Ha Sechaba
Ha Seeiso
Ha Seele
Ha Sekhaila
Ha Sekhaoli

Ha Selisa
Ha Setumpane
Ha Shekoe
Ha Thaka-Banna
Ha Thetso
Ha Thoso
Ha Tomane
Ha Tšilo
Ha Tšoene
Ha Tšupane
Kelepeng
Khakhathane
Khubetsoana
Lekhalong
Lifajaneng
Lihlabaneng
Liphiring
Liqokoeng
Mahlatheng
Makoaqa
Mankoane

Maphonkoane
Masaleng
Matebeleng
Mekokong
Moeaneng
Mohlanapeng
Mokurutlung
Molleloa
Moqechane
Moreneng
Moseaneng
Motse-mocha
Motsekuoa
Phahameng
Phocha
Phuthalichaba
Sekokoaneng
Taboleng
Thaba-Bosiu
Thaba-Kotjo
Thaba-Sekoka
