= Makheka, Maseru District =

Coordinates: 29.66°S 27.86°E

Makheka
- Community council
- Interactive map of Makheka
- Country: Lesotho
- District: Maseru District
- Time zone: UTC+2 (CAT)

Makheka is a community council located in the Maseru District of Lesotho. Its population in 2006 was 5,473.
