= Mapholaneng =

- Community Council
- Geographic Center of Community
- Coordinates: 29°10′45″S 28°52′59″E
- Country: Lesotho
- District: Mokhotlong District
- Elevation: 6,877 ft (2,096 m)

Population (2006)
  - Total: 8,606
- Time zone: UTC+2 (CAT)
- Coordinates computed from Lesotho Villages file.

Mapholaneng is a community council located in the Mokhotlong District of Lesotho. Its population in 2006 was 8,606.

== Villages ==
The community of Mapholaneng includes the villages of Bochabela, Boimamelo, Bolahla, Checheng, Ha 'Mantšieng, Ha Komotere, Ha Mapheulane, Ha Maputsoe, Ha Ntšesanyane, Ha Nyokololi, Ha Rammeleke, Ha Sebaretlane, Ha Tsomoli, Khukhune, Lebakana, Letlapeng, Letsaneng, Likhoale, Likoting, Likoung, Lipululeng, Lithoteng, Mafika-Lisiu, Mahemeng, Maholing, Majakaneng, Makalieng, Makopanong, Malothoaneng, Manganeng, Mankeng, Mapelesa, Masoleng, Matebeleng, Matebeng, Matsoiring, Meketeng, Mofolaneng, Mok'honane, Mokhoabong, Motete, Nkutloise, Phatlalla, Polomiti, Sebera, Taung, Teraeng, Terapaneng, Thaba-Bosiu, Tiping, Tšepong and Tšieng.
