= Metsi-Maholo =

Metsi-Maholo Metsi-Matšo
- Community Council
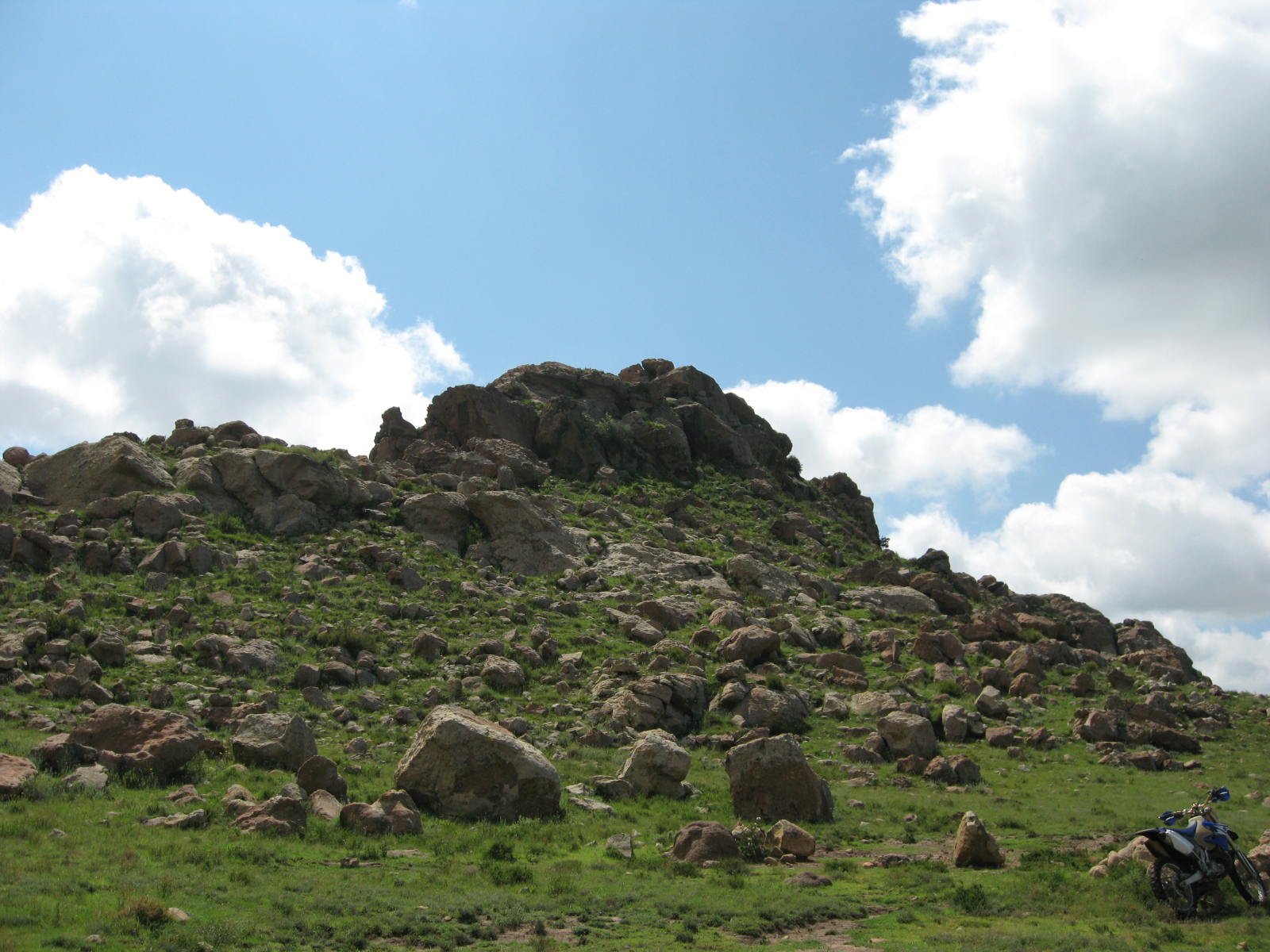
- Tsa Kholo

- Geographic Center of Community
- Coordinates: 29°37′06″S 27°10′21″E
- Country: Lesotho
- District: Mafeteng District
- Elevation: 5,223 ft (1,592 m)

Population (2006)
  - Total: 21,480
- Time zone: UTC+2 (CAT)
- Coordinates computed from Lesotho Villages file.

Metsi-Maholo is a community council located in the Mafeteng District of Lesotho. Its population in 2006 was 21,480.

== Villages ==
The community of Metsi-Maholo includes the villages of Bokone (Ha Monokoa), Bongalla, Ha Bakhomi, Ha Boranta, Ha Chele, Ha Fako, Ha Hlelesoa, Ha Kalinyane, Ha Keketsi, Ha Khame, Ha Khetsi, Ha Khoro, Ha Koki, Ha Leburu, Ha Lenonyane, Ha Leteketa, Ha Letšoara, Ha Lijane, Ha Likoabe, Ha Mabotse, Ha Maoela, Ha Mapitse (Kalichane), Ha Masia, Ha Masoetsa, Ha Masoli, Ha Matetoane, Ha Matlokotsi, Ha Matsepe, Ha Mochekoane, Ha Moeletsi, Ha Mofolo, Ha Mofota, Ha Mohapi, Ha Mojela, Ha Mojela (Tša-Kholo), Ha Mokhasi, Ha Mokhisa, Ha Mokoatsi, Ha Mokone, Ha Moqhosha, Ha Morakanyane, Ha Mosotho, Ha Motholo, Ha Motšoari, Ha Mpeli, Ha Mphulenyane, Ha Mutsoe, Ha Naile, Ha Nkete, Ha Nkhanti, Ha Ntaote, Ha Phechela, Ha Polaki, Ha Rachabeli, Ha Rakherere, Ha Rakhoboko, Ha Ramatsie, Ha Rammoko, Ha Ramohapi, Ha Ramosiuoane, Ha Ramotoho, Ha Ranko, Ha Rantai, Ha Rapata, Ha Ratoeba, Ha Seng, Ha Shoaeane, Ha Shoeane, Ha Tang, Ha Tankiso, Ha Theko, Ha Thoahlane, Ha Tholeli, Ha Thulo, Ha Tjobase, Ha Tšoane, Khotsoaneng, Koung, Lekhalong, Likhetleng, Majakaneng, Makhanyeng, Makhemeng, Malimong, Malumeng, Mamphaneng, Marakong, Matlatseng, Motse-Mocha, Sekameng, Sekhutloaneng and Thabana-Ntšonyana.
