= Tajane =

- Community Council
- Geographic Center of Community
- Coordinates: 29°41′47″S 27°31′26″E
- Country: Lesotho
- District: Mafeteng District
- Elevation: 5,472 ft (1,668 m)

Population (2006)
  - Total: 5,809
- Time zone: UTC+2 (CAT)
- Coordinates computed from Lesotho Villages file.

Tajane is a community council located in the Mafeteng District of Lesotho. Its population in 2006 was 5,809.

== Villages ==
The community of Tajane includes the villages of Boithatelo, Ha 'Muso, Ha Koki, Ha Kori, Ha Lesaoana, Ha Machaha, Ha Mahapela, Ha Mantitana, Ha Mothebesoane, Ha Motseko (Matebeleng), Ha Mpapa, Ha Nkafane, Ha Rakhoboso, Ha Raliapeng, Ha Ramahotetsa, Ha Seketooane, Ha Seoli, Ha Seqobela, Ha Shakhane, Ha Tapole, Ha Thobi, Ha Tsikela, Kopanong, Makhereising, Metlaeeng, Moreneng, Phelandaba, Phomolong, Thoteng, Tsoloane, and le Ha Koporala.
