= 'Malakeng =

- Community Council
- Geographic Center of Community
- Coordinates: 29°52′29″S 27°33′48″E
- Country: Lesotho
- District: Mafeteng District
- Elevation: 6,608 ft (2,014 m)

Population (2006)
  - Total: 8,382
- Time zone: UTC+2 (CAT)
- Coordinates computed from Lesotho Villages file.

'Malakeng is a community council located in the Mafeteng District of Lesotho. Its population in 2006 was 8,382.

== Villages ==
The community of Malakeng includes the villages of Ha 'Majane, Ha 'Motsi, Ha Daniel, Ha Hlelesi, Ha Jase, Ha Kanono, Ha Kholoanyane, Ha Khorong, Ha Lemonomono, Ha Letooane, Ha Likhama, Ha Makhaooane, Ha Makhasane, Ha Makoanyane, Ha Maliehe, Ha Motau, Ha Ntele, Ha Phatela, Ha Pitso, Ha Qaba, Ha Rabele, Ha Ralehoabali, Ha Ralipoli, Ha Ramakhakhe, Ha Ramosoeu, Ha Rantanyane, Ha Rantho, Ha Rapokane, Ha Setlakotlako, Ha Shololo, Ha Tebelo, Ha Tlhone, Ha Tohlang, Ha Tšoeunyane, Ha Tsoinyane, Khilibiting, Lehlakaneng, Letlapeng (Malealea), Likhohloaneng, Lithabaneng, Litšoeneng, Makhetheng, Makhomalong (Malealea), Makhoseng, Malere, Metsohlong, Mohlakeng, Ngoana-Khare, Pitseng, Sekhutlong, Sekiring, Tšeea-Nku and Tutulung.
