= Likeleli Tampane =

Mosotho politician

Minister of Gender and Youth, Sports and Recreation of Lesotho
- In office 2020–2022

Personal details
- Born: Mabuleng, Mokhotlong
- Party: DC
- Education: Institute for Extra Mural Studies, African University and National University of Lesotho

Likeleli Tampane is the Mosotho politician and previously the Minister of Gender and Youth, Sports and Recreation in Lesotho. She was formerly the Minister of Tourism, Environment and Culture.

== Background and education ==
Likeleli Tampane was born in Mabuleng, Mokhotolong district in Lesotho. Tampane has a Bachelor’s Degree in Pastoral Care and Counselling from the National University of Lesotho and also a Master’s Degree in Public Sector Management from Africa University in Zimbabwe. She also earned a certificate in Adult Education.

== Career ==
Tampane was a member of the executive of the African Peer Review Mechanism; in 2011 she stood as a representative sent to South Africa to prepare for Lesotho’s African Peer Review Mechanism launch. In 2012 Tampane was appointed as a Member of the Parliament in Lesotho. She also worked as a Teacher and Librarian in Mapholaneng High School in Lesotho. Tampane has held various positions in the government sectors.
