= Sotho Sounds =

Mosotho band

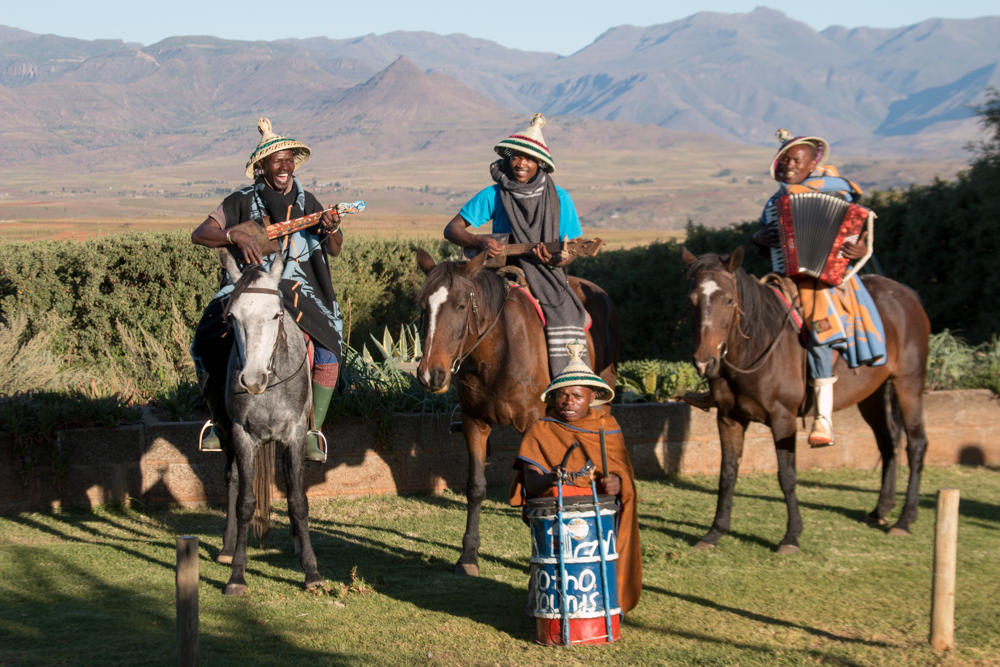
- Sotho Sounds in 2014

Background information
- Origin: Malealea, Lesotho
- Genres: Sotho traditional
- Website: sothosoundsltd.blogspot.com

Sotho Sounds are a band from Malealea, a village in south-west Lesotho. The members of Sotho Sounds are shepherds and built their instruments themselves.

== History ==
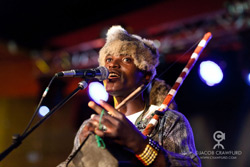
Sotho Sounds performing at WOMEX in 2011

Sotho Sounds recorded their debut album Sotho Sounds Malealea, produced by Risenga Makondo, in 2003. The band sold the album on CDs at concerts. In July 2003 Sotho Sounds performed at WOMAD festival in the UK.

In 2012 Sotho Sounds' album Junk Funk was released on Riverboat Records. Robin Denselow of The Guardian wrote of the album that "[Sotho Sounds'] approach may be rough and ready but their energy and enthusiasm are contagious." In a review of the album, The Independent compared Sotho Sounds favourably to Konono Nº1 and Staff Benda Bilili, who also play self-made instruments. That same year Sotho Sounds told Deutschlandfunk that most Basotho were more interested in western music than the traditional music that they play.

== Discography ==
=== Albums ===
- Sotho Sounds Malealea (2003)
- Junk Funk (2012, Riverboat Records)
