= Seat (disambiguation) =

A seat is a place to sit.

SEAT is a Spanish car manufacturer.

Seat or SEAT may also refer to:

== Relating to seating ==
- Airline seat
- Chair
- Car seat
  - Child safety seat, for children in a car
- Saddle, a type of seat used on the backs of animals or bicycles

== Government and legal ==
- Administrative centre, a seat of regional administration or local government
- Legislative seat, a membership in a parliament or other legislature
- Seat (administrative division), territorial-administrative unit in the medieval Hungarian Kingdom
- Seat (legal entity), indicating where the headquarters of the entity are located
- Seat of government, the building(s) or city from which a government exercises its authority
- Throne, the seat of state of a potentate or dignitary

== Other uses ==
- Rebour, a French car brand car known as the "Catalonia S.E.A.T." (sold by Sociedad Española de Automóviles y Transportes)
- Seat, 17th-century name used for the star Pi Aquarii
- Seat (Buttermere), a fell in the Lake District, Cumbria, England
- Southeast Area Transit (SEAT), a bus agency in Connecticut
- Single Engine Air Tanker (SEAT), a type of aircraft
- The Seat (film), a 2025 documentary short

== See also ==
- Canton seat
- Chair (officer), a seat of office, authority, or dignity
- Country seat, an English country house
- County seat
- Ejection seat, rescue seat in an aircraft
- Family seat
- Jump seat, auxiliary seat in a vehicle or aircraft
- Per-seat license, a software licensing model
- Right seat, co-pilot's seat
- Seate, surname
- Seating (disambiguation)
