= List of districts of Lesotho by Human Development Index =

This is a list of districts of Lesotho by Human Development Index as of 2023.

Rank	District	HDI (2023)
Medium human development
1	Maseru	0.587
2	Berea	0.577
–	Lesotho	0.550
Low human development
3	Butha-Buthe	0.545
4	Leribe	0.545
5	Mohale's Hoek	0.526
6	Mafeteng	0.540
7	Qacha's Nek	0.521
8	Quthing	0.512
9	Mokhotlong	0.485
10	Thaba-Tseka	0.459
