= Community councils of Lesotho =

The districts of Lesotho are further divided into constituencies, which are in turn divided into community councils.

== Functions ==
Functions of a community council:

- Area Economic Planning
- Bridle Paths
- Burial Grounds
- Cemeteries
- Grazing Control
- HIV and AIDS Coordination
- Land Allocation
- Natural Resource Control
- Pollution and Environmental Conservation
- Pre Primary Education
- Public Markets Control
- Rural Access Roads
- Sports and Recreation
- Water Supply

== Community councils by district ==
=== Berea District ===
- Makeoana
- Mapoteng
- Kueneng
- Tebe-Tebe
- Phuthiatsana
- Motanasela
- Senekane
- Kanana
- Berea

=== Butha-Buthe District ===
- Kao
- Likila
- Linakeng
- Lipelaneng
- Liqhobong
- Makhunoane
- Moteng
- Ntelle
- Sekhobe
- Moleka

=== Leribe District ===
- Fenyane
- Hleoheng
- Khomokhoana
- Limamarela
- Linare
- Litjotjela
- Maisa-Phoka
- Malaoaneng
- Manka
- Matlameng
- Menkhoaneng
- Motati
- Mphorosane
- Pitseng
- Sephokong
- Serupane
- Seshote
- Tsoilitsoili

=== Mafeteng District ===
- Koti-Se-Phola
- Makaota
- 'Makholane
- 'Malakeng
- Malumeng
- 'Mamants'O
- Monyake
- Mathula
- Metsi-Maholo
- Qibing
- Ramoetsana
- Tajane

=== Maseru District ===
- Abia
- Likalaneng
- Lilala
- Lithabaneng
- Lithoteng
- Makheka
- Makhoarane
- Makhaleng
- Makolopetsane
- Manonyane
- Maseru Central
- Mazenod
- Mohlakeng
- Motimposo
- Nyakosoba
- Qiloane
- Qoaling
- Ratau
- Ribaneng
- Semonkong
- Stadium Area
- Telle

=== Mohale's Hoek District ===
- Khoelenya
- Likhutloaneng
- Mashaleng
- Mootsinyane
- Nkau
- Phamong
- Qabane
- Qhobeng
- Qobong
- Seroto
- Siloe
- Teke
- Thaba Mokhele

=== Mokhotlong District ===
- Khalahali
- Khubelu
- Linakaneng
- Liphamola
- Mapholaneng
- Marung
- Mateanong
- Matsoku
- Molika-Liko
- Moremoholo
- Pae-La-Itlhatsoa
- Popa
- Rafolatsane
- Sakeng
- Tekeseleng

=== Qacha's Nek District ===
- Khomo-Phatsoa
- Letloepe
- Maseepho
- Matebeng
- Mosenekeng
- Patlong
- Ramatšeliso
- Ratšoleli
- Thaba-Khubelu
- Thaba-Litšoene
- Whitehill

=== Quthing District ===
- Ha Nkoebe
- Likhohlong
- Liphakoe
- Matsatseng
- Mkhono
- Mokotjomela
- Mphaki
- Qomoqomong
- Seforong
- Tsatsane

=== Thaba-Tseka District ===
- Bokong
- Lesobeng
- Khutlo-Se-Metsi
- Litsoetse
- Linakeng
- Urban Council
