= Mokhotlong =

City in Lesotho

Coordinates: 29.288495°S 29.065568°E

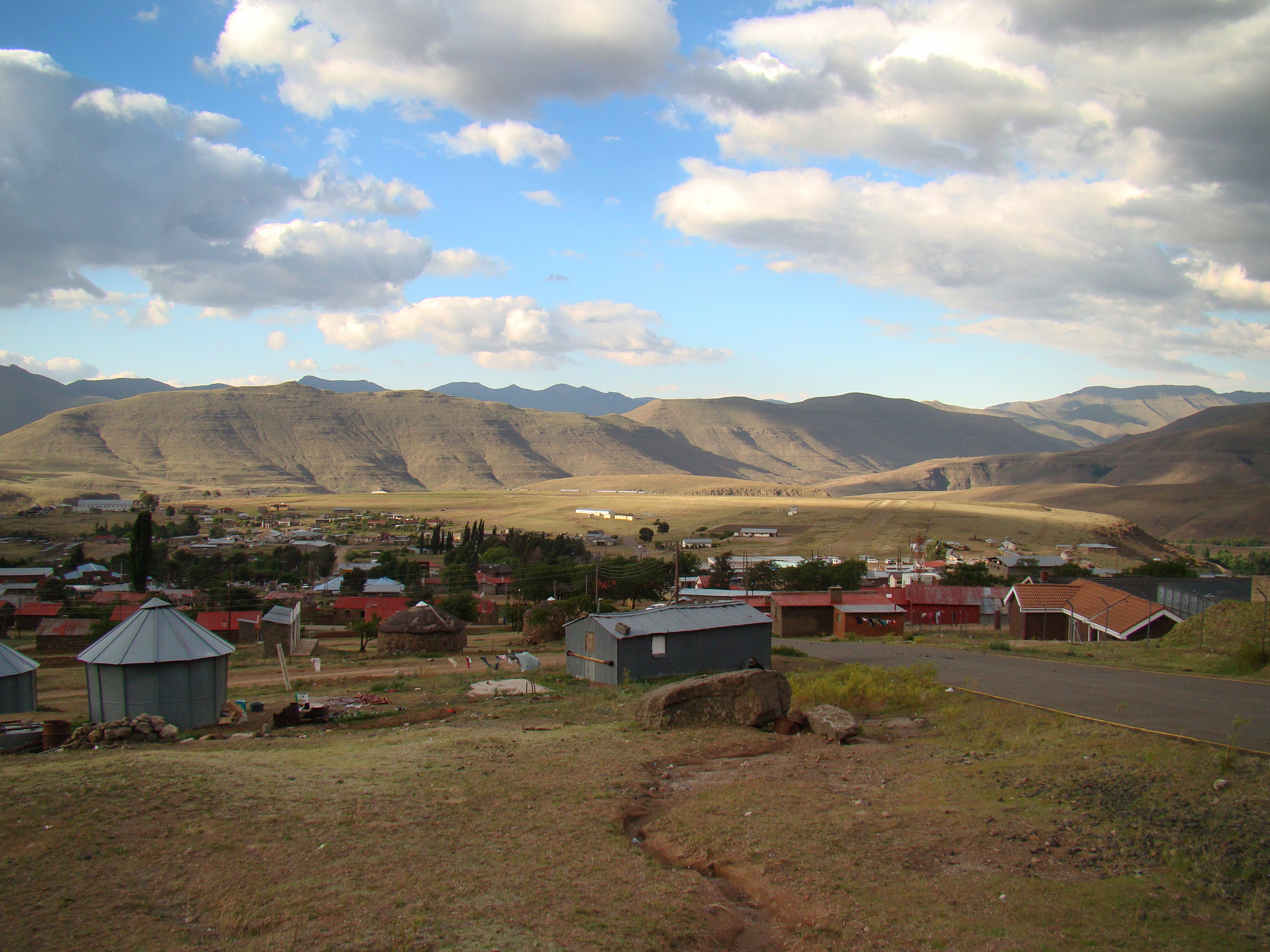
Mokhotlong centre and airport

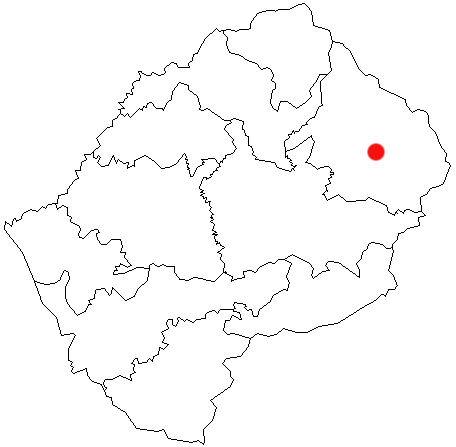
Location of Mokhotlong in Lesotho

Mokhotlong (Sotho: Mokhotlong) is a constituency, city and seat of Mokhotlong District in the mountainous northeastern part of Lesotho. It is the first major city with an airport along the road from South Africa across the Sani Pass, near the Maloti (Drakensberg in South Africa) Mountains. The name of the city is named in Sesotho, the language of the people of Lesotho, meaning "Place of the Bald Ibis." Thabana Ntlenyana, the highest point in southern Africa, is found in the district.

== History ==
Mokhotlong's role as a police post first brought people to this part of Lesotho in 1905. It developed into a trading centre for the people of the Highlands region. However, the settlement was preserved from major development by its separation from the rest of the country. Radio contact was first established with Maseru, the capital city, in 1947.

In the next few years an air strip was built at Mokhotlong and a road built through the town to link it to the rest of Lesotho. Despite improved communication links, Mokhotlong continued to be outfitted with provisions and supplies by pony trek from Natal Province via the Sani Pass.

== Geography and climate ==
An hour and a half drive north of Sani Pass, Mokhotlong is located 270 km from Maseru and 200 km from Butha-Buthe. The source of the Senqu River, Lesotho's largest river, is near Mokhotlong, impacting the landscape throughout the town and surrounding district.

Mokhotlong experiences a subtropical highland climate (Köppen climate classification Cwb) with warm summers and cool, dry winters.

Climate data for Mokhotlong (1981–2010)
Month	Jan	Feb	Mar	Apr	May	Jun	Jul	Aug	Sep	Oct	Nov	Dec	Year
Mean daily maximum °C (°F)	24.8 (76.6)	24.3 (75.7)	22.5 (72.5)	19.7 (67.5)	16.7 (62.1)	14.0 (57.2)	14.2 (57.6)	16.9 (62.4)	20.3 (68.5)	21.7 (71.1)	22.8 (73.0)	24.0 (75.2)	20.2 (68.3)
Mean daily minimum °C (°F)	11.2 (52.2)	10.7 (51.3)	9.0 (48.2)	5.8 (42.4)	2.7 (36.9)	−0.8 (30.6)	−1.1 (30.0)	1.5 (34.7)	5.3 (41.5)	7.4 (45.3)	8.7 (47.7)	10.2 (50.4)	5.9 (42.6)
Average rainfall mm (inches)	102.7 (4.04)	84.4 (3.32)	68.9 (2.71)	31.0 (1.22)	11.4 (0.45)	9.2 (0.36)	3.3 (0.13)	19.1 (0.75)	25.8 (1.02)	74.0 (2.91)	79.1 (3.11)	85.4 (3.36)	594.3 (23.38)
Average rainy days (≥ 0.5 mm)	14	13	11	7	3	2	1	3	3	10	11	13	91
Source: World Meteorological Organization

== Events and activities ==
In addition to regular activities, Mokhotlong hosts the annual High Altitude Summer Marathon at the end of the year. The route runs through the Maloti Mountains and is characterized by its views of surrounding mountains and villages. The route has many steep ascents and descents. There are also half marathon and 10k events, in addition to the full marathon.

Mokhotlong is also on the route of the annual Roof of Africa Rally, an off-road motorcycle rally. Finally, Mokhotlong is home to the highest-elevated diamond mine in the world, Letseng diamond mine, which can be toured, and is often frequented by local students as part of their course of study. Its diamonds have the highest per carat price of any kimberlite mine, and with the capacity to process more than 5 million tonnes a year and recover about 100,000 carats, it is the seventh largest in the world. Three of their diamonds are among the world's top twenty rough diamonds.

== Socio-economy ==
Mokhotlong's economy is primarily driven by livestock rearing and subsistence agriculture, though neither of these fully supports most families. Arable land in this mountainous region is a scarce resource. Agricultural production only sustains families from three to nine months of the year. Families cover the gap largely through livestock and remittances from employed family members. However, livestock distribution is skewed with 60% of the livestock owned by 10% of the population; approximately 35% of the community have no livestock. General income is small, given both poor educational opportunities and the high unemployment rate in Lesotho and in South Africa (especially this part of South Africa). Consequently, a large segment of the population is seriously poor. This is exacerbated by HIV/AIDS, which ravages the region. Despite its poverty, few aid organizations work in Mokhotlong. Touching Tiny Lives provides nutritional and medical support to vulnerable children. GROW works with villages to increase agricultural production, support OVC households to improve livelihoods, capacity building, climate change adaptation strategies, etc.

In Mokhotlong City, the Mokhotlong district capital, formal employment is boosted by the presence of government offices.

== Sources ==
- McCrea, Barbara; Pinchuck, Tony; Reid, Donald; Velton, Ross (2012). South Africa, Lesotho, & Swaziland: The Rough Guide. London: Penguin Books Ltd. ISBN 978-1-85828-460-6.
- Murray, Jon; Williams, Jeff; Everist, Richard (1998). South Africa, Lesotho, & Swaziland (3rd ed.). Hawthorn, Australia: Lonely Planet. ISBN 978-0-86442-508-9.
