= Seate =

Seate is a surname. Notable people with the surname include:

- Mike Seate (born 1965), American journalist
- Olga Seate, South African politician

== See also ==
- Seat
