= Mafeteng District =

Coordinates: 29°50′S 27°55′E

Mafeteng
- District
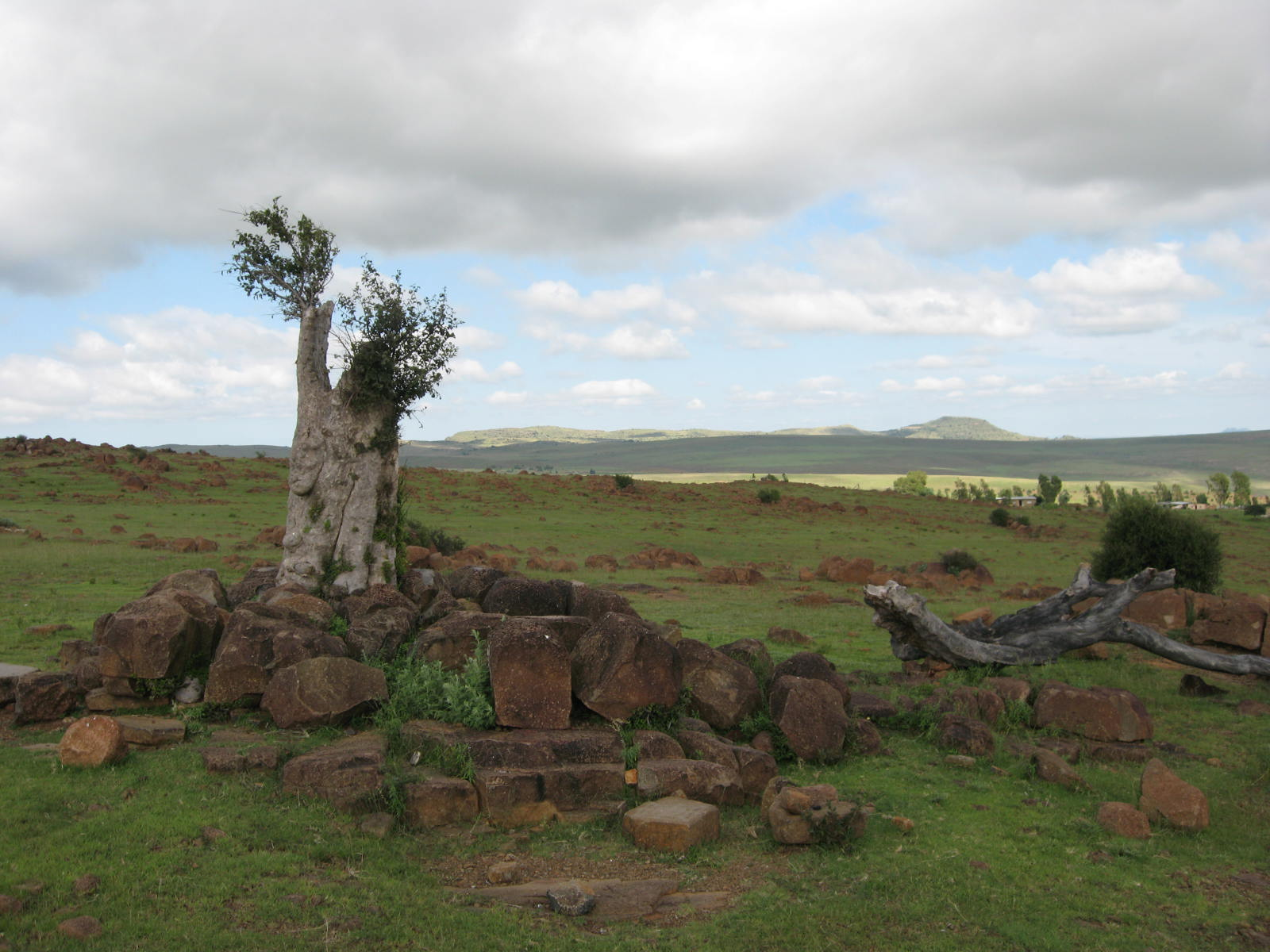
- Landscape near Ha Khopolo, Mafeteng

- Map of Lesotho with the district highlighted
- Country: Lesotho
- Capital: Mafeteng

Area
  - Total: 2,119 km^{2} (818 sq mi)

Population (2016)
  - Total: 178,222
  - Density: 84.11/km^{2} (217.8/sq mi)
- Time zone: UTC+2 (CAT)
- Area code: +266
- HDI (2019): 0.508 low · 6th

Mafeteng is a district of Lesotho. It has an area of 2,119 km^{2} and a population in 2016 of 178,222. Mafeteng is the capital of camptown, and only town in the district. In the west, Mafeteng borders on the Free State Province of South Africa. Domestically, it borders on the following districts Maseru District in the northeast and Mohale's Hoek District in the southeast.

As of 2006, the district had a population of 192,621 which was 10.26 per cent of the total population of the country. The total area of the district was 2,119 which was 6.98 per cent of the total area of the country. The density of population in the district was 91.00 per km^{2}. As of 2008, there were 49 per cent economically active people in the district. There were totally 127,664 employed people out of a total of 262,454 people in the district above 15 years of age.

== Demographics ==
As of 2006, the district had a population of 192,621, 10.26 per cent of the population of the country. The area of the district was 2,119, 6.98 per cent of the country. The population density in the district was 91.00 persons per square kilometre, compared to 62 for the country. There were nine constituencies and twelve community councils in the district. As of 2006, 546 people tested HIV positive, 21.60 per cent of the HIV-positive persons in the country. 222 of these (15.60%) were men; 324 (25.80%) were women.

== Geography ==
In the west, Mafeteng borders on the Free State Province of South Africa. Domestically, it borders on the following districts Maseru District in the northeast and Mohale's Hoek District in the southeast. The Western districts of Lesotho has predominantly low land zone with an elevation of 1,500 m (4,900 ft) 1,800 m (5,900 ft) above the sea level. These lands are the major agricultural zones in the country. The average annual rainfall in the country is 100 cm (39 in), most of which is received during the rainy season of October to April. Though it rains during all the months of the year, groundwater is limited on account of run-offs. The region has a temperate climate on account of the elevation and is humid during most parts of the year. The temperature in low lands vary from 32 °C (90 °F) to −7 °C (19 °F) in the winter.

Climate data for Mafeteng District
Month	Jan	Feb	Mar	Apr	May	Jun	Jul	Aug	Sep	Oct	Nov	Dec	Year
Mean daily maximum °C (°F)	27 (81)	27 (81)	24 (75)	21 (70)	19 (66)	15 (59)	15 (59)	19 (66)	21 (70)	26 (79)	27 (81)	28 (82)	22 (72)
Mean daily minimum °C (°F)	15 (59)	14 (57)	12 (54)	6 (43)	6 (43)	2 (36)	1 (34)	4 (39)	5 (41)	10 (50)	13 (55)	14 (57)	9 (47)
Average rainfall mm (inches)	142 (5.6)	40 (1.6)	115 (4.5)	51 (2.0)	32 (1.3)	44 (1.7)	0 (0)	4 (0.2)	0 (0)	17 (0.7)	116 (4.6)	68 (2.7)	627 (24.7)
Source 1:
Source 2:

== Economy ==
As of 2008, there were 49 per cent economically active people in the district. There were totally 127,664 employed people out of a total of 262,454 people in the district above 15 years of age. The employed population in the age group of 6–14 years was 2,372 out of a total of 75,748 people in the district in the age group. The labour force participation stood at 193.50. The number of people involved in subsistence agriculture is 1,866 and the number of people in other sectors was 506. The number of unemployed people in the district was 40,990 and the unemployment rate was 074. The total area planted in 2009 was 36,563 which formed 9.06 per cent of the total area planted in the country. The total production was 9,069 tonnes, which was 6.02 per cent of the totals in the country. The major crop was maize, while wheat, sorghum, beans and peas were the other crops planted. The total production of maize was 6,344 tonnes, beans was 129 tonnes, sorghum was 075 tonnes, peas was 1,737 tonnes and wheat was 784 tonnes as of 2008. As of 2007, there were a total of 215 km (134 mi) of paved roads in the district, with 193 km (120 mi) paved roads and 22 km (14 mi) of unpaved roads.

== Administration ==
The constituencies of Mafeteng District are Thaba-Phechela, Phoqoane, Matelile, Maliepetsane, Thabana-Morena, Qalabane and Mafeteng. The Community councils of Mafeteng District are Koti-Se-Phola, Makaota, 'Makholane, 'Malakeng, Malumeng, 'Mamantšo, Monyake, Mathula, Metsi-Maholo, Qibing, Ramoetsana and Tajane As per the 1968 Local Government Repeal Act - Development Committees Order No.9 of 1986, a District Development Committee (DDC) should have a set of Ward Development Committees (WDC) for each ward and Village Development Committees (VDC) under it. Each VDC has a set of seven elected members and the head would be an ex-officio member and chairman of the committee. The WDC is composed of twelve members elected from about VDCs, whose chairman would be and ex-officio member. The fifteen-membered DDC is elected by the members of WDC. When there are cases of more than one DDC, the chiefs would alternate in meetings. The district secretary co-ordinates the activities of the various committees. As per the Local Government Amendment Act 2004, the District Development Coordination Committee was established as the supreme body of district administration, under which all the district councils were branched. The urban and municipal councils were under each district council, which in turn had community councils under it. The Independent Electoral Commission (IEC) is responsible for the administration of the Local Government Elections. The nation's first local government elections were conducted in April 2005, while the most recent elections were held in October 2011. During these elections, 64 community councils, 11 urban councils and one municipal council were elected.
