= Thaba-Tseka District =

Coordinates: 29°30′S 28°40′E

Thaba-Tseka
- District
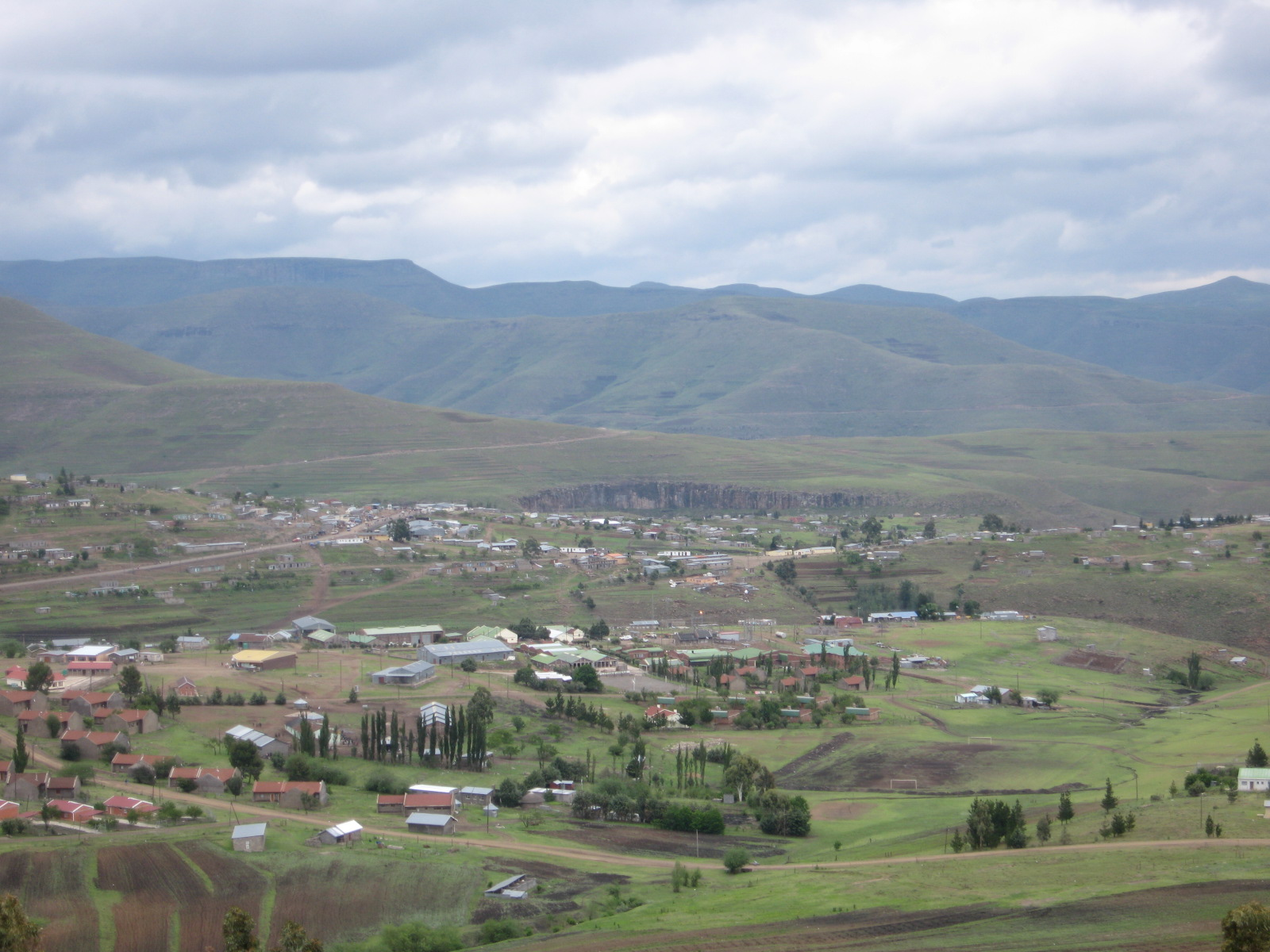
- Nickname: Lilala
- Map of Lesotho with the district highlighted
- Country: Lesotho
- Capital: Thaba-Tseka

Area
  - Total: 4,270 km^{2} (1,650 sq mi)

Population (2016)
  - Total: 135,347
  - Density: 31.7/km^{2} (82.1/sq mi)
- Time zone: UTC+2 (CAT)
- Area code: +266
- HDI (2019): 0.451 low · 10th

Thaba-Tseka is a district of Lesotho. Thaba-Tseka is also the name of the district's capital or camptown, which is the only town in the district. In the east, Thaba-Tseka borders on the KwaZulu-Natal Province of South Africa. Domestically, it borders on Mokhotlong District in northeast, Leribe District in north, Berea District in northwest, Maseru District in west, Mohale's Hoek District in southwest and Qacha's Nek District in the southern direction. The district is one of the major tourist attractions in Lesotho because of the second largest arch dam in Africa Katse Dam.

As of 2016, the district had a population of 135,347 which was 6.92 per cent of the total population of the country. The total area of the district was 4,270 which was 14.07 per cent of the total area of the country. The density of population in the district was 30.00 per km^{2}. As of 2008, there were 38 per cent economically active people in the district. There were totally 77,836 employed people out of a total of 156,640 people in the district above 15 years of age.

== Demographics ==
As of 2006, the district had a population of 129,881, 6.92 per cent of the population of the country. The total area of the district was 4,270, 14.07 per cent of the country. The population density in the district was 30.00 persons per square kilometre, compared to the 62 for the country. There were five constituencies and thirteen community councils in the district. As of 2006, 295 people tested HIV positive, 18.20 per cent of the HIV-positive persons in the country. 116 of these (14.50%) were men; 179 (20.50%) were women.

== Economy ==
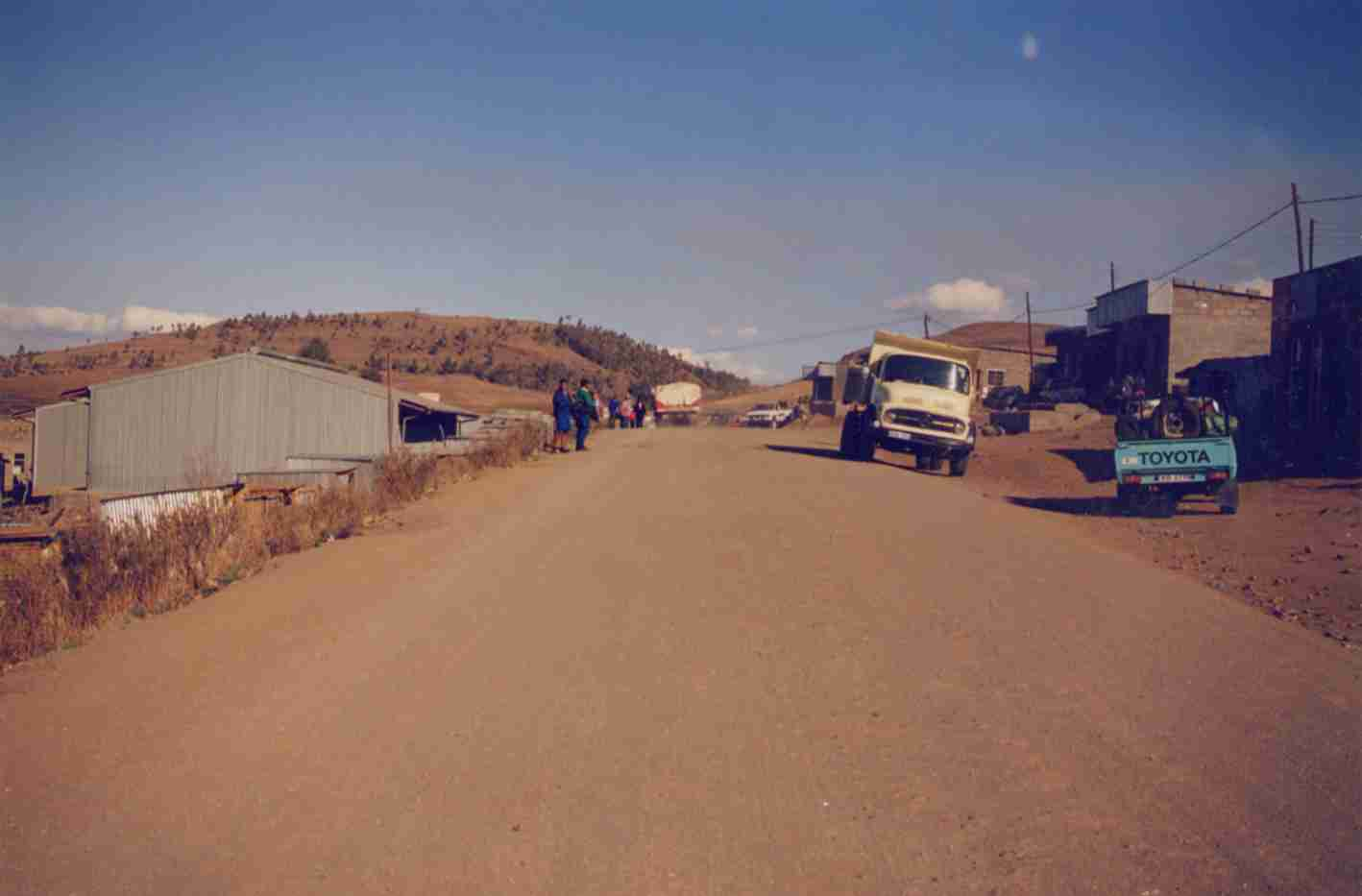
Thaba-Tseka district road

As of 2008, there were 38 per cent economically active people in the district. There were totally 77,836 employed people out of a total of 156,640 people in the district above 15 years of age. The employed population in the age group of 6–14 years was 2,578 out of a total of 51,962 people in the district in the age group. The labour force participation stood at 190.50. The number of people involved in subsistence agriculture is 1,828 and the number of people in other sectors was 750. The number of unemployed people in the district was 21,212 and the unemployment rate was 064. The total area planted in 2009 was 23,333 which formed 5.78 per cent of the total area planted in the country. The total production was 7,808 tonnes, which was 5.19 per cent of the totals in the country. The major crop was maize, while wheat, sorghum, beans and peas were the other crops planted. The total production of maize was 5,720 tonnes, beans was 318 tonnes, sorghum was 285 tonnes, peas was 775 tonnes and wheat was 710 tonnes as of 2008.

== Administration ==
Community councils of Thaba-Tseka District are Bokong, Khutlo-se-Metsi, Linakeng, Tenesolo, Litsoetse and Thaba Tseka Urban. Constituencies of Thaba-Tseka District are Mantšonyane, Mashai, Semena, Thaba-Moea and Thaba-Tseka. As per the 1968 Local Government Repeal Act - Development Committees Order No.9 of 1986, a District Development Committee (DDC) should have a set of Ward Development Committees (WDC) for each ward and Village Development Committees (VDC) under it. Each VDC has a set of seven elected members and the head would be an ex-officio member and chairman of the committee. The WDC is composed of twelve members elected from about VDCs, whose chairman would be and ex-officio member. The fifteen-membered DDC is elected by the members of WDC. When there are cases of more than one DDC, the chiefs would alternate in meetings. The district secretary co-ordinates the activities of the various committees. As per the Local Government Amendment Act 2004, the District Development Coordination Committee was established as the supreme body of district administration, under which all the district councils were branched. The urban and municipal councils were under each district council, which in turn had community councils under it. The Independent Electoral Commission (IEC) is responsible for the administration of the Local Government Elections. The nation's first local government elections were conducted in April 2005, while the most recent elections were held in October 2011. During these elections, 64 community councils, 11 urban councils and one municipal council were elected.

== Geography ==
In the east, Thaba-Tseka borders on most of Lesotho districts, namely, Mokhotlong District in northeast, Leribe District in north, Maseru District in west, Mohale's Hoek District in southwest, Qacha's Nek District in the southern direction. The Eastern districts of Lesotho has predominantly low land zone with an elevation of 1,500 m (4,900 ft) 1,800 m (5,900 ft) above the sea level. These lands are not the major agricultural zones in the country, compared to the Western counterparts. The average annual rainfall in the country is 100 cm (39 in), most of which is received during the rainy season of October to April. Though it rains during all the months of the year, groundwater is limited on account of run-offs. The region has a temperate climate on account of the elevation and is humid during most parts of the year. The temperature in low lands vary from 32 °C (90 °F) to −7 °C (19 °F) in the winter.

Climate data for Thaba-Tseka District
Month	Jan	Feb	Mar	Apr	May	Jun	Jul	Aug	Sep	Oct	Nov	Dec	Year
Mean daily maximum °C (°F)	23 (73)	24 (75)	20 (68)	17 (63)	16 (61)	13 (55)	13 (55)	17 (63)	19 (66)	23 (73)	23 (73)	24 (75)	19 (67)
Mean daily minimum °C (°F)	11 (52)	11 (52)	8 (46)	4 (39)	4 (39)	1 (34)	0 (32)	5 (41)	5 (41)	9 (48)	10 (50)	11 (52)	7 (44)
Average rainfall mm (inches)	99 (3.9)	47 (1.9)	98 (3.9)	33 (1.3)	14 (0.6)	33 (1.3)	0 (0)	5 (0.2)	17 (0.7)	42 (1.7)	104 (4.1)	151 (5.9)	641 (25.2)
Source 1:
Source 2:
