= Qacha's Nek District =

Coordinates: 30°00′S 28°45′E

Qacha's Nek
- District
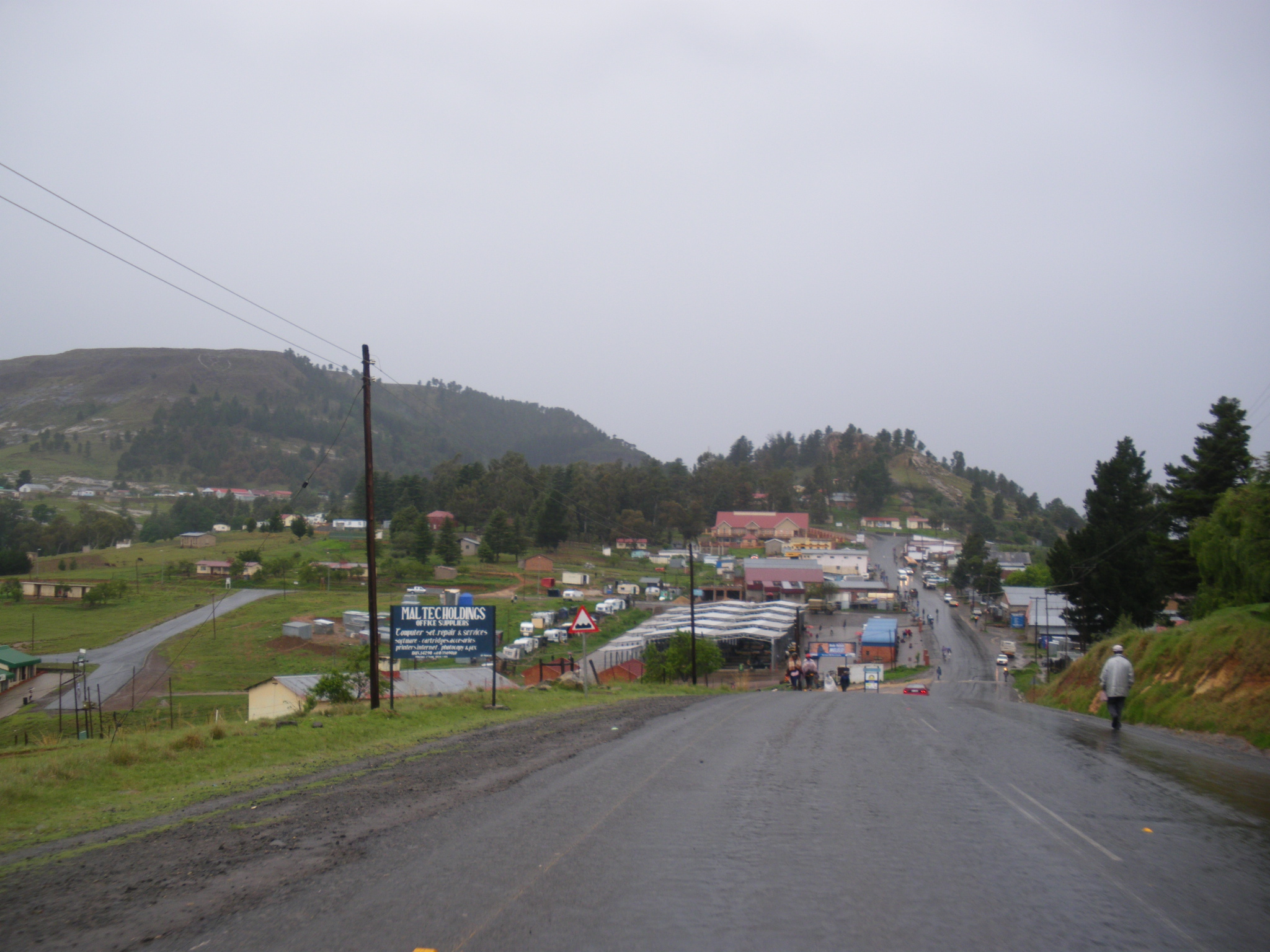
- Qacha's Nek

- Map of Lesotho with the district highlighted
- Country: Lesotho
- Capital: Qacha's Nek

Government
  - District Council Chair: Mr. Thabo Thatho

Area
  - Total: 2,349 km^{2} (907 sq mi)

Population (2016)
  - Total: 74,566
  - Density: 31.74/km^{2} (82.22/sq mi)
- Time zone: UTC+2 (CAT)
- Area code: +266
- Vehicle registration: H
- HDI (2019): 0.492 low · 7th

Qacha's Nek is a district of Lesotho. Qacha's Nek is the capital or camptown, and the only town in the district. In the south, Qacha's Nek borders on the Eastern Cape Province of South Africa, and it has a short border with KwaZulu-Natal Province in the far east. Domestically, it borders on Quthing District in southwest, Mohale's Hoek District in west and Thaba-Tseka District in the northern direction.

As of 2006, the district had a population of 69,749 which was 3.72 per cent of the total population of the country. The total area of the district was 2,349 which was 7.74 per cent of the total area of the country. The density of population in the district was 30.00 per km^{2}. As of 2008, there were economically active people in the district. There were totally 53,126 employed people out of a total of 100,776 people in the district above 15 years of age. The total area planted in 2009 was 10,168 which formed 2.52 per cent of the total area planted in the country. The total production was 3,278 tonnes, which was 2.18 per cent of the totals in the country, with maize being the major crop.

== Demographics ==
As of 2006, the district had a population of 69,749, 3.72 per cent of the population of the country. The area of the district was 2,349, 7.74 per cent of the country. The population density in the district was 30.00 persons per square kilometre, compared to 62 for the country. There were three constituencies and size community councils in the district. As of 2006, 168 people tested HIV positive, 20.60 per cent of the HIV-positive persons in the country. 69 of these (13.90%) were men; 99 (25.20%) were women.

== Economy ==
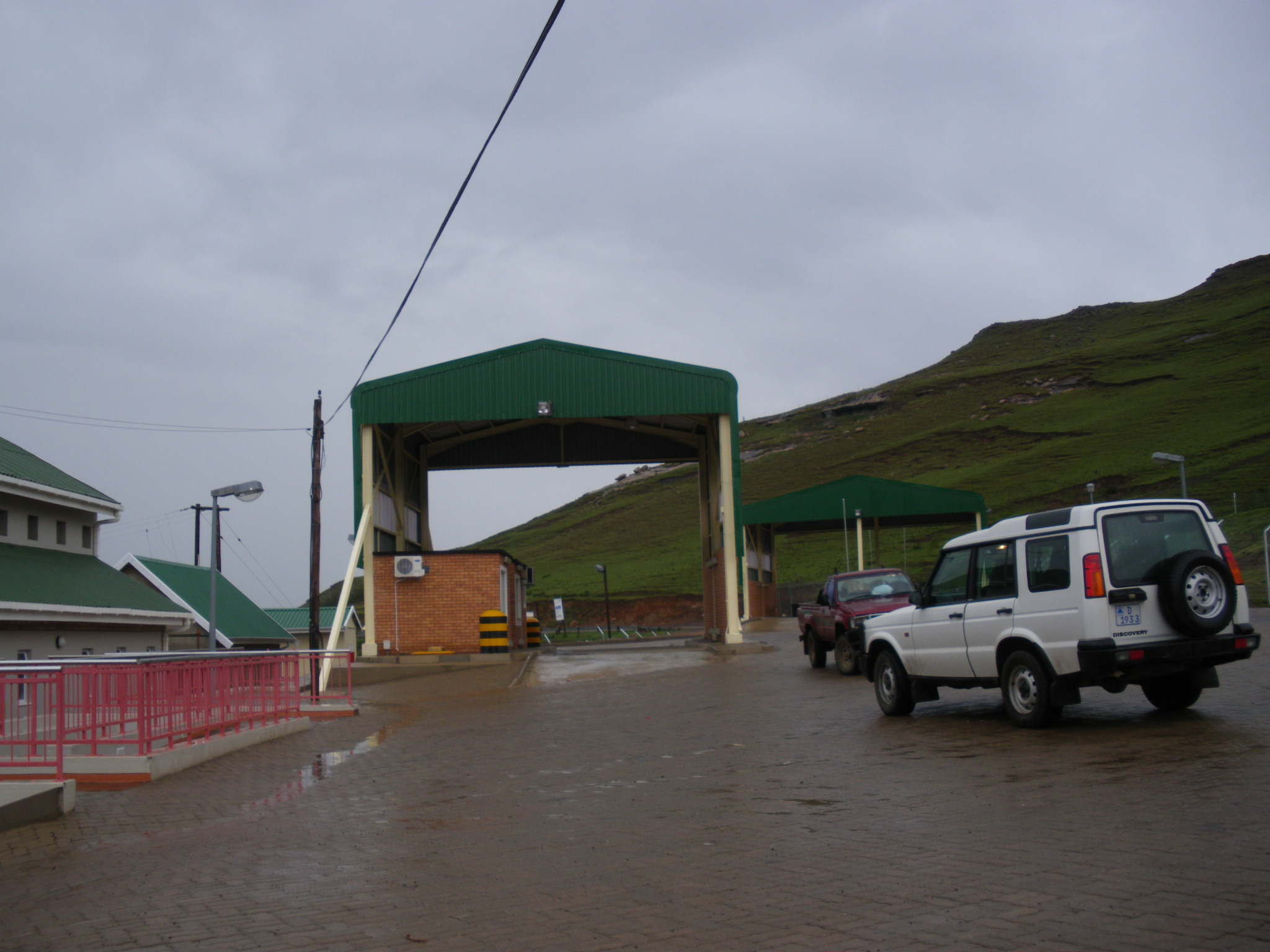
Border checkpoint in the district

As of 2008, there were economically active people in the district. There were totally 53,126 employed people out of a total of 100,776 people in the district above 15 years of age. The employed population in the age group of 6–14 years was 968 out of a total of 27,368 people in the district in the age group. The labour force participation stood at 192.90. The number of people involved in subsistence agriculture is 830 and the number of people in other sectors was 138. The number of unemployed people in the district was 11,280 and the unemployment rate was 053. The total area planted in 2009 was 10,168 which formed 2.52 per cent of the total area planted in the country. The total production was 3,278 tonnes, which was 2.18 per cent of the totals in the country. The major crop was maize, while wheat, sorghum, beans and peas were the other crops planted. The total production of maize was 2,567 tonnes, beans was 200 tonnes, sorghum was 001 tonnes, peas was 102 tonnes and wheat was 408 tonnes as of 2008. As of 2007, there were a total of 137 km (85 mi) of paved roads in the district, with 127 km (79 mi) paved roads and 10 km (6.2 mi) of unpaved roads.

== Geography ==
In the south, Qacha's Nek borders on the Eastern Cape Province of South Africa, and it has a short border with KwaZulu-Natal Province in the far east. Domestically, it borders on the following districts, namely, Quthing District in southwest, Mohale's Hoek District in west and Thaba-Tseka District in the northern direction. The Eastern districts of Lesotho has predominantly low land zone with an elevation of 1,500 m (4,900 ft) 1,800 m (5,900 ft) above the sea level. These lands are not the major agricultural zones in the country, compared to the Western counterparts. The average annual rainfall in the country is 100 cm (39 in), most of which is received during the rainy season of October to April. Though it rains during all the months of the year, groundwater is limited on account of run-offs. The region has a temperate climate on account of the elevation and is humid during most parts of the year. The temperature in low lands vary from 32 °C (90 °F) to −7 °C (19 °F) in the winter.

Climate data for Qacha's Nek District
Month	Jan	Feb	Mar	Apr	May	Jun	Jul	Aug	Sep	Oct	Nov	Dec	Year
Mean daily maximum °C (°F)	24 (75)	25 (77)	22 (72)	18 (64)	18 (64)	15 (59)	16 (61)	19 (66)	22 (72)	24 (75)	25 (77)	26 (79)	21 (70)
Mean daily minimum °C (°F)	13 (55)	13 (55)	11 (52)	6 (43)	7 (45)	4 (39)	4 (39)	0 (32)	7 (45)	9 (48)	11 (52)	13 (55)	8 (47)
Average rainfall mm (inches)	135 (5.3)	120 (4.7)	114 (4.5)	71 (2.8)	7 (0.3)	32 (1.3)	0 (0)	0 (0)	38 (1.5)	19 (0.7)	78 (3.1)	128 (5.0)	741 (29.2)
Source 1:
Source 2:

== Administration ==
Constituencies of Qacha's Nek District are Lebakeng, Qacha's Nek and Tsoelike. The community councils of Qacha's Nek District are Qacha's Nek urban council (HUC), Qanya (H01), Nts'upe (H02) and Tsoelikana (H03) As per the 1968 Local Government Repeal Act - Development Committees Order No.9 of 1986, a District Development Committee (DDC) should have a set of Ward Development Committees (WDC) for each ward and Village Development Committees (VDC) under it. Each VDC has a set of seven elected members and the head would be an ex-officio member and chairman of the committee. The WDC is composed of twelve members elected from about VDCs, whose chairman would be and ex-officio member. The fifteen-membered DDC is elected by the members of WDC. When there are cases of more than one DDC, the chiefs would alternate in meetings. The district secretary co-ordinates the activities of the various committees. As per the Local Government Amendment Act 2004, the District Development Coordination Committee was established as the supreme body of district administration, under which all the district councils were branched. The urban and municipal councils were under each district council, which in turn had community councils under it. The Independent Electoral Commission (IEC) is responsible for the administration of the Local Government Elections. The nation's first local government elections were conducted in April 2005, while the most recent elections were held in October 2011. During these elections, 64 community councils, 11 urban councils and one municipal council were elected.
