= Mokhotlong District =

Coordinates: 29°20′S 29°00′E

Mokhotlong
- District
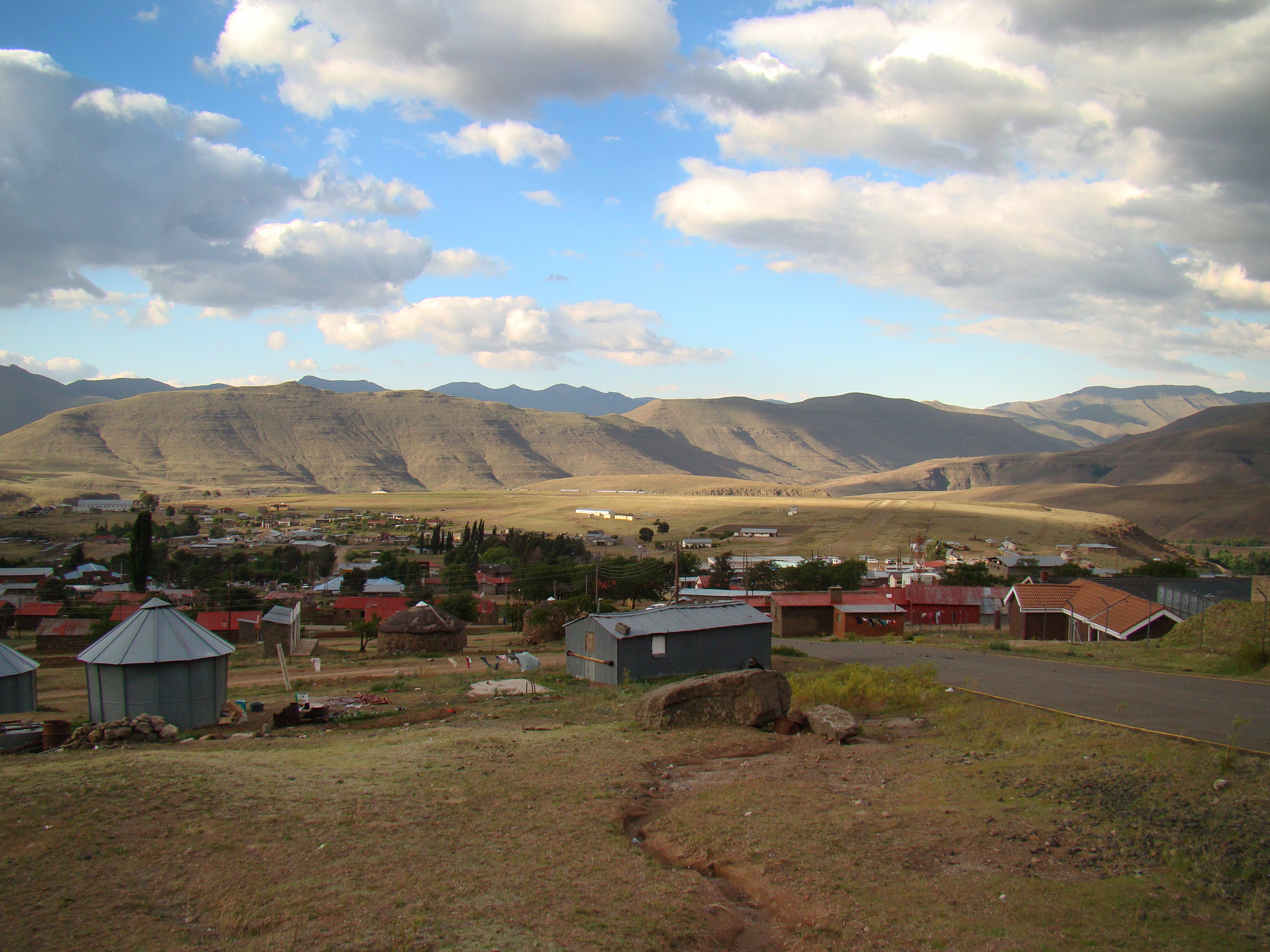
- Mokhotlong Airport

- Map of Lesotho with the district highlighted
- Country: Lesotho
- Capital: Mokhotlong

Government

Area
  - Total: 4,075 km^{2} (1,573 sq mi)
- Elevation: 2,512 m (8,241 ft)

Population (2016)
  - Total: 100,442
  - Density: 24.65/km^{2} (63.84/sq mi)
- Time zone: UTC+2 (CAT)
- Area code: +266
- HDI (2019): 0.461 low · 9th

Mokhotlong (in Sesotho language "the place of the bald ibis") is a district of Lesotho. It includes the highest terrain in the Maloti Mountains and the source of the Senqu River, Lesotho's primary watershed. Mokhotlong is the capital or camptown, and only town in the district. Mokhotlong borders on the KwaZulu-Natal Province of South Africa, with its north point bordering the Free State Province. Domestically, it borders on Butha-Buthe District in northwest, Leribe District in west, and Thaba-Tseka District in the south.

As of 2006, the district had a population of 97,713 which was 5.21 per cent of the total population of the country. The total area of the district was 4,075 which was 13.42 per cent of the total area of the country. The density of population in the district was 24.00 per km^{2}. The total area planted in crops in 2009 was 16,420 hectares, which formed 4.07 per cent of the total area planted in crops in the country. The total agricultural production was 8,757 tonnes, which was 5.82 per cent of the total agricultural production in the country.

== Demographics ==
As of 2006, the district had a population of 97,713, 5.21 per cent of the population of the country. The area of the district was 4,075, 13.42 per cent of the country. The population density was 24.00 persons per square kilometre, compared to 62 for the country as a whole. There were four constituencies and fifteen community councils in the district. As of 2006, 250 people tested HIV positive, 17.70 of the HIV positive persons in the country. 97 of these (13.00%) were men; 153 (20.60%) were women.

== Economy ==
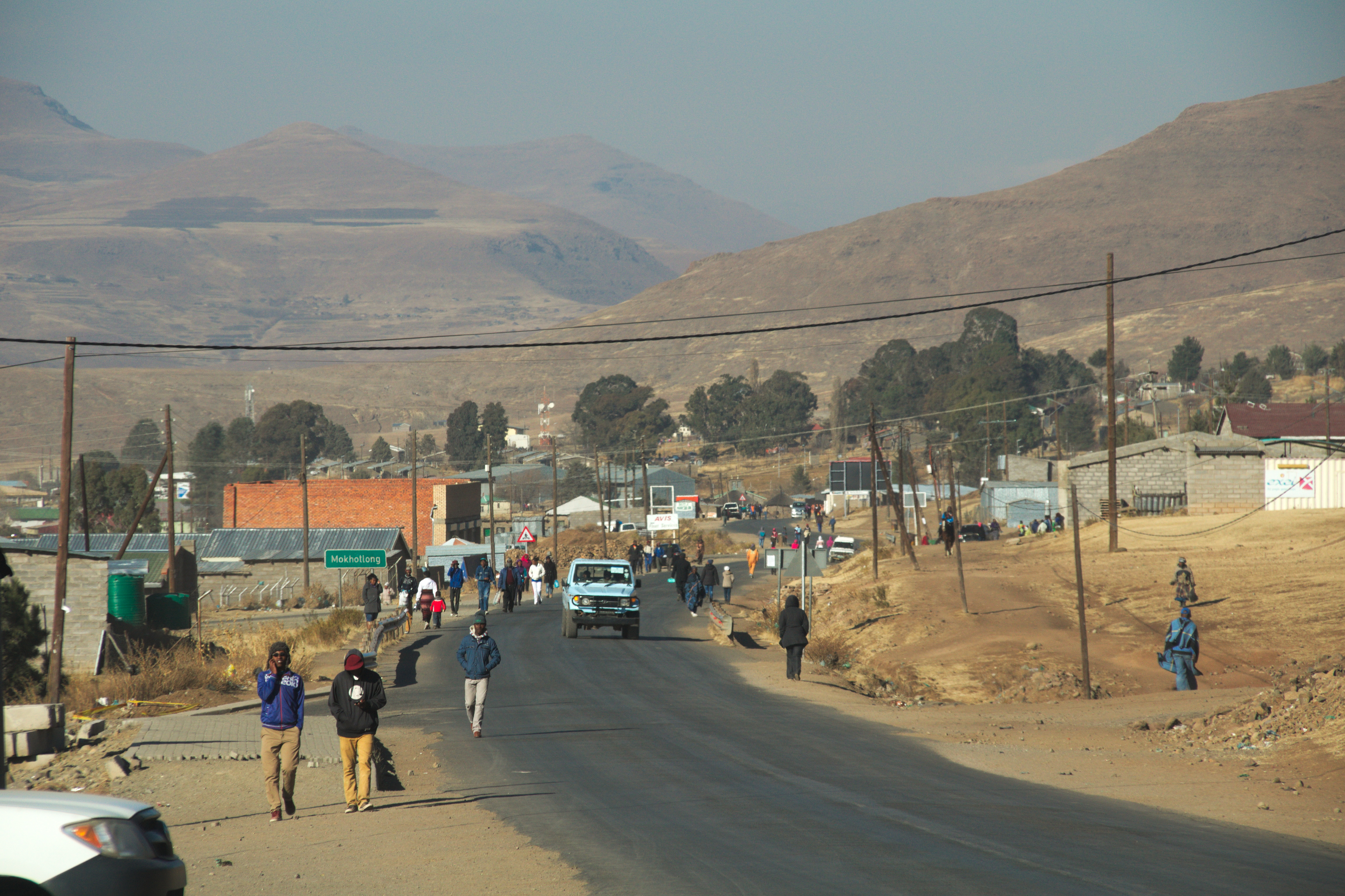
A market in the district

As of 2008, there were economically active people in the district: there were 66,290 employed people out of a total of 134,871 people in the district above 15 years of age. The employed population in the age group of 6–14 years was 4,042 out of a total of 37,468 people in the district in the age group. The labour force participation stood at 181.10. The number of people involved in subsistence agriculture is 2,958 and the number of people in other sectors was 1,084. The number of unemployed people in the district was 14,382 and the unemployment rate was 054. The total area planted in 2009 was 16,420 which formed 4.07 per cent of the total area planted in the country. The total production was 8,757 tonnes, which was 5.82 per cent of the totals in the country. The major crop was maize, while wheat, sorghum, beans and peas were the other crops planted. The total production of maize was 6,508 tonnes, beans was 877 tonnes, sorghum was 355 tonnes, peas was 178 tonnes and wheat was 839 tonnes as of 2008.

== Geography ==
In the east, Mokhotlong borders on the KwaZulu-Natal Province of South Africa, with its north point bordering the Free State Province. Domestically, it borders on the following districts, namely, Butha-Buthe District in northwest, Leribe District in west, and Thaba-Tseka District in the south. It is traversed by the northwesterly line of equal latitude and longitude. The Eastern districts of Lesotho has predominantly low land zone with an elevation of 1,500 m (4,900 ft) 1,800 m (5,900 ft) above the sea level. These lands are not the major agricultural zones in the country, compared to the Western counterparts. The average annual rainfall in the country is 100 cm (39 in), most of which is received during the rainy season of October to April. Though it rains during all the months of the year, groundwater is limited on account of run-offs. The region has a temperate climate (Cwb) on account of the elevation and is humid during most parts of the year. The temperature in low lands vary from 32 °C (90 °F) to −7 °C (19 °F) in the winter.

Climate data for Mokhotlong District
Month	Jan	Feb	Mar	Apr	May	Jun	Jul	Aug	Sep	Oct	Nov	Dec	Year
Mean daily maximum °C (°F)	25 (77)	24 (75)	22 (72)	18 (64)	17 (63)	15 (59)	15 (59)	19 (66)	22 (72)	26 (79)	26 (79)	25 (77)	21 (70)
Mean daily minimum °C (°F)	12 (54)	11 (52)	8 (46)	3 (37)	2 (36)	−2 (28)	−3 (27)	8 (46)	3 (37)	8 (46)	10 (50)	11 (52)	6 (43)
Average rainfall mm (inches)	114 (4.5)	97 (3.8)	81 (3.2)	19 (0.7)	5 (0.2)	28 (1.1)	0 (0)	8 (0.3)	34 (1.3)	15 (0.6)	65 (2.6)	173 (6.8)	638 (25.1)
Source 1:
Source 2:

== Administration ==
Constituencies of Mokhotlong District include Bobatsi, Malingoaneng, Mokhotlong and Senqu. The community councils of Mokhotlong District are Seate, Mphokojoane, Menoaneng, Sanqebethu and Mokhotlong Urban Council. As per the 1968 Local Government Repeal Act - Development Committees Order No.9 of 1986, a District Development Committee (DDC) should have a set of Ward Development Committees (WDC) for each ward and Village Development Committees (VDC) under it. Each VDC has a set of seven elected members and the head would be an ex-officio member and chairman of the committee. The WDC is composed of twelve members elected from about VDCs, whose chairman serves as an ex-officio member. The fifteen-membered DDC is elected by the members of WDC. When there are cases of more than one DDC, the chiefs would alternate in meetings. The district secretary co-ordinates the activities of the various committees. As per the Local Government Amendment Act 2004, the District Development Coordination Committee was established as the supreme body of district administration, under which all the district councils were branched. The urban and municipal councils were under each district council, which in turn had community councils under it.

The Independent Electoral Commission (IEC) is responsible for the administration of the Local Government Elections. The nation's first local government elections were conducted in April 2005, while the most recent elections were held in October 2011. During these elections, 64 community councils, 11 urban councils and one municipal council were elected.

== Notable people ==
- Likeleli Tampane (living), Mosotho politician born in Mabuleng, Mokhotolong district
