= Polihali Dam =

Dam in Lesotho

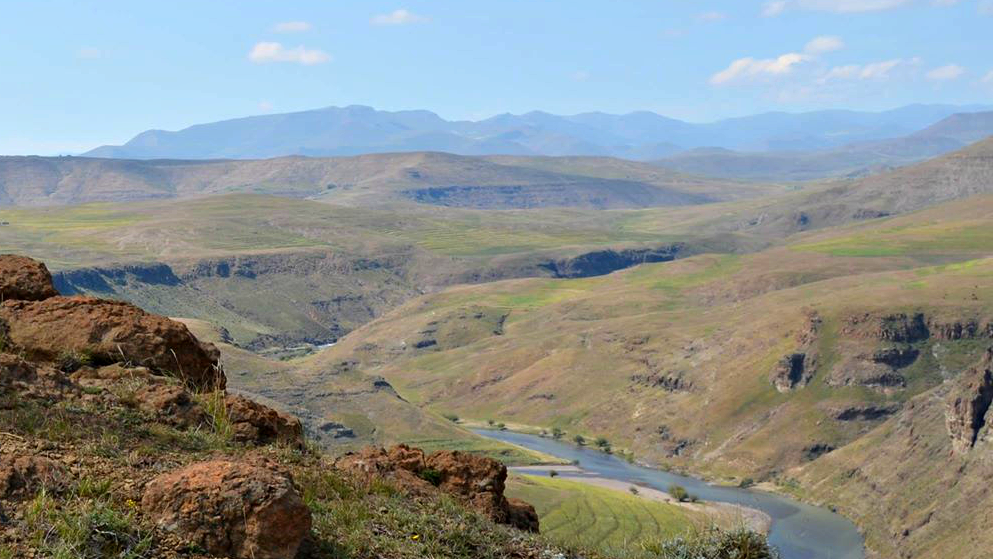
- Polihali Dam site location in Mokhotlong
- Interactive map of Polihali Dam
- Official name: Polihali
- Location: Lesotho
- Coordinates: 29.29°S 28.85°E
- Construction began: August 2023
- Opening date: 2028 (planned)
- Construction cost: M 7.68 billion
- Built by: Sinohydro Bureau 8 & 14 (China); Unik Civil Engineering (South Africa); Nthane Brothers (Lesotho)

Dam and spillways
- Type of dam: Concrete faced rock-fill
- Impounds: Senqu River
- Height: 165 m (541 ft)
- Width (crest): 915 metres (3,002 ft)

Reservoir
- Total capacity: 2,325 million m^{3}
- Normal elevation: 1,940 m (6,360 ft) above sea level

The Polihali Dam is a concrete faced rock-fill dam under construction in Lesotho. It is the third dam, under the Phase II of the series of dams of the proposed Lesotho Highlands Water Project (LHWP), which will eventually include five large dams in remote rural areas of Lesotho and South Africa. The Polihali Transfer Tunnel, which will link this dam to the Katse Dam (the focal point of the LHWP), spans a length of 38 kilometers with a nominal bore of five metres. This tunnel will convey water via gravity from the Polihali reservoir to the Katse reservoir. From Katse, water is then conveyed to Phase I's Muela Hydropower Station and subsequently directed to the As River en route to Gauteng, South Africa.

== Development ==
The second phase of the Lesotho Highlands Water Project encompasses the construction of the Polihali Dam, the Polihali Transfer Tunnel, the Oxbow Hydropower Scheme, and three major bridges. Adding 2.3 billion cubic meters in storage capacity, it will elevate the annual supply rate from 780 to 1270 million cubic meters, meeting South Africa's water demands while enhancing Lesotho's power generation capacity.

The awarding of construction contracts for the Polihali Dam (approx. M7.68 billion), Polihali Tunnel (approx. M9.2 billion), and Senqu Bridge (the largest of the three major bridges planned) occurred in late 2022. The majority of the funds needed for this second phase will be sourced from South Africa's financial markets by the Trans Caledon Tunnel Authority. The procurement for the design and construction supervision of the Oxbow Hydropower Scheme has started with March 2023, as deadline for the submission of bids of engineering, environmental and social consultants.

The construction of the Polihali Dam and the subsequent filling of the reservoir will encompass more than 5,000 hectares of land bordering the Senqu and Khubela rivers. Around 270 families will undergo resettlement. Initial resettlement homes in the Mokhotlong district were delivered in early April 2023, with further resettlements to follow as new residences are completed. Amnesty International warns that the Polihali Dam project could displace nearly 8,000 people from 35 villages, threatening their homes and livelihoods. The organization calls on the Lesotho authorities to ensure that any evictions related to the Polihali Dam project are carried out in accordance with international human rights standards. Additionally, numerous local news articles have highlighted the complaints of residents. These concerns encompass the compensation provided for their land, the handling of their animals that wandered into the construction zone, and the low wages given to local laborers.

"I would like to emphasise that the Lesotho Highlands Water Project is more than just a water project. It is a beacon of hope, a symbol of progress, a symbol of international cooperation, and a testament to the strength of bilateral relations between the Kingdom of Lesotho and the Republic of South Africa. We are determined that this massive trans-border project should equally benefit the peoples of Lesotho and South Africa. In addition to the royalties Lesotho receives from the Lesotho Highlands Water Project, local jobs have been created and new roads have been built in the Kingdom. Both Phase I and II include the construction of hydropower facilities to provide electricity for Lesotho. It has been critical for us as both Lesotho and South Africa that all communities affected by the construction of the Polihali Dam were consulted, that there should be fair compensation and relocation to alternative housing nearby."

— President Ramaphosa's speech during the launch of Phase 2 of the LHWP at Polihali

In May 2023, Lesotho's King Letsie III and South Africa's President Cyril Ramaphosa officially launched the project. Months later, the Lesotho Highlands Development Authority (LHDA) reported that on Friday, 4 August 2023, the team successfully diverted the Senqu River through the pre-cofferdam. The purpose of the pre-cofferdam is to channel the river through diversion tunnels, ensuring the safe construction of both the cofferdam and the main dam foundations. The goal is to finish the cofferdam by late October 2023, followed by the commencement of work on the main dam.

== See also ==
- Lesotho Highlands
- Lesotho Highlands Water Project
- Katse Dam
- Mohale Dam
