= Geography of Lesotho =

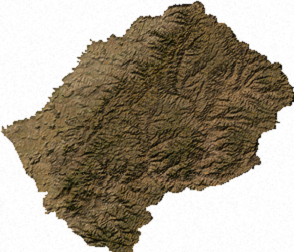
- Continent: Africa
- Region: Southern Africa
- Coordinates: 29°30′S 28°30′E
- Area: Ranked 141st
  - Total: 30,355 km^{2} (11,720 sq mi)
  - Land: 100%
  - Water: 0%
- Coastline: 0 km (0 mi)
- Borders: Total land borders: 909 km (565 mi); South Africa: 909 km (565 mi)
- Highest point: Thabana Ntlenyana; 3,482 m (11,424 ft)
- Lowest point: Junction of the Orange and Makhaleng Rivers; 1,400 m (4,593.2 ft)

Lesotho is a mountainous, landlocked country located in Southern Africa. It is an enclave, surrounded by South Africa. The total length of the country's borders is 909 kilometres (565 mi). Lesotho covers an area of around 30,355 square kilometres (11,720 sq mi), of which a negligible percentage is covered with water.

Lesotho is the only independent state in the world that lies entirely above 1,000 metres (3,281 ft) in elevation. Its lowest point is at 1,400 metres (4,593 ft), the highest low point of any country. Because of its elevation, the country's climate is cooler than in most other regions at the same latitude. Its climate zone can be classified as continental.

== Location ==
Lesotho is a country in Southern Africa, located at around 29°30' south latitude and 28°30' east longitude. It is the 141st largest country in the world, with a total land area of 30,355 square kilometres (11,720 sq mi), of which a negligible percentage is covered with water. Lesotho is completely surrounded by South Africa, making it one of only three countries in the world that are enclaved within another country; the other two are San Marino and Vatican City, both located within Italy. The total length of the South African border is 909 kilometres (565 mi). Lesotho's status as an enclave also means that it is landlocked and largely dependent on South Africa. The nearest major shipping port is Durban.

== Physical geography ==
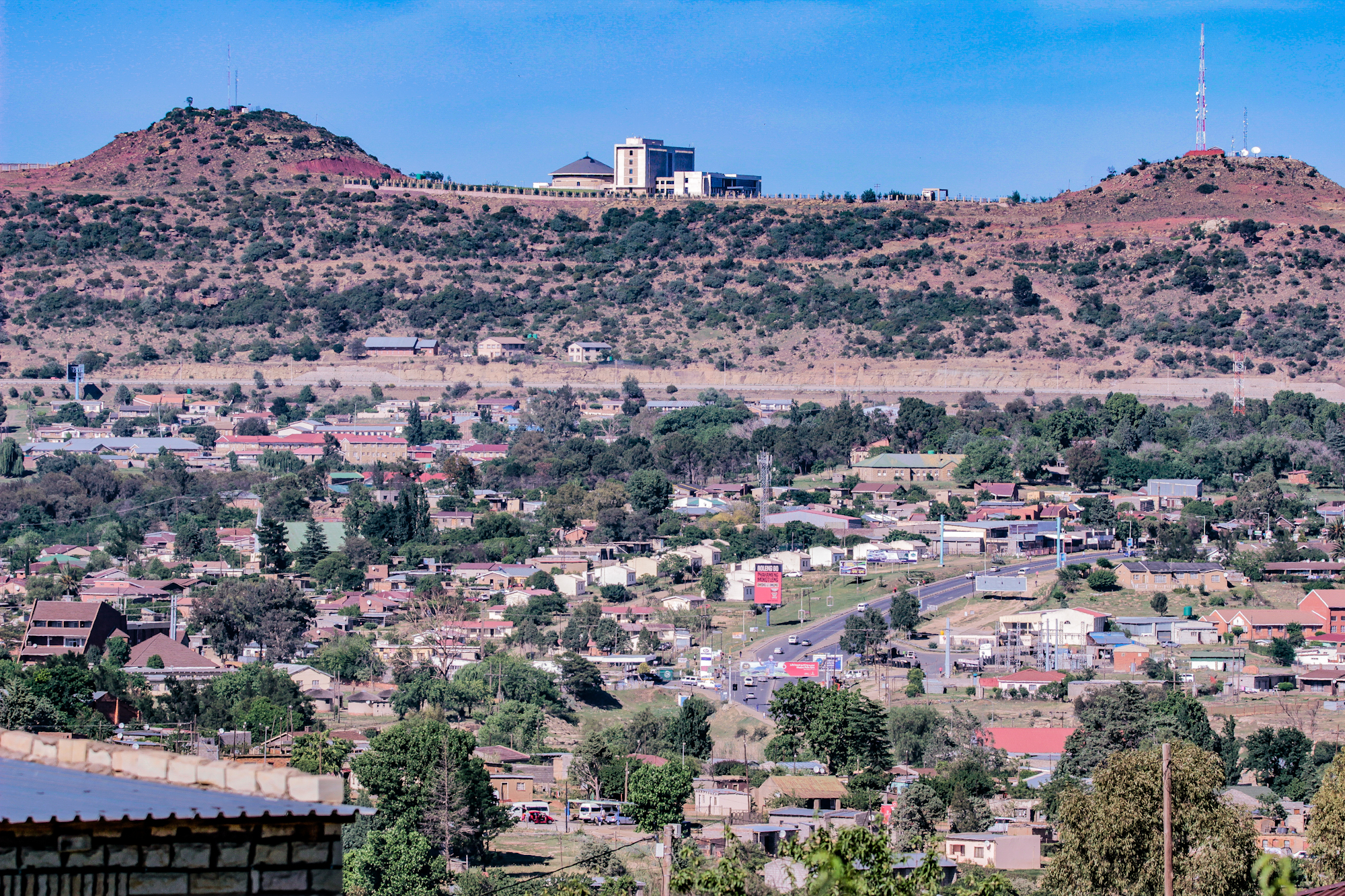
Maseru capital to town

Lesotho can be roughly divided into three geographic regions: the lowlands, following the southern banks of the Caledon River, and in the Senqu river valley; the highlands formed by the Drakensberg and Maloti mountain ranges in the east and central parts of the country; and the foothills that form a divide between the lowlands and the highlands. The lowest elevation in the country is at the junction of the Makhaleng and Orange (Senqu) rivers (at the South African border), which at 1,400 metres (4,593 ft) is the highest lowest point of any country. Lesotho is the only independent state in the world that lies entirely above 1,000 metres (3,281 ft) in elevation. The highest point is the peak of the Thabana Ntlenyana mountain, which reaches an elevation of 3,482 metres (11,424 ft). Over 80% of Lesotho lies above 1,800 metres (5,906 ft).

Even though very little of Lesotho is covered in water, the rivers that run across the country are an important part of Lesotho's economy. Much of the country's export income comes from water, and much of its power comes from hydroelectricity. The Orange River rises in the Drakensberg mountains in northeastern Lesotho and flows across the entire length of the country before exiting to South Africa at the Mohale's Hoek District in the southwest. The Caledon River marks the northwestern part of the border with South Africa. Other rivers include the Malibamatso, Matsoku and Senqunyane.

The bedrock of Lesotho belongs to the Karoo Supergroup, consisting mostly of shale and sandstone. Peatlands can be found in the highlands of Lesotho, most extensively in the mountainous escarpment near the country's eastern border. The summit of Thabana Ntlenyana is partially encircled by bogs.

Solifluction deposits, blockfields, blockstreams and stone garlands can be found across the higher portions of the Lesotho Highlands. These features were formed in connection to the periglacial conditions that prevailed during the last glacial period in the area.

== Political geography ==
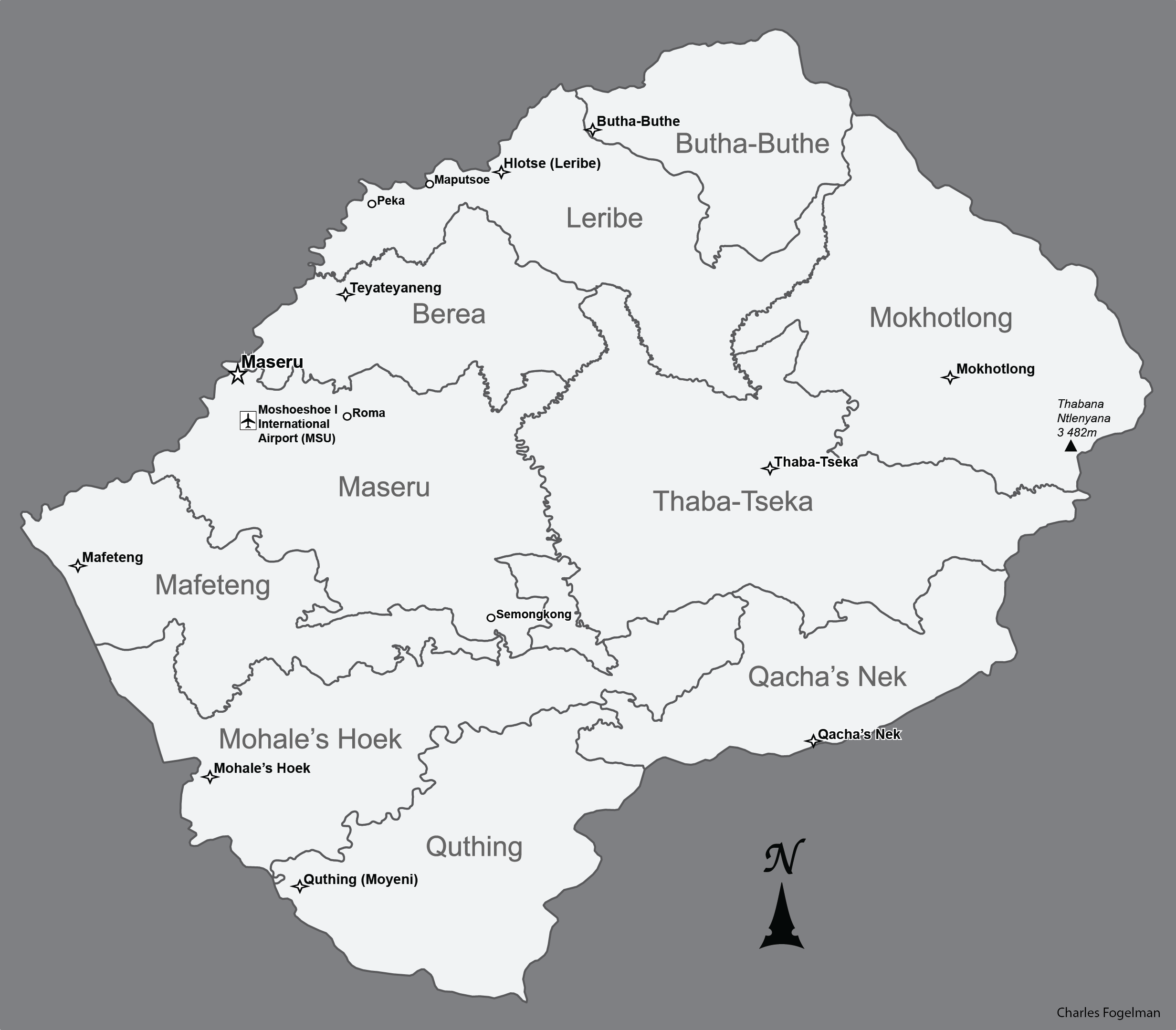
Districts and Cities of Lesotho

Lesotho is divided into 10 administrative districts, each with its own capital, called a camptown. The districts are further subdivided into 80 constituencies, which consist of 129 local community councils. The distribution of population in Lesotho overlaps with the country's varied ecological conditions; poverty too is linked to ecological conditions.

Districts (in alphabetical order):

- Berea
- Butha-Buthe
- Leribe
- Mafeteng
- Maseru
- Mohale's Hoek
- Mokhotlong
- Qacha's Nek
- Quthing
- Thaba-Tseka

== Climate ==
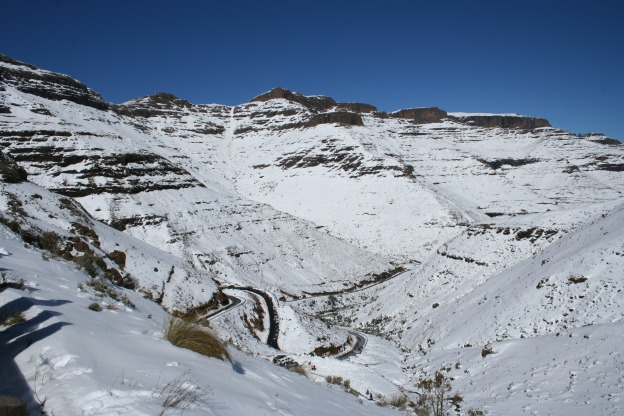
Snow on the Lesotho Moteng pass

Because of its altitude, the country remains cooler throughout the year than most other regions at the same latitude. Lesotho has a temperate climate, with hot summers and cold winters. Maseru and its surrounding lowlands often reach 30 °C (86 °F) in the summer. Winters can be cold with the lowlands getting down to −7 °C (19.4 °F) and the highlands to −20 °C (−4.0 °F) at times.

The yearly precipitation varies from around 600 millimetres (23.6 in) in the lowland valleys to around 1,200 millimetres (47.2 in) in areas of the northern and eastern escarpment bordering South Africa. Most of the rain falls as summer thunderstorms: 85% of the annual precipitation falls between the months of October and April. The winters—between May and September are usually very dry. Snow is common in the deserts and low valleys between May and September; the higher peaks can experience occasional significant snowfall year-round. Annual variance in rainfall is quite erratic, which leads to periodic droughts in the dry season (May to September) and flooding, which can be severe in the rainy season (October–April).

Climate data for Mejametala Airport (1991–2020)
Month	Jan	Feb	Mar	Apr	May	Jun	Jul	Aug	Sep	Oct	Nov	Dec	Year
Mean daily maximum °C (°F)	28.3 (82.9)	27.2 (81.0)	25.4 (77.7)	22.1 (71.8)	19.3 (66.7)	16.6 (61.9)	16.8 (62.2)	19.9 (67.8)	24.0 (75.2)	25.5 (77.9)	26.5 (79.7)	27.8 (82.0)	23.3 (73.9)
Daily mean °C (°F)	21.4 (70.5)	20.6 (69.1)	18.8 (65.8)	14.8 (58.6)	11.2 (52.2)	8.1 (46.6)	7.9 (46.2)	11.2 (52.2)	15.5 (59.9)	17.6 (63.7)	19.1 (66.4)	20.6 (69.1)	15.6 (60.0)
Mean daily minimum °C (°F)	14.7 (58.5)	14.1 (57.4)	12.1 (53.8)	7.6 (45.7)	3.2 (37.8)	−0.4 (31.3)	−1.0 (30.2)	2.4 (36.3)	6.9 (44.4)	9.8 (49.6)	11.8 (53.2)	13.5 (56.3)	7.9 (46.2)
Average rainfall mm (inches)	147 (5.8)	121 (4.8)	98 (3.9)	56 (2.2)	28 (1.1)	19 (0.7)	12 (0.5)	17 (0.7)	27 (1.1)	61 (2.4)	94 (3.7)	106 (4.2)	786 (31.1)
Average rainy days (≥ 1 mm)	11.2	9.8	8.7	5.4	3.1	2.1	1.6	2.2	3.4	7.1	9.0	9.9	73.5
Source: World Meteorological Organization

Climate data for Letšeng-la-Terae (normals 1991-2020)
Month	Jan	Feb	Mar	Apr	May	Jun	Jul	Aug	Sep	Oct	Nov	Dec	Year
Mean daily maximum °C (°F)	16.0 (60.8)	15.6 (60.1)	14.4 (57.9)	11.5 (52.7)	9.2 (48.6)	7.0 (44.6)	6.7 (44.1)	8.5 (47.3)	12.2 (54.0)	13.8 (56.8)	14.7 (58.5)	15.7 (60.3)	12.1 (53.8)
Daily mean °C (°F)	11.3 (52.3)	11.0 (51.8)	9.6 (49.3)	6.5 (43.7)	3.4 (38.1)	0.8 (33.4)	0.5 (32.9)	2.4 (36.3)	6.0 (42.8)	8.1 (46.6)	9.4 (48.9)	10.8 (51.4)	6.7 (44.0)
Mean daily minimum °C (°F)	7.1 (44.8)	6.8 (44.2)	5.2 (41.4)	1.9 (35.4)	−1.7 (28.9)	−4.2 (24.4)	−4.6 (23.7)	−3.1 (26.4)	-0.0 (32.0)	2.6 (36.7)	4.1 (39.4)	6.1 (43.0)	1.7 (35.0)
Average precipitation mm (inches)	299 (11.8)	217 (8.5)	155 (6.1)	74 (2.9)	33 (1.3)	20 (0.8)	18 (0.7)	47 (1.9)	51 (2.0)	145 (5.7)	163 (6.4)	218 (8.6)	1,440 (56.7)
Average precipitation days	17	14	13	8	4	2	2	4	6	12	13	16	111
Average relative humidity (%)	76	75	74	70	63	55	53	52	50	61	65	71	64
Mean monthly sunshine hours	251.1	221.2	235.6	228.0	248.0	246.0	266.6	275.9	285.0	282.1	279.0	272.8	3,091.3
Source: Climate-data.org (sun 1999-2019)

Climate data for Mohale's Hoek (1981–2010)
Month	Jan	Feb	Mar	Apr	May	Jun	Jul	Aug	Sep	Oct	Nov	Dec	Year
Mean daily maximum °C (°F)	28.3 (82.9)	27.7 (81.9)	25.6 (78.1)	22.1 (71.8)	18.9 (66.0)	15.8 (60.4)	16.2 (61.2)	18.8 (65.8)	22.6 (72.7)	24.2 (75.6)	26.1 (79.0)	27.6 (81.7)	22.8 (73.1)
Mean daily minimum °C (°F)	14.5 (58.1)	14.1 (57.4)	11.8 (53.2)	8.4 (47.1)	4.7 (40.5)	1.3 (34.3)	1.1 (34.0)	3.7 (38.7)	7.1 (44.8)	9.8 (49.6)	11.6 (52.9)	13.4 (56.1)	8.5 (47.2)
Average rainfall mm (inches)	110.0 (4.33)	94.9 (3.74)	96.4 (3.80)	57.2 (2.25)	20.6 (0.81)	16.8 (0.66)	8.9 (0.35)	26.4 (1.04)	31.1 (1.22)	68.5 (2.70)	80.3 (3.16)	98.4 (3.87)	709.5 (27.93)
Average rainy days (≥ 0.5 mm)	10	9	10	6	3	2	1	2	3	7	8	8	69
Source: World Meteorological Organization

Climate data for Qacha's Nek (1981–2010)
Month	Jan	Feb	Mar	Apr	May	Jun	Jul	Aug	Sep	Oct	Nov	Dec	Year
Mean daily maximum °C (°F)	25.0 (77.0)	24.3 (75.7)	22.5 (72.5)	20.2 (68.4)	17.5 (63.5)	14.5 (58.1)	14.7 (58.5)	17.1 (62.8)	20.5 (68.9)	21.3 (70.3)	22.8 (73.0)	24.6 (76.3)	20.4 (68.7)
Mean daily minimum °C (°F)	12.7 (54.9)	12.5 (54.5)	10.8 (51.4)	8.1 (46.6)	5.2 (41.4)	2.6 (36.7)	2.3 (36.1)	4.3 (39.7)	7.0 (44.6)	8.5 (47.3)	10.1 (50.2)	11.7 (53.1)	8.0 (46.4)
Average rainfall mm (inches)	150.3 (5.92)	121.0 (4.76)	83.4 (3.28)	39.8 (1.57)	10.9 (0.43)	15.7 (0.62)	12.0 (0.47)	23.5 (0.93)	33.1 (1.30)	71.2 (2.80)	86.7 (3.41)	118.0 (4.65)	765.6 (30.14)
Average rainy days (≥ 0.5 mm)	15	11	10	6	3	2	2	3	4	10	11	12	89
Source: World Meteorological Organization

Climate data for Quthing (1981–2010)
Month	Jan	Feb	Mar	Apr	May	Jun	Jul	Aug	Sep	Oct	Nov	Dec	Year
Mean daily maximum °C (°F)	27.3 (81.1)	26.8 (80.2)	24.7 (76.5)	21.5 (70.7)	17.7 (63.9)	14.9 (58.8)	15.2 (59.4)	17.9 (64.2)	21.9 (71.4)	23.7 (74.7)	25.2 (77.4)	26.8 (80.2)	22.0 (71.5)
Mean daily minimum °C (°F)	15.2 (59.4)	14.9 (58.8)	13.0 (55.4)	9.8 (49.6)	6.1 (43.0)	3.0 (37.4)	2.6 (36.7)	5.0 (41.0)	8.6 (47.5)	10.9 (51.6)	12.4 (54.3)	13.9 (57.0)	9.6 (49.3)
Average rainfall mm (inches)	118.8 (4.68)	95.0 (3.74)	101.3 (3.99)	58.5 (2.30)	33.4 (1.31)	22.9 (0.90)	6.9 (0.27)	29.6 (1.17)	27.2 (1.07)	73.5 (2.89)	85.5 (3.37)	112.8 (4.44)	765.4 (30.13)
Average rainy days (≥ 0.5 mm)	13	11	11	7	4	3	2	3	4	9	10	11	88
Source: World Meteorological Organization

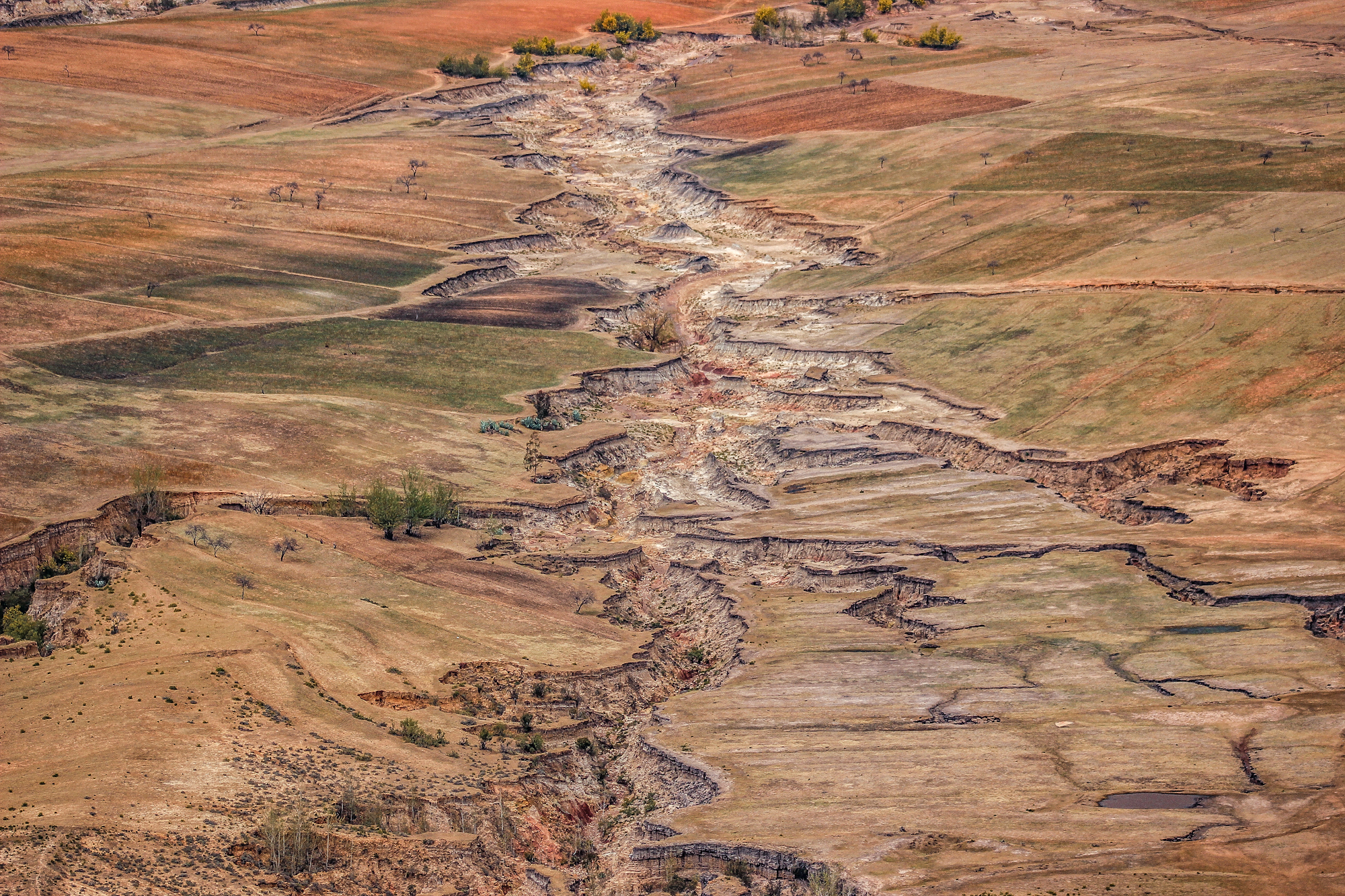

== Natural resources ==
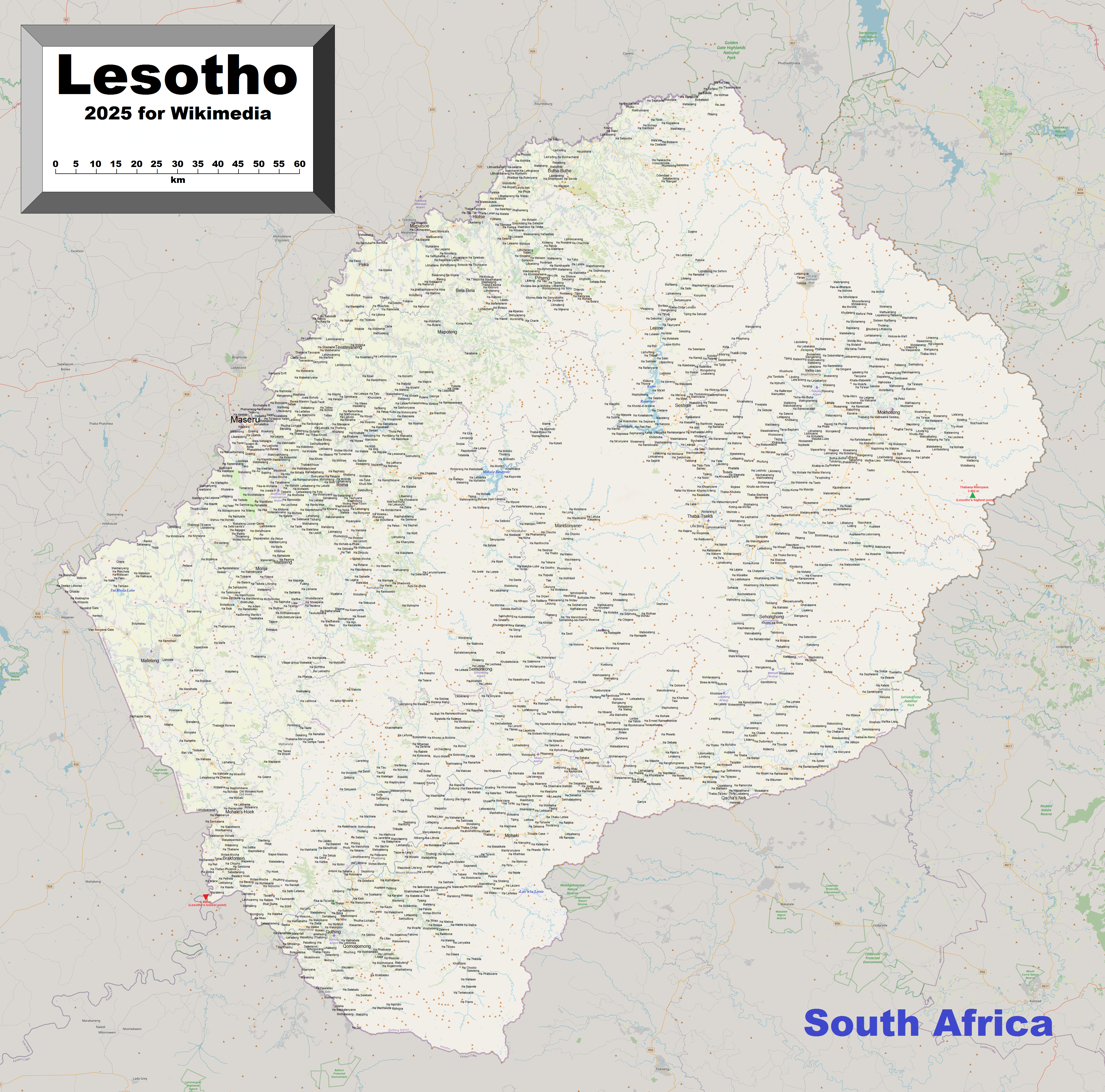
Detailed map of Lesotho

Lesotho is poor in natural resources. Economically the most important resource is water. The Lesotho Highlands Water Project allows exporting water from the Malibamatso, Matsoku, Senqu and Senqunyane rivers to South Africa, while also generating hydroelectric power for Lesotho's needs. As of April 2008, the first phase of the project has been completed. The project already accounts for an estimated five percent of Lesotho's GDP, and when fully completed, it could account for as much as 20 percent.

The main mineral resource is diamonds from the Letseng diamond mine in the Maluti mountain range. The mine produces very few stones, but has the highest dollar ratio per carat of any diamond mine in the world. Other mineral resources include coal, galena, quartz, agate and uranium deposits, but their exploitation is not considered commercially viable. Clay deposits can be found in the country, and are used for producing tiles, bricks and other ceramics.

Much of the population engages in subsistence farming, even though only 10.71% of the country's surface is classified as arable land and 0.13% has permanent crops. Much of the land has been ruined by soil erosion. The most fertile farmlands are in the northern and central lowlands, and in the foothills between the lowlands and the mountains. Large tracts of the fertile farmland to the north of the country—in the Free State region of South Africa—were lost to European colonists in wars during the 19th century.

== Extreme points ==
This is a list of the extreme points of Lesotho, the points that are farther north, south, east or west than any other location.

- Northernmost point - unnamed location on the border with Golden Gate Highlands National Park in South Africa immediately north-west of the village of Monontsa, In Butha-Buthe District
- Easternmost point - unnamed location on the border with South Africa immediately west of the South African mountain Giant's Castle, Mokhotlong District
- Southernmost point - Gairntoul mountain, Quthing District
- Westernmost point - unnamed location in the Caledon River on the border with South Africa, Mafeteng District
