= Ha Lejone =

Coordinates: 29°06′15″S 28°30′00″E

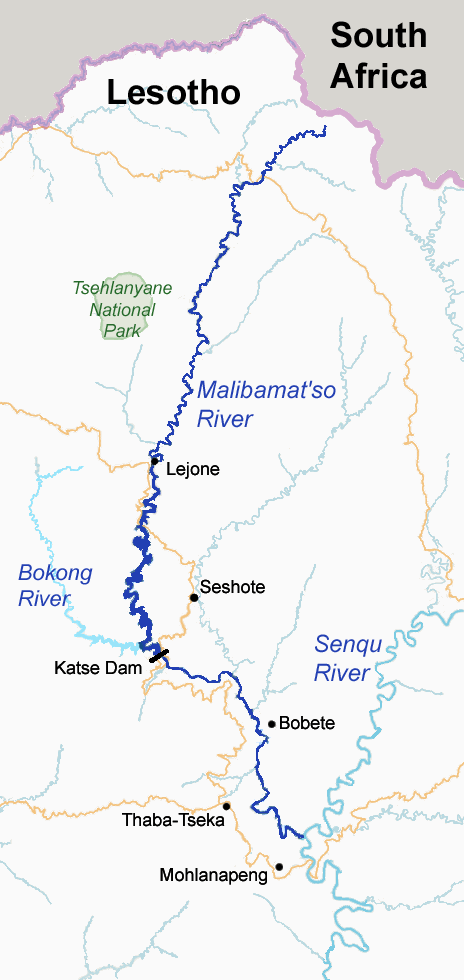
Course of the Malibamat'so River in northern Lesotho. Map data from OpenStreetMap.

Ha Lejone is a village in the Leribe District of northern Lesotho. It is on a ridge above a bend of the Malibamatšo River, 15 kilometres (9.3 mi) east of the Mafika-Lisiu Pass, which links Ha Lejone with the community of Pitseng.

It is also the northern extent of the high water backed up by the Katse Dam, 25 kilometres (16 mi) to the south. There is a bridge across the river just south of the village.
