= Bethlehem Hydro =

South African hydro-electric plant

Coordinates: 28°12′59″S 28°21′49″E

Bethlehem Hydro owns and operates two small hydro power plants situated in the Dihlabeng Local Municipality (Thabo Mofutsanyana District Municipality) in the Free State province of South Africa. The scheme utilizes the water supplied to South Africa by the Lesotho Highlands Water Project, which releases water into the As River via a tunnel outlet near the town of Clarens. South Africa has limited potential for hydro energy due to low average annual rainfall making projects like Bethlehem Hydro rare. The project was identified in 1999 and developed by NuPlanet Project Development. The two power stations in the scheme will cut back carbon dioxide emissions by 33,000 tons per year by reducing the demand for traditional fossil-fuel power stations.

== Sol Plaatje Power Station ==
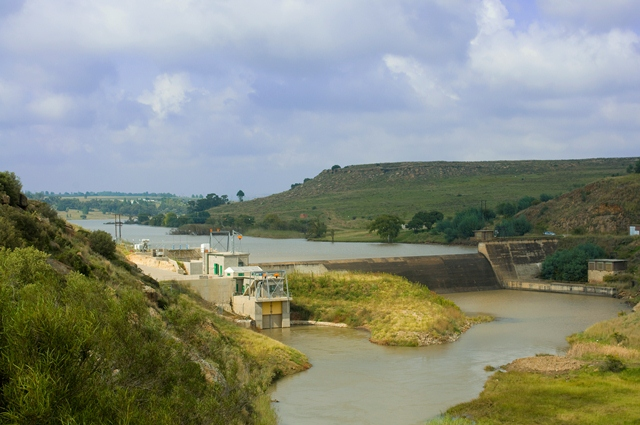
Sol Plaatje Power Station is located next to an older dam wall

The Sol Plaatje Power Station was the first commercial small hydro power station constructed in South Africa for 22 years. It was commissioned in November 2009 and is located close to Bethlehem, Free State. The power station was constructed next to the existing dam wall of the Sol Plaatje dam. The power station has an installed capacity of 3 MW and has a double regulated horizontal axis Kaplan turbine.

== Merino Power Station ==
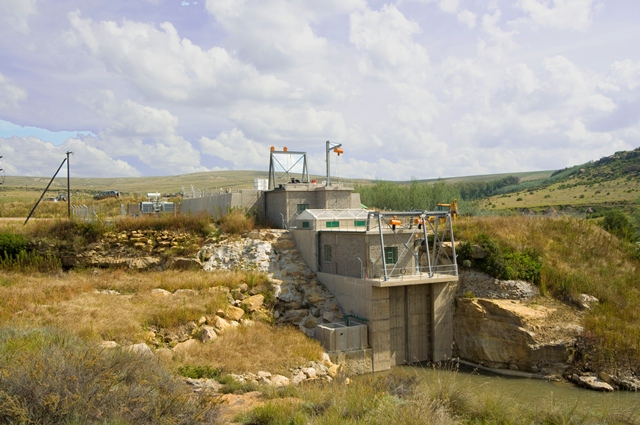
Merino Power Station is a run-off-river plant with a canal

The Merino Power is a run-of-river type hydro power station situated 10 km downstream from the tunnel outlet of the Lesotho Highlands Water Project. The power station consists of an intake weir, a 600 m canal and a power house with a double regulated horizontal Kaplan turbine. The power station has an installed capacity of 4 MW.
