= Mohale Dam =

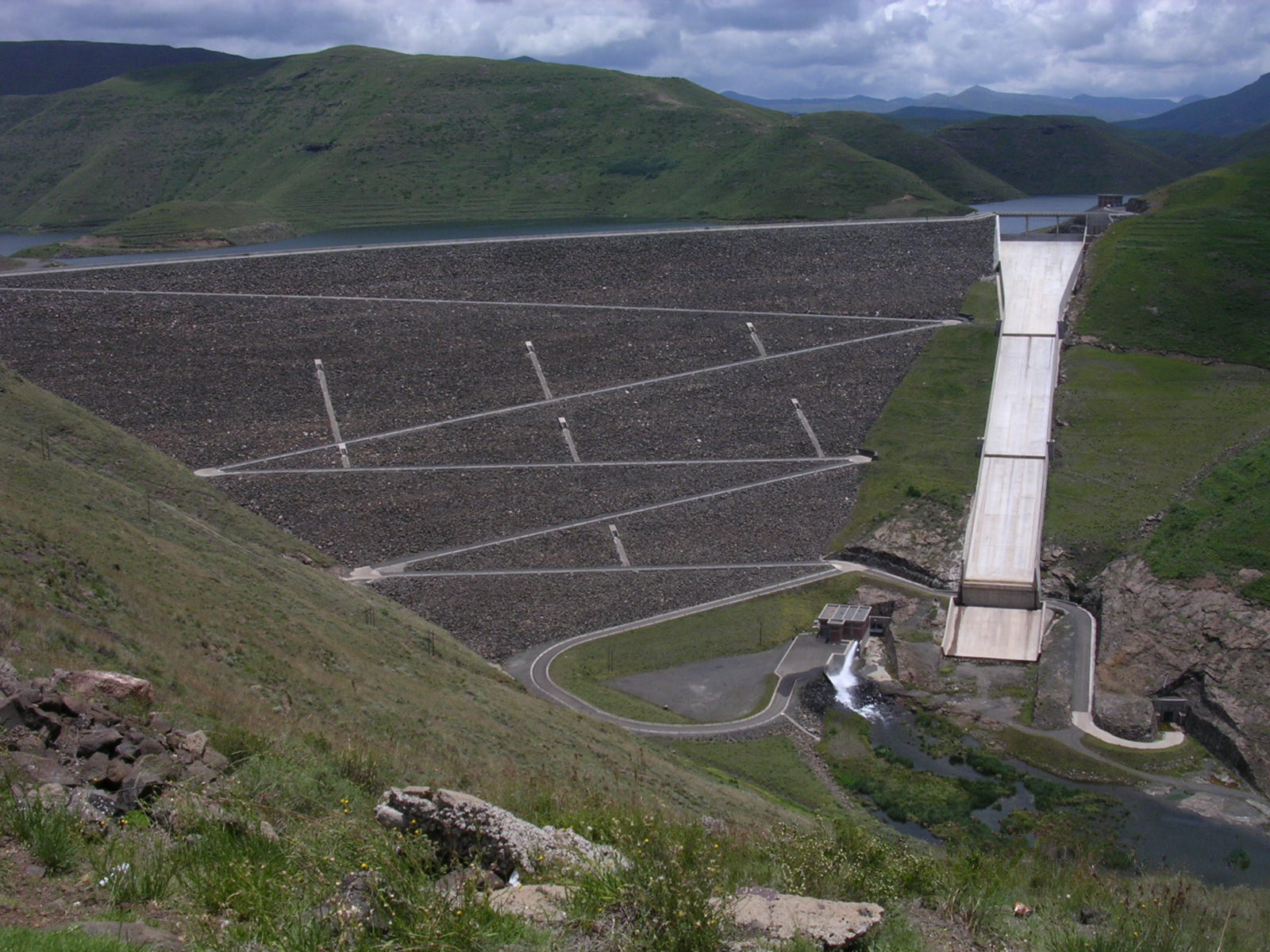
- Mohale Dam
- Official name: Mohale Dam
- Location: Lesotho
- Coordinates: 29°27′24.20″S 28°05′45.18″E
- Opening date: 2003-04

Dam and spillways
- Type of dam: Embankment, concrete faced rock-fill
- Impounds: Senqunyane River
- Height: 145 metres (476 ft)
- Length: 700 metres (2,300 ft)
- Dam volume: 7,500,000 m^{3} (9,809,630 cu yd)
- Spillway capacity: 6,000 m^{3}/s (211,888 cu ft/s)

Reservoir
- Total capacity: 1.0 km^{3} (810,713 acre⋅ft)

Mohale Dam is a concrete faced rock-fill dam in Lesotho. It is the second dam, under Phase 1B of the series of dams of the proposed Lesotho Highlands Water Project (LHWP), which will eventually include five large dams in remote rural areas of Lesotho and South Africa. The project has been built at a cost of US$1.5 billion.

The Mohale Dam was awarded the 2005 Fulton Awards by the Concrete Society of South Africa as having the "Best Construction Engineering Project and Best Construction Technique."

== Geography ==
The dam is built across the Senqunyane River below its confluence with the western tributary, the Likalaneng River. Investigation of the dam site in the "Highlands of Lesotho" has revealed "rounded, steep sided valleys" where the soil cover is thin and basaltic lava is the dominant formation. The dam site has been identified with two geological features of faults which needed treatment measures. The dam is located 100 kilometres (62 mi) to the east of Maseru, which is the capital of Lesotho. The dam drains a catchment area of 938 square kilometres (362 sq mi) over a river length of 60 kilometres (37 mi) with an elevation variation of 1,050 metres (3,440 ft).

== Background ==
The importance of the large water resources potential of the country, one of the various natural resources of the land-locked country. Subsequently, Director of Public Works, requested an engineer to examine the potential of the project as a possible means to supplement the water supply needs in South African gold mines.

In 1983, the World Bank began implementing the project. Phase I covered some of the key strategic components of the project, while Phase IB's financing covered not only engineering design and supervision of the main works but an institutionalized framework with a panel of experts in the field of engineering and the environmental and social aspects of the project. The Development Bank of Southern Africa (DBSA), the European Investment Bank (IIB), and Export Credit agencies were also approached to finance the project.

The Lesotho Highlands Water Project (LHWP) was established, with the objective of supplying water to the Gauteng region of South Africa and for hydroelectric power to meet the needs of Lesotho. A treaty signed between the government of Lesotho and South Africa gave the green light for the project, and the team was set up to implement the project. The treaty is limited to Phases IA and IB only. The Trans-Caledon Tunnel Authority (TCTA), vested with the operation and maintenance aspects of the project is guided by the larger establishment of the Lesotho Highlands Development Authority (LHDA). The project envisages diverting water in the highlands of the country through three dams; two under Phase I (PhaseI A -Katse Dam and Phase II - Mohale Dam) and the Polihali Dam under Phase II. Construction of the Phase I dams were completed in 2003 and formally commissioned in 2004.

== Features ==
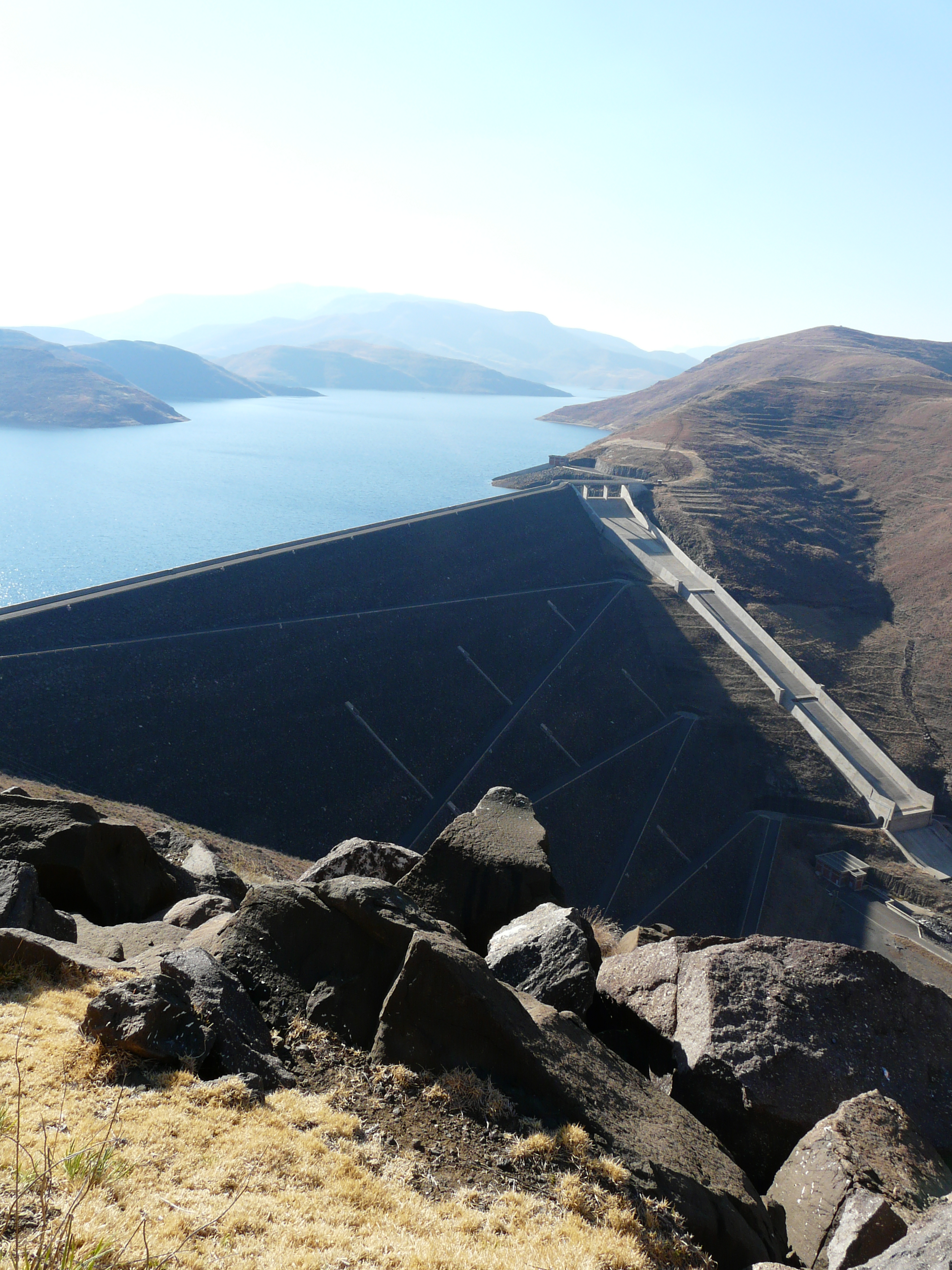
The Mohale Dam

The Mohale Dam under Phase I B of the LHWP, is designed to divert about 70 cubic metres (2,500 cu ft) per second of storage to the Katse Dam reservoir. The water supply meets the needs of the Gauteng region which encompasses the mining and industrial cities of Johannesburg and Pretoria. The regulated flow from the reservoir is 9.5 cubic metres (340 cu ft) per second which is transferred as gravity flow through the interconnecting concrete lined tunnel of 32 kilometres (20 mi) length with an internal diameter of 3.4 metres (11 ft).

Mohale Dam is categorized as a high dam, and at 145 metres (476 ft) in height it is said to be the highest rock-fill concrete-face dam (CFRD) in Africa. It is built as an embankment dam with a rock-fill concrete-face on the upstream side. The volumetric content of the dam structure is 7.5 million m³. The dam has a length of 700 metres (2,300 ft) with a 12 metres (39 ft) wide crest. The spillway, located on the left bank of the dam, is not gated and flood is routed over the crest of the ogee shaped spillway through a concrete lined chute with a flip bucket and a stilling basin at its terminus. The concrete spillway is designed for a flood discharge of 6,000 cubic metres (210,000 cu ft) per second.

=== Safety measures ===
The geological features at the dam site were evaluated for possibilities of displacement. The treatment measures implemented to address this condition involved excavation of a trench of 15 metres (49 ft) width and 2 metres (6 ft 7 in) depth below the toe slab which is meant to function as a concrete "socle". A grout curtain was also created through the "lineament" (fault line) and a grouting gallery was provided for the purpose that covered the downstream part of the embankment up to the toe-slab area near the lineament. Both the "socle" and the toe-slab incorporate movement joints consisting of 20 millimetres (0.79 in) compressible materials and a PVC water stop. A layer of earth fill is also laid on the upstream part of the toe slab over a width of 70 metres (230 ft), and on the downstream side protection includes a geo-textile and "reverse filters of 2D and 2E material".

=== Temporary cofferdams and river diversions ===
A temporary 300 000m3 cofferdam, with a pre-cofferdam, were built in mid-1999.

River diversion was effected through two concrete lined diversion tunnels constructed on the left bank. The diversion tunnels are 650 metres (2,130 ft) and 560 metres (1,840 ft) long, and have a cross-section of 6.70 by 5.50 metres (22.0 ft × 18.0 ft). The intake for water transfer is located 5 kilometres (3.1 mi) upstream of the dam face on the left bank.

=== Aggregate ===
Approximately 13 000m3 of rock was placed every day. Two quarries were used; one to supply the bulk of the rock for the rock-fill and the other for the higher quality doleritic basalt used in the concrete aggregate and filter layers in the dam.

=== Concrete ===
The total quantity of concrete contained in the dam is 30,000 cubic metres (1,100,000 cu ft). The concrete facing on the upstream face of the dam was constructed concurrently at two levels. The lower part of the concrete slab was laid up to two thirds height of the dam from the bottom while the top one third face was also concurrently laid. This special construction method facilitated early completion of the dam. The dam is said to be one of the top ten concrete faced embankment dams in the world.

== Submergence ==
The project's reservoir submergence involved some of the most fertile agricultural land in the area. The project affected 390 households and some 1700 people.

== Bibliography ==
- Bennett, Olivia; McDowell, Christopher (10 April 2012). Displaced: The Human Cost of Development and Resettlement. Palgrave Macmillan. ISBN 978-1-137-07423-2.
- Consortium, Lahmeyer McDonald; Consortium, Olivier Shand (1986). Lesotho Highlands Water Project: H14-19. Kingdom of Lesotho, Ministry of Water, Energy and Mining.
- Dennill, Bruce (2001). Lesotho Highlands Water Project: partners for life. LHDA.
- Fell, Robin; MacGregor, Patrick; Stapledon, David; Bell, Graeme (20 May 2005). Geotechnical Engineering of Dams. CRC Press. ISBN 978-0-415-88932-2.
- Haas, Lawrence J. M.; Mazzei, Leonardo; O'Leary, Donal (2010). Lesotho Highlands Water Project: Communication Practices for Governance and Sustainability Improvement. World Bank Publications. ISBN 978-0-8213-8435-0.
- McDonald, David A. (1 April 2004). Environmental Justice in South Africa. Juta and Company Ltd. ISBN 978-1-919713-66-3.
