= Senqunyane River =

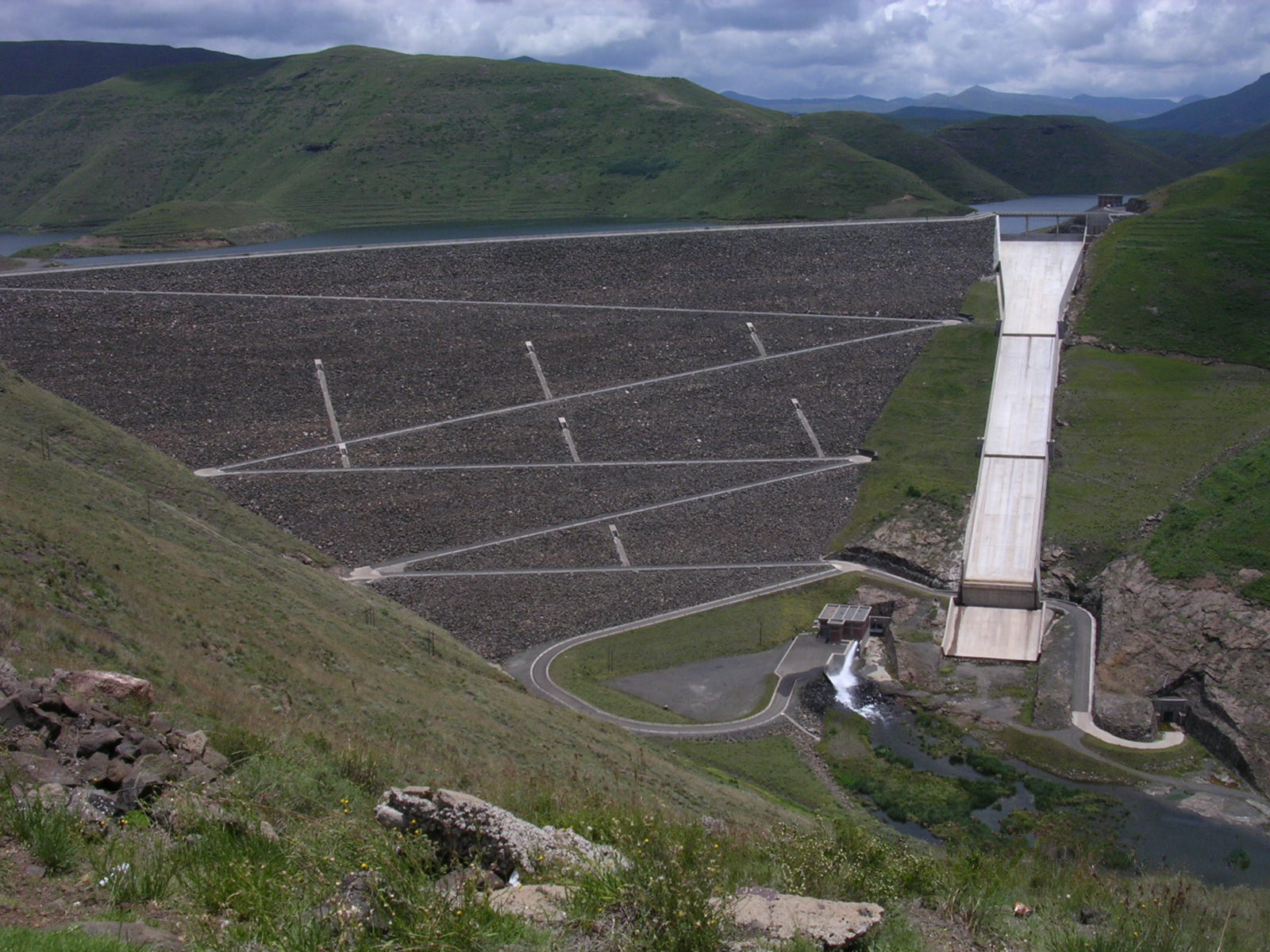
- The Mohale Dam impounding the Senqunyane River

- Location of the Senqunyane River's mouth Senqunyane River (South Africa)

Location
- Country: Lesotho

Physical characteristics
- Source: Maluti Mountains
  - elevation: 2,850 m (9,350 ft)
- Mouth: Senqu River (Orange River)
  - coordinates: 30°1′59″S 28°10′26″E
  - elevation: 1,515 m (4,970 ft)
- Length: 120 km (75 mi)

Basin features
- Tributaries
  - right: Bokong River, Jordane River, Likalaneng River

The Senqunyane River is a river of central Lesotho. The river rises in the Maluti Mountains in northwest of Lesotho, and flows southwards and then westwards for 120 kilometres before joining the Senqu River (Orange River) in the southwest.

The source of the Senqunyane is the meeting point of three districts: Thaba-Tseka District, Berea District and Leribe District. It forms the border between Thaba-Tseka District and first Berea and then Maseru District, as well as a small section of the Mafeteng District that is separated from the rest of its district and located high in the Maluti Mountains, for much of its length.

Tributaries include the Bokong River, as well as the Jordane River and Likalaneng River, which join the Senqunyane shortly before the Mohale Dam.

The Mohale Dam, opened in 2003, is part of the Lesotho Highlands Water Project, diverting water to the Katse Dam and hence to the Gauteng region in South Africa, including the cities of Johannesburg and Pretoria.

The river is home to the rare Rock-catfish ("Austroglanis sclateri"). The Semonkong Waterfall acts as a migration barrier separating distinct fish communities.

The Senqunyane Valley is the site of a number of archaeological and rock art sites. The valley was first inhabited in the Middle Stone Age.

The sandstone gorge with steep cliffs poses a problem to access. A notable bridge build in 2011 crosses the river near its confluence with the Orange River.

== See also ==
- Mohale Dam — on the Senqunyane River.
- Lesotho Highlands Water Project
