= Liebenbergsvlei River =

River in South Africa

Coordinates: 27°19′26″S 28°31′03″E

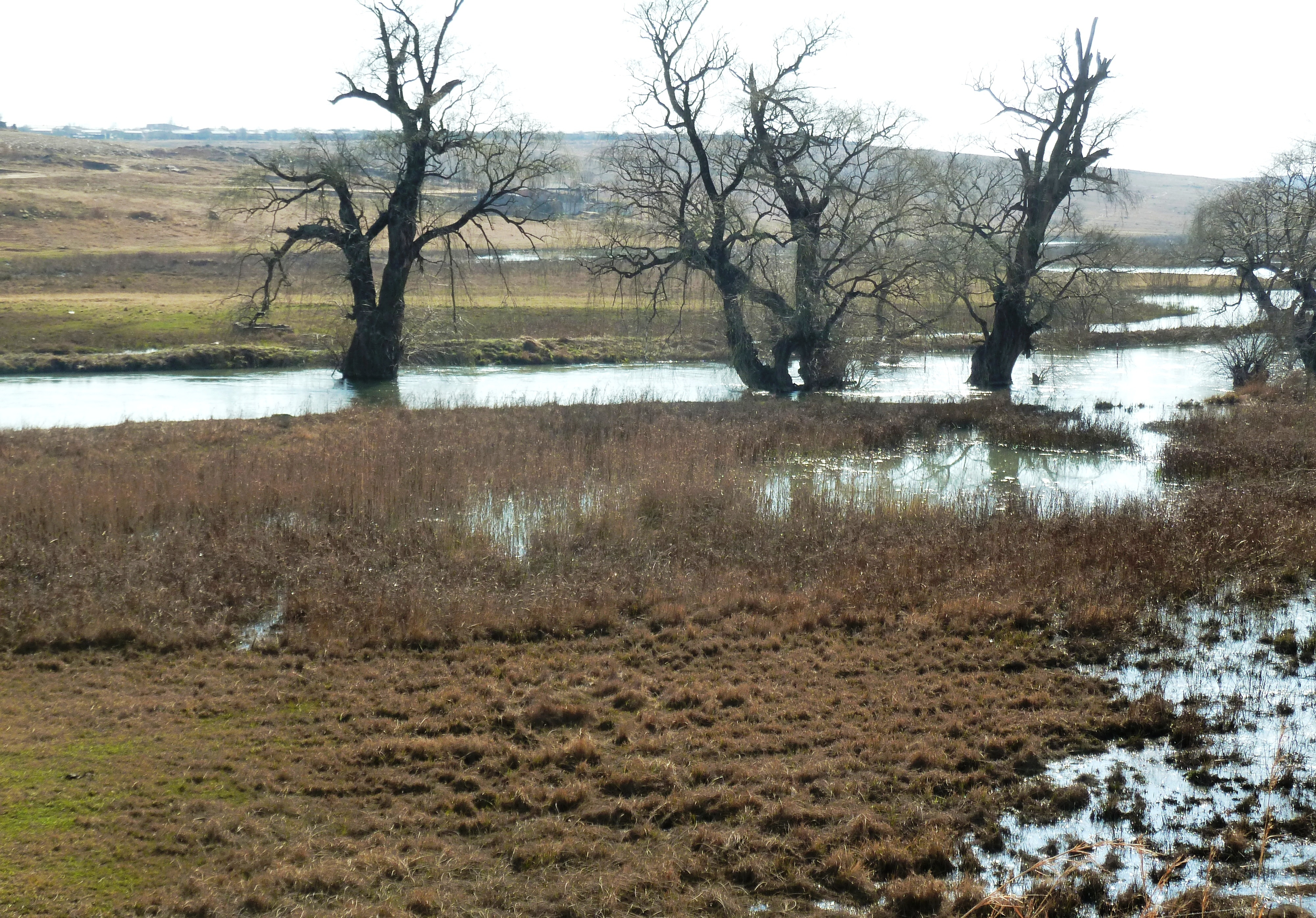
The Liebenbergsvlei outside Bethlehem, Free State

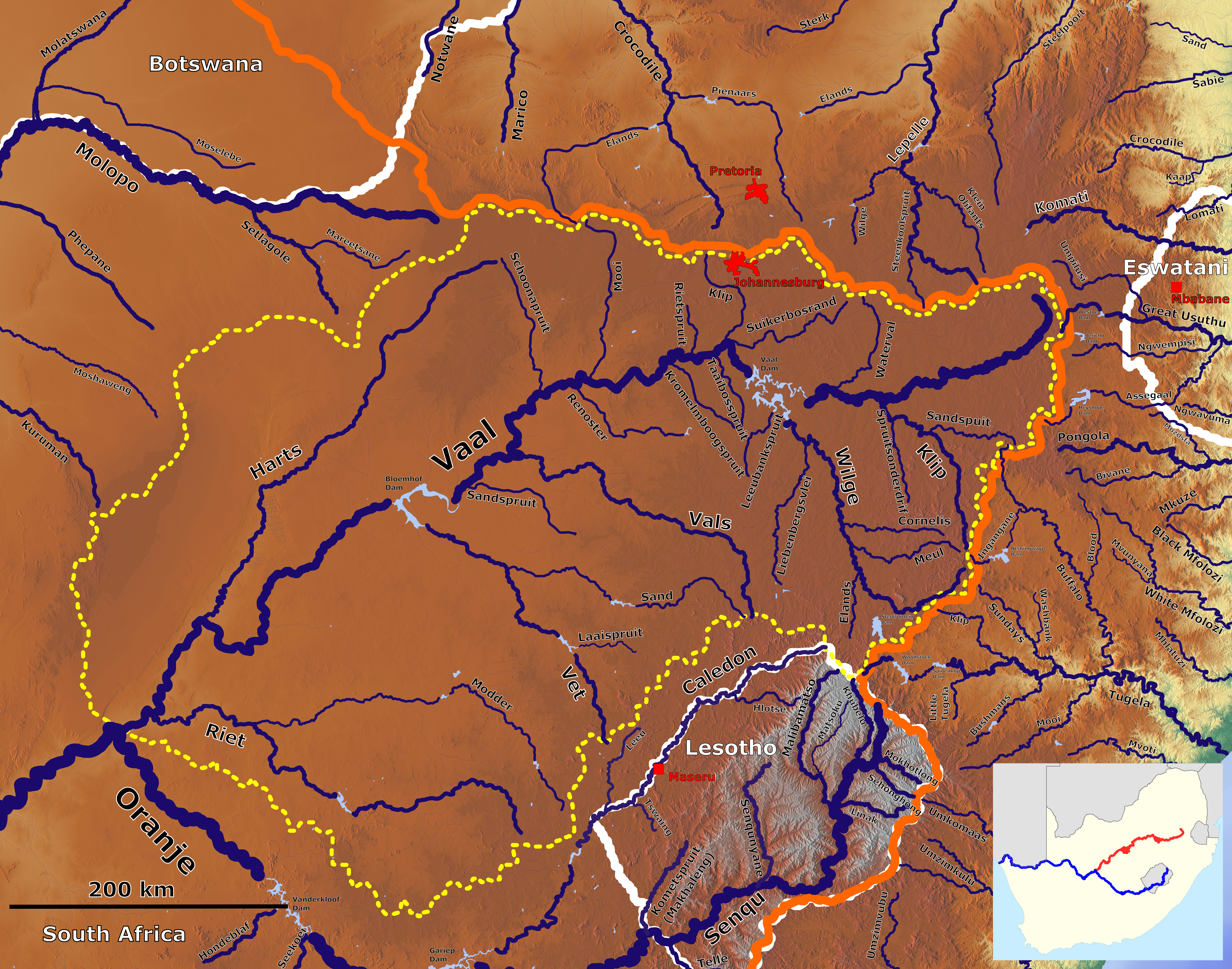
The river Liebenbergsvlei in the catchment area of the Vaal (right center)

The Liebenbergsvlei River is a tributary of the Wilge River, flowing in the Free State province of South Africa.

== Lesotho Highlands Water Project ==
The Liebenbergsvlei is a conduit for water delivered by the Lesotho Highlands Water Project. The water is discharged at the As River Outfall, situated 9 km north of Clarens, which was opened in 1998. The As delivers water to the Saulspoort Dam and the Liebenbergsvlei and Wilge Rivers downstream, where after the water enters the Vaal Dam. The Vaal Dam can also be augmented from the Tugela-Vaal Water Project, by releasing water from the Sterkfontein Dam via the Nuwejaarspruit and Wilge River.

== Canoe marathon ==
The annual Liebensbergvlei canoe marathon is an annual event consisting of two day stages. It starts near Reitz, and the first stage ends 33 km downstream at Zorgvliet farm, near Tweeling. The second day starts at Bruinswick farm north of Tweeling and ends at Frankfort.
