= Rhizotron =

rhizotron with pea plants

A Rhizotron (from rhizóō, "root" as a verb – see wikt:rhizo-) is a laboratory constructed underground in order to study the soil and its interactions with plants and animals. Rhizotrons are typically equipped with a central corridor with viewing windows into the soil profiles on either side. On the outside, separate bays are constructed to enable specific experiments to be carried out by varying the soil composition and the plant and animals contained therein.

Rhizotrons are in use at Kew Gardens, at the USDA Northern Research Station at Houghton, Michigan, at Treborth Botanic Garden, near Bangor, Gwynedd, U.K. and at Charles Sturt University, Wagga Wagga, Australia.
