= Sol Plaatje Dam =

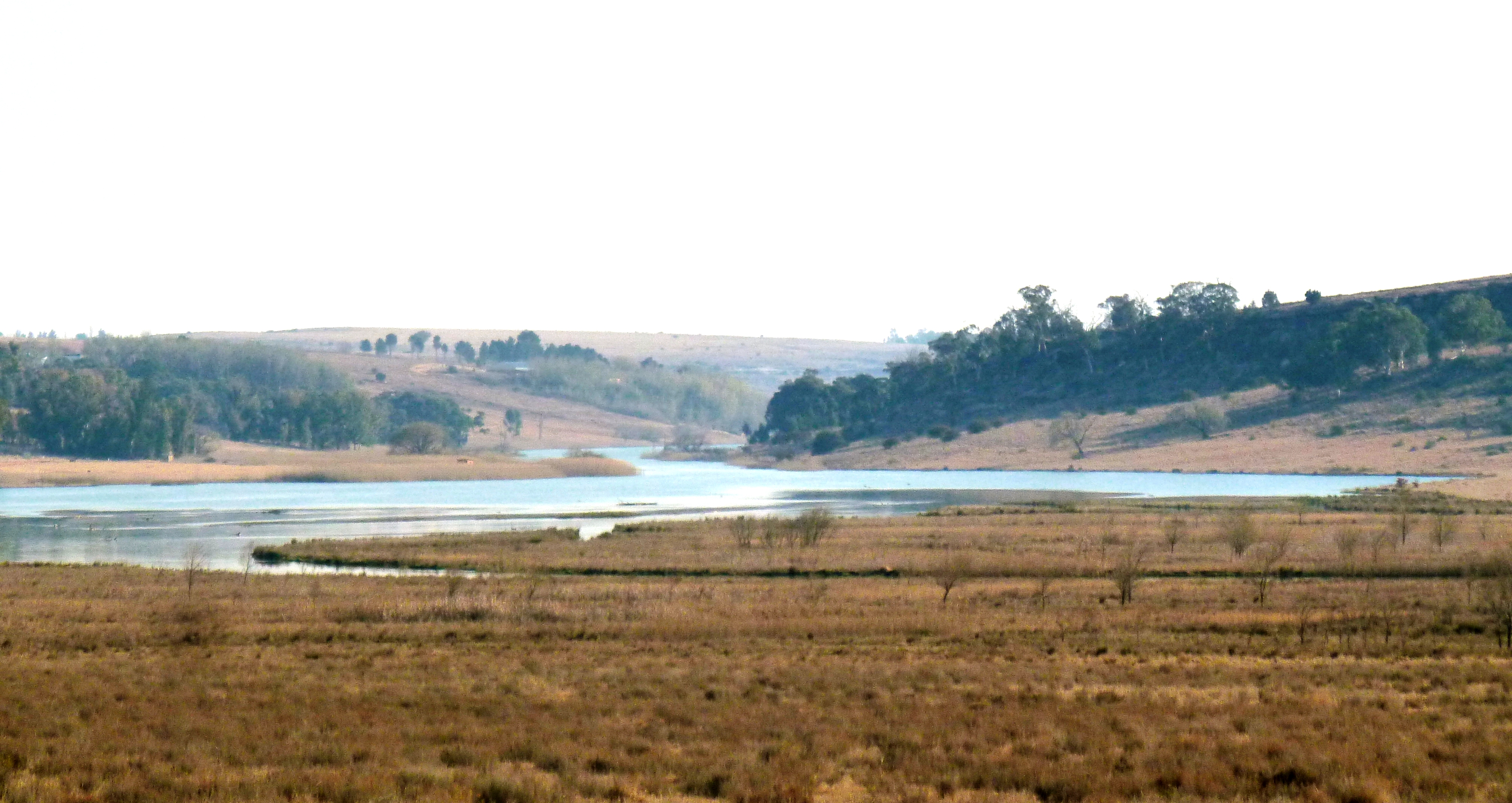
- The reservoir's western or As River inflow
- Interactive map of Sol Plaatje Dam
- Official name: Sol Plaatje Dam (previously: Saulspoort Dam)
- Location: Free State, South Africa
- Coordinates: 28°13′01″S 28°21′47″E
- Opening date: 1968
- Operators: Department of Water Affairs and Forestry

Dam and spillways
- Type of dam: earth-fill
- Impounds: As River, Liebenbergsvlei River
- Height: 19 metres (62 ft)
- Length: 70 metres (230 ft)

Reservoir
- Creates: Sol Plaatje Dam Reservoir
- Total capacity: 15,676,000 cubic metres (553,600,000 cu ft)
- Surface area: 356 hectares (880 acres)

Sol Plaatje Dam (formerly the Saulspoort Dam) is an earth-fill type dam located at the confluence of the As and Liebenbergsvlei Rivers near Bethlehem, Free State, South Africa. It was established in 1968 and serves mainly for municipal and domestic water supply. The hazard potential of the dam has been ranked high. The reservoir receives water from the Lesotho Highlands Water Project via the As River.

Originally known as Saulspoort Dam, it was officially renamed on 1 April 2005, recalling the bus disaster which took place there in the early hours of 1 May 2003, when 51 passengers, en route to a Workers Day rally, were drowned. 41 of the workers were employees of the Sol Plaatje Municipality (Kimberley).

== See also ==
- List of reservoirs and dams in South Africa
- List of rivers of South Africa

== External lists ==
- List of South African Dams from the Department of Water Affairs and Forestry (South Africa)
