= Treborth Botanic Garden =

Botanical garden in Wales

Coordinates: 53.2165°N 4.1724°W

Treborth Botanic Garden (Welsh: Gardd Fotaneg Treborth), is a botanic garden in Wales, close to the city of Bangor, Gwynedd. It is owned by Bangor University, and is used in teaching for University students, local schools and community groups. It is open to the public without charge.

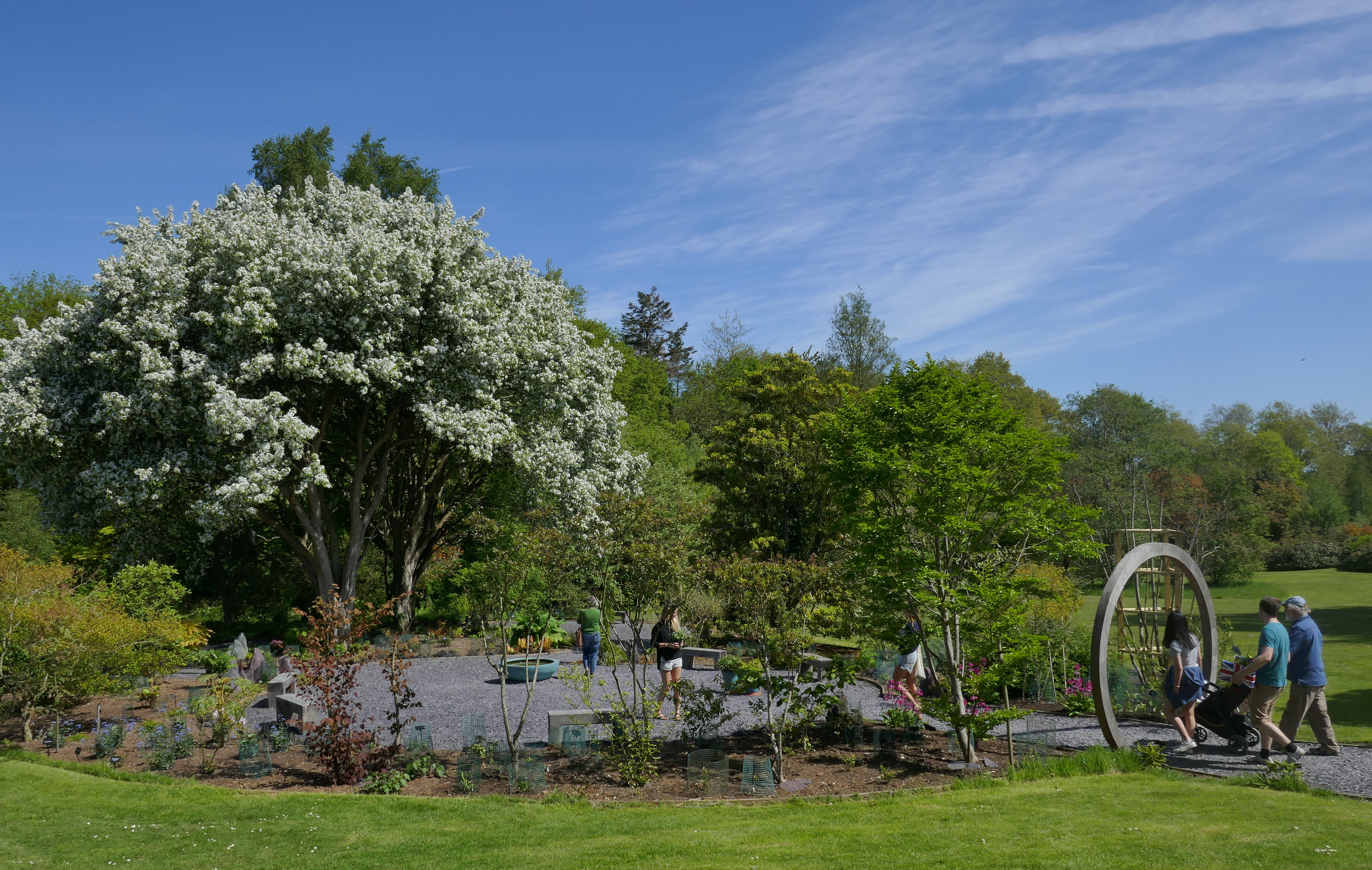
The Chinese garden in 2018 with Malus hupehensis in full bloom

It contains beds of plants, glass-houses, a large area of native established broad-leaved woodland and is bounded to the north by the seashore of the Menai Strait.

== History of the Garden ==
The current site was originally developed as a Victorian tourist destination, Britannia Park, by the Chester and Holyhead Railway Company in the 1840s. The grounds were designed by Sir Joseph Paxton, and features of his design can be seen today, such as the lime avenue. However, due to a funding crisis the site was abandoned and reverted to pasture and woodland. Funding crises were to become a feature of the site's subsequent history.

In 1960, the then University College of North Wales (now Bangor University) bought the land with the aim of developing it into a collection of plants for the University's Department of Botany. When the Department of Botany closed, the Garden continued to be used by other departments within the University for teaching, in particular for environmental courses.

In recent years, Treborth Botanic Garden has come under threat of closure by Bangor University due to high maintenance costs, but this threat has been largely countered by the Friends of Treborth Botanic Garden, a volunteer group with charitable status that helps in the day-to-day running of the Garden, and the Students for Treborth Action Group (STAG), a Bangor University Students' Union society formed to safeguard the Garden for use by the students and population of Bangor.

Treborth Botanic Garden is twinned with Katse Botanical Gardens in Lesotho and has a special relationship with Xishuangbanna Tropical Botanical Garden in China.

== Facilities and collections ==
=== Indoor ===
Treborth Botanic Garden has six glasshouses and a teaching laboratory with associated offices for the use of the curator and the volunteers in the main building complex. The Temperate Glasshouse features cacti, succulents, South African native plants and Canary Island native plants. The Tropical Glasshouse houses a variety of plants from the tropics including banana cultivars. The Orchid House and Bubble House contain the collections of orchids and carnivorous plants. Other glasshouses are used to house tender species from temperate zones, Welsh native flora, and for propagation and storage. The teaching lab doubles as a welcome area for visitors. A car park is situated outside the main building complex.

=== Outdoor ===
Away from the main buildings, Treborth features the largest rhizotron in Europe, a pigeon loft and meteorological recording equipment in a research compound . The garden has extensive outdoor grounds which extend all the way down to the shore of the Menai Strait. The grounds feature a half-acidic, half-basic rock garden, orchard and wildflower meadows alongside traditional outdoor planting. The majority of the grounds are woodlands designated as a Site of Special Scientific Interest.

As part of special 50th Anniversary celebrations, which started with the annual musical fundraising festival Botanical Beats, a new wildlife pond was created and opened in June 2010.

=== Two Dragons Chinese medicinal garden ===
The two dragons Chinese medicinal garden was inaugurated in 2014 and was formally opened in November 2016. It was funded by the Confucius Institute in collaboration with Xishuangbanna Tropical Botanical Garden of the Chinese Academy of Sciences. The garden contains many plants that are medicinally significant in China and is approached through a specially constructed wooden Moon gate

=== The Size of Wales garden ===
At the Chelsea Flower Show in 2024, the Size of Wales garden highlighted the bio-diversity of tropical forests. After the show ended, the garden was relocated to Treborth.

=== Moss trail and fern collection ===
The garden is located within degraded temperate rainforest, habitat noted for bryophytes and ferns. In 2023 a Moss Trail was installed as part of celebrations of the centenary of the British Bryological Society. This features 10 species of moss or liverwort around the garden. The garden also holds the national plant collection of Welsh native ferns.

== See also ==
- List of gardens in Wales
