= Malibamatšo River =

River in northern Lesotho

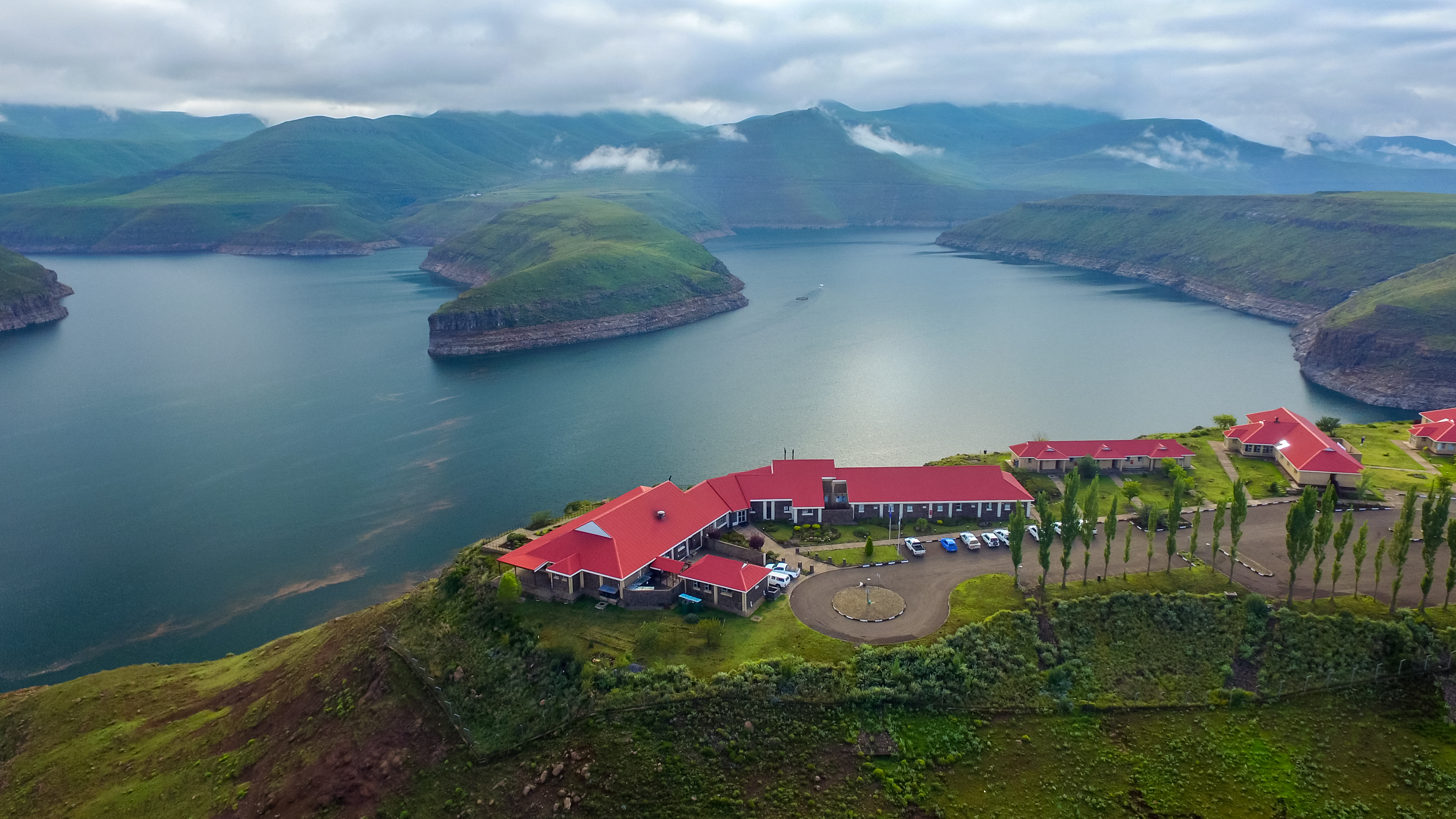
Malibamatšo River in Lesotho.

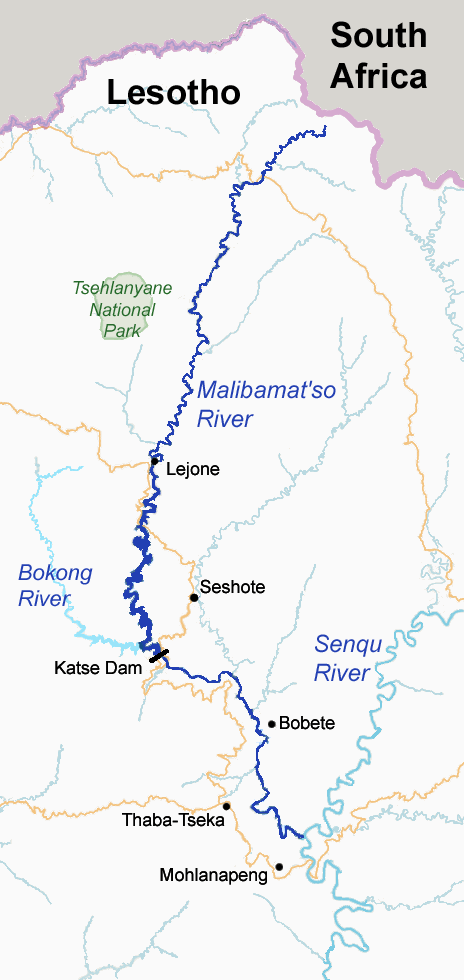
Course of the Malibamatšo River in northern Lesotho. Map data from OpenStreetMap.

The Malibamatšo River is a river in northern Lesotho. Its origin is near the South African border, where it drains the eastern slopes of the Maloti Range. It flows southwards past the village of Lejone, and eventually joins the Senqu River 5 kilometres (3.1 mi) northeast of Mohlanapeng.

The Malibamatšo forms the northern arm of the Katse Dam reservoir, a part of the Lesotho Highlands Water Project. Katse is Africa's highest elevation dam at 1,993 metres (6,539 ft) above sea level. Here the river is joined by the Bokong/Bokung River. Downstream the Malibamatšo's left bank tributaries are the Matsoku and Semenanyane Rivers, before it forms a right bank tributary of the Senqu/Orange River.

== Location ==
| Point | Coordinates (links to map & photo sources) | Notes |
|---|---|---|
| Source | 28.70299°S 28.73707°E | |
| Katse Dam | 29.33703°S 28.50665°E | |
| Senqu River confluence | 29.55315°S 28.70649°E | |
