= Lesotho Highlands =

Coordinates: 29°0′0″S 28°30′0″E

- Natural region
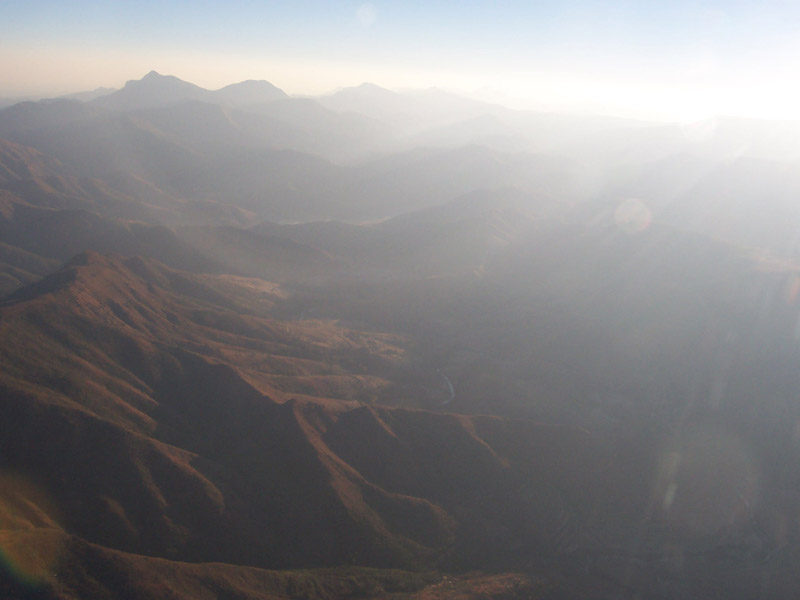
- The Lesotho Highlands from the air

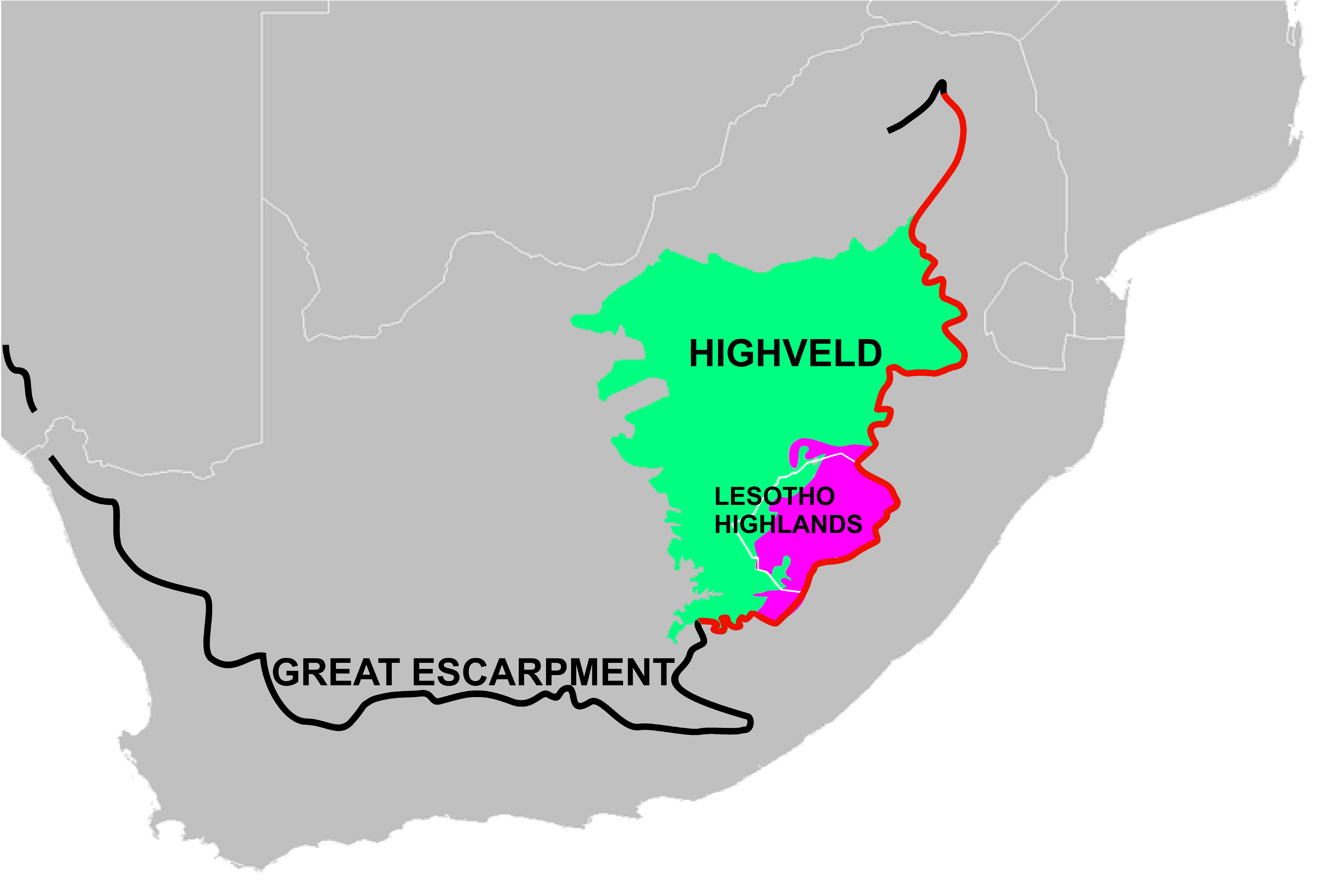
- The Lesotho Highlands in a map of Southern Africa.
- Country: Lesotho
- Elevation: 2,000 m (6,600 ft)

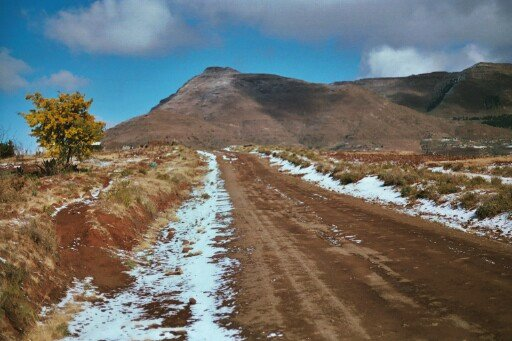
Snow near Malealea village in the Lesotho Highlands

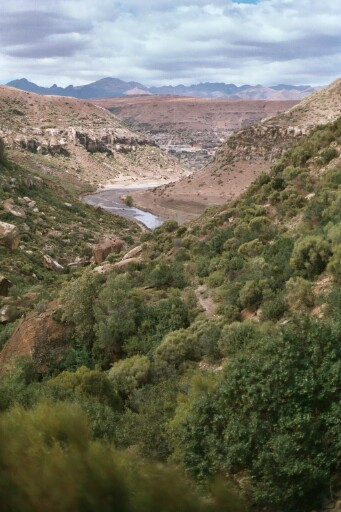
Makhaleng River Gorges in the highlands

The Lesotho Highlands are formed by the Drakensberg and Maloti mountain ranges in the east and central parts of the country of Lesotho. Foothills form a divide between the lowlands and the highlands. Snow is common in the highlands in the winter.

== Location and description ==
The Highlands are located to the southeast of the Highveld, encompassing the whole eastern part of Lesotho. The average annual rainfall is nearly 1,000 mm (40 inches) in some parts of the high ranges. Temperature is closely related to elevation in the Lesotho Highlands. In general, the mean July (winter) temperatures stay around 7 °C (45 °F).

The Lesotho Highlands form a localized high spot on the Central Plateau of the Great Escarpment. This is because it is capped by a 1400 m thick layer of erosion resistant lava which welled up and spread across most of Southern Africa when it was still part of Gondwana. Most of this lava has eroded away together with a layer of Karoo sedimentary rocks several kilometres thick on top of which the lava was poured out 182 million years ago. Only a small patch of this lava remains and covers much of Lesotho. The Lesotho Highlands have been deeply eroded by the tributaries of the Orange River which drain these highlands towards the south-west by means of erosion gulleys which turn into deep valleys further downstream. This gives this high region its very rugged, mountainous appearance. There are so many of these tributaries that the whole terrain of the highlands has a very rugged mountainous appearance, both from the ground and from the air.

The eastern Lesotho Highlands contain numerous terraces and scarp faces developed on ancient flood basalt. The form and development of terraces is controlled by rock structure. The terraces are pediments where cryogenic processes are active. The terraces may be referred as cryoplanation terraces albeit this term is controversial. Each scarp represent a flow unit of the flood basalt.

During the last glacial period periglacial conditions prevailed in the highlands producing landforms such as blockfields, blockstreams and stone garlands. During the coldest period of the last glacial period—the Last Glacial Maximum— the environment was relatively arid with deep seasonal freezing. The area is believed to have been free of both permafrost and large snow accumulations. There is some uncertainty if small glaciers ever developed in the shadowy slopes around the highlands.

== Flora ==
There are numerous species of plants in the highlands. The soil cover in the upland areas is discontinuous and immature. Soils in the Lesotho Highlands differ according to the host rock (basalt) and the influence of freeze and thaw processes; generally they are dominated by mollisols.

Some sectors of the Lesotho Highlands are part of the Drakensberg alti-montane grasslands and woodlands ecoregion.

== Fauna ==
The Lesotho Highlands are one of the endemic bird areas of the world.

The Drakensberg Rockjumper is an endemic bird species of the Lesotho Highlands and areas surrounding them in South Africa.

== Threats and preservation ==
The Lesotho Highlands Water Project (LHWP) is an ongoing water supply and hydropower project in the area of the Highlands. Developed in partnership between the governments of Lesotho and South Africa, it comprises a system of several large dams and tunnels throughout the territory of both countries. The project allegedly is said to have had so far negative social and environmental effects.

== See also ==
- Great Escarpment, Southern Africa
- Lesotho Highlands Water Project
- Climate Change in Lesotho
