= Lesotho Highlands Water Project =

Water supply and hydropower project between South Africa and Lesotho

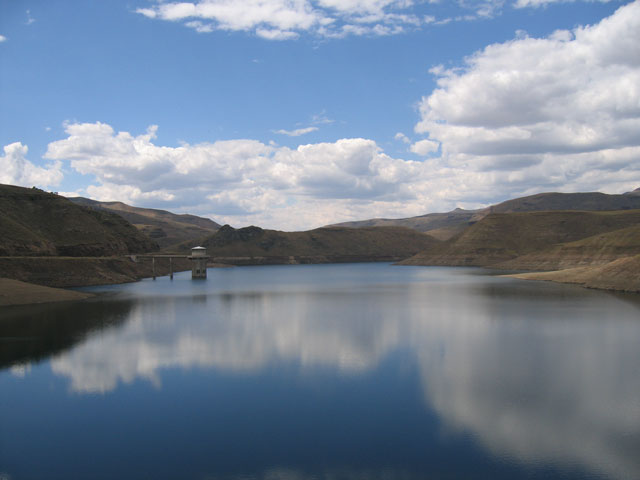
Katse Dam reservoir and intake tower

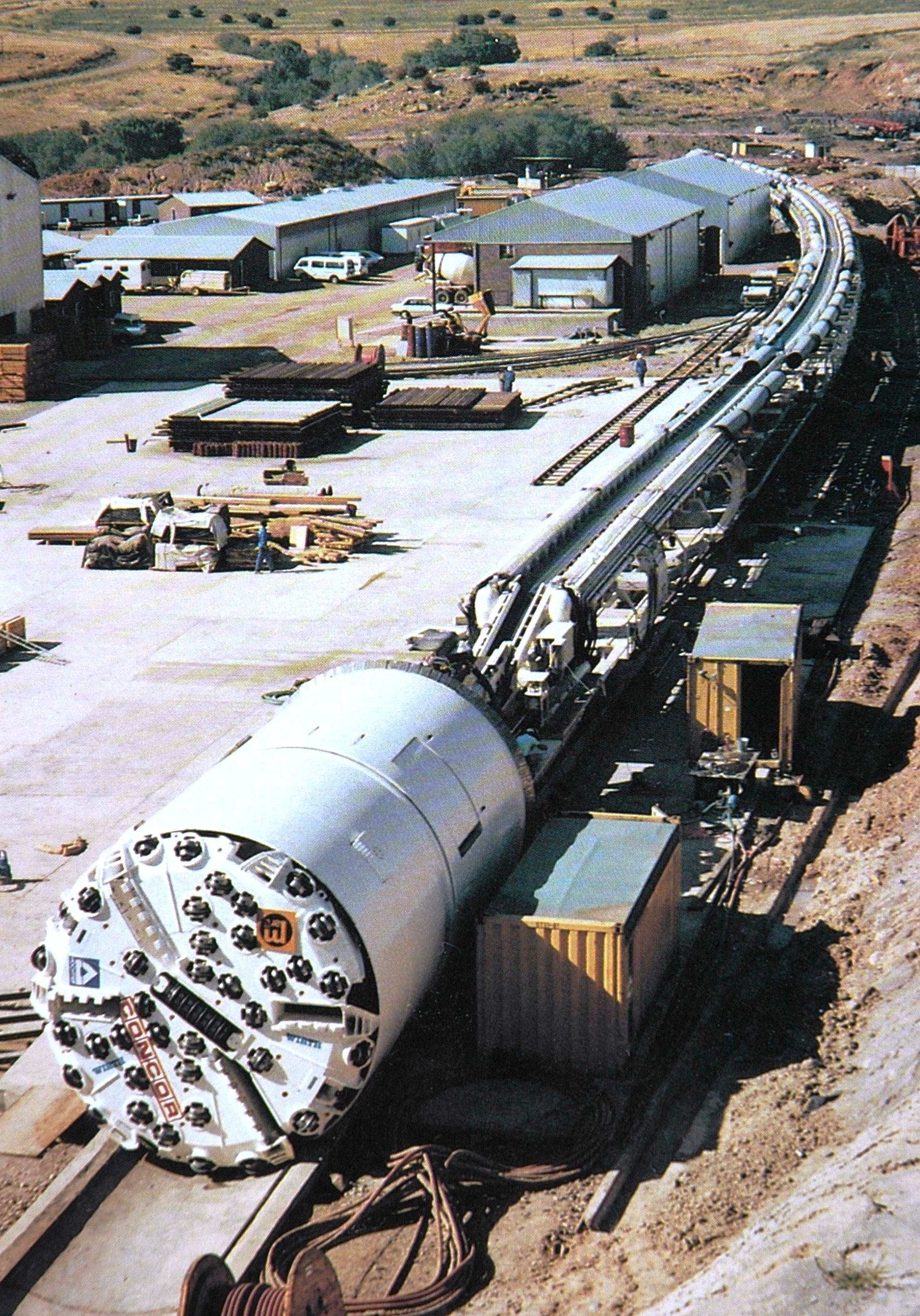
A 320 metre long WIRTH 529 tunnel boring machine used on the project

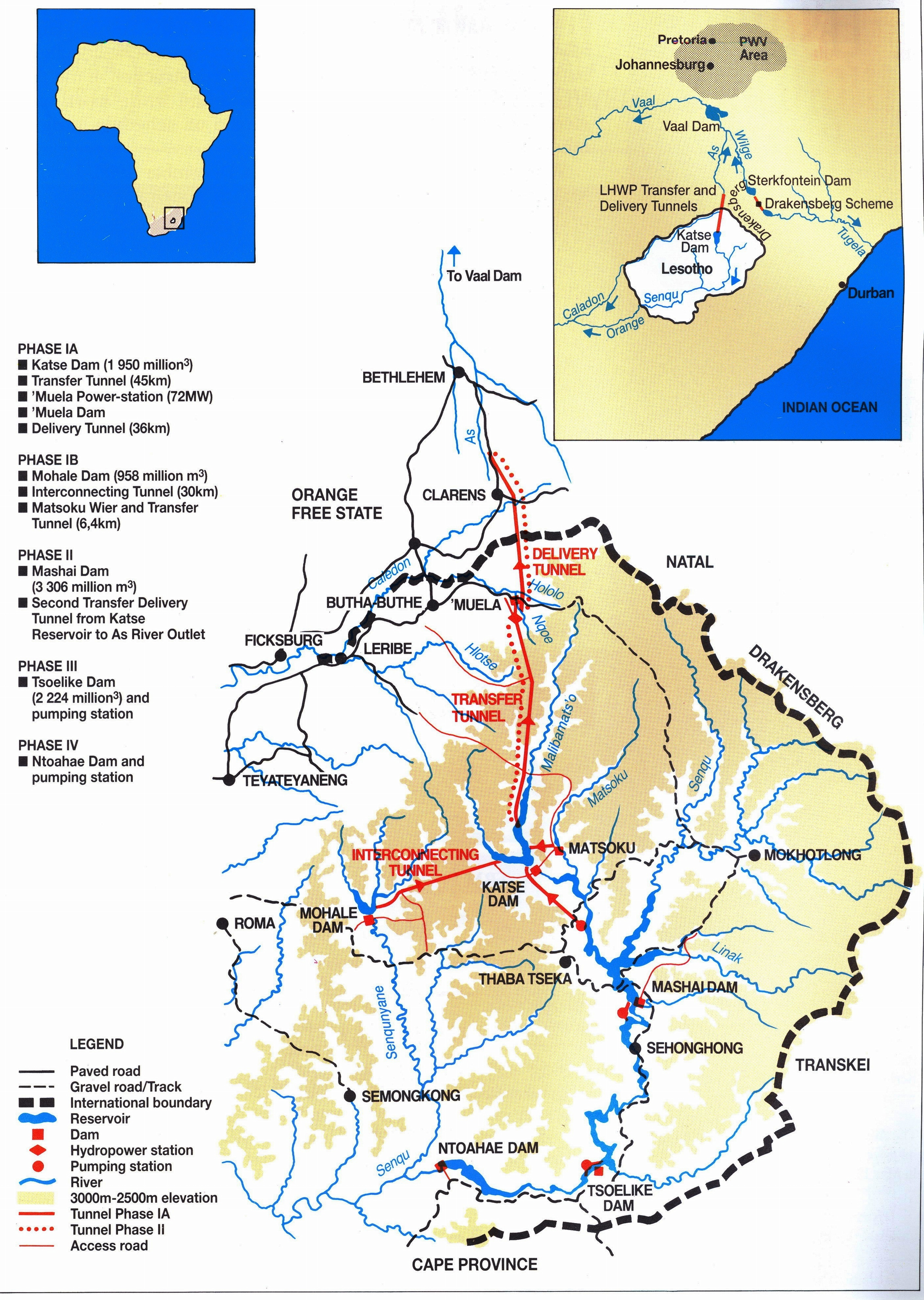
Lesotho Highlands Water Project

The Lesotho Highlands Water Project (LHWP) is an ongoing water supply project with a hydropower component, developed in partnership between the governments of Lesotho and South Africa. It comprises a system of several large dams and tunnels throughout Lesotho and delivers water to the Vaal River System in South Africa. In Lesotho, it involves the rivers Malibamatso, Matsoku, Senqunyane, and Senqu. It is Africa's largest water transfer scheme.

The purpose of the project is to provide Lesotho with a source of revenue in exchange for the provision of water to South Africa, as well as generate hydroelectricity for Lesotho. As of 2015, royalties paid by South Africa to the Lesotho government amount to R780 million, equivalent to about 5 percent of Lesotho's state income outside of taxes. The hydro-electric power has enabled Lesotho to become self-sufficient in electricity production, however criticisms have included loss of livelihoods for displaced people and ecological impacts.

== History ==
Efforts to create a dam in the location were spearheaded by then British High Commissioner Sir Evelyn Baring in the 1950s, after initially being conceived by the South African civil engineer Ninham Shand while carrying out investigations commissioned by the British Government into the rivers of Lesotho. As initially conceived, the project was known as the Oxbow Scheme.

After a feasibility study was conducted between August 1983 and August 1986 by the German-British Lahmeyer MacDonald Consortium, the project eventually began to be realized. The project has been alleged to have had negative social and environmental effects. While compensation was provided in kind and paid to the few hundred households affected by the dams, there is criticism that it was insufficient.

In recent years, water from the scheme has been discharged into the Mohokare (Caledon) river to provide water to Maseru in times of critical shortages. The new dams have filled as anticipated and discharge of water from the dams into the downstream rivers continues in a scheme devised to preserve ecological balances. This discharged water flows to the Senqu (Orange) and while preserving the ecological status quo benefits only those communities along the rivers.

The project has had an important impact on Lesotho's infrastructure, as hundreds of kilometers of engineered paved roads were built in order to improve access to the different construction sites, together with engineered unpaved 'feeder' roads around the dams.

Since its inception, the project has been dogged by corruption which has resulted in a number of court cases involving both individuals and multinational corporations.

== Project features ==
Below is an overview of the main features of the first three phases of the project.

	Phase IA	Phase IB	Phase II	Phase III
Name	Katse Dam	Mohale Dam	Polihali Dam	Tsoelike Dam
Dam height (m)	185	145	165	155
Power generation (Note: The values are estimates based on the feasibility study, and may differ from the current or eventual values, respectively.) (MW) (installed capacity)	110	does not generate power	3-8 (potentially)	N/A
Water transfer capacity (m³/s)	16.9	10.1	28.0	8.6
Transfer tunnels	Yes	Yes	Yes	No
Delivery tunnels	Yes	No	No	No
Completed	1998	2003	Under Construction (Estimated completion end of 2028)	No (On hold)

== Phase I ==
Phase of the project comprises all the essential components to impound water in the Katse Dam, generate electricity and deliver water to the Vaal River System. Phase I has been carefully configured so that Katse Dam remains the common link to further phases identified during feasibility studies. In line with the phased approach, Phase I consists of Phase IA comprising the essential components, and Phase IB which enhances the yield of the project with the addition of two peripheral sources namely the Mohale Dam and the Matsoku Weir.

=== Phase IA ===
This phase of the project was completed in 1998. It consisted mainly of the construction of the Katse Dam on the Malibamatšo River in Lesotho. A 45-kilometre (28 mi) transfer tunnel was built from the Katse Dam to the Muela Reservoir. The Muela Reservoir is considered to be the tail pond, which supplies hydroelectric power for Lesotho. Stemming from the Muela Reservoir is a 37-kilometre (23 mi) delivery tunnel to the outfall at the As River from where water flows to the Vaal Dam. Although the Katse Dam has power generation capability for local use, the primary purpose is as the storage reservoir for Phase IA, and to provide discharge into the transfer tunnel.

To mitigate loss of habitat, the Katse Botanical Gardens was established to house plants that were rescued from the area to be flooded.

=== Phase IB ===
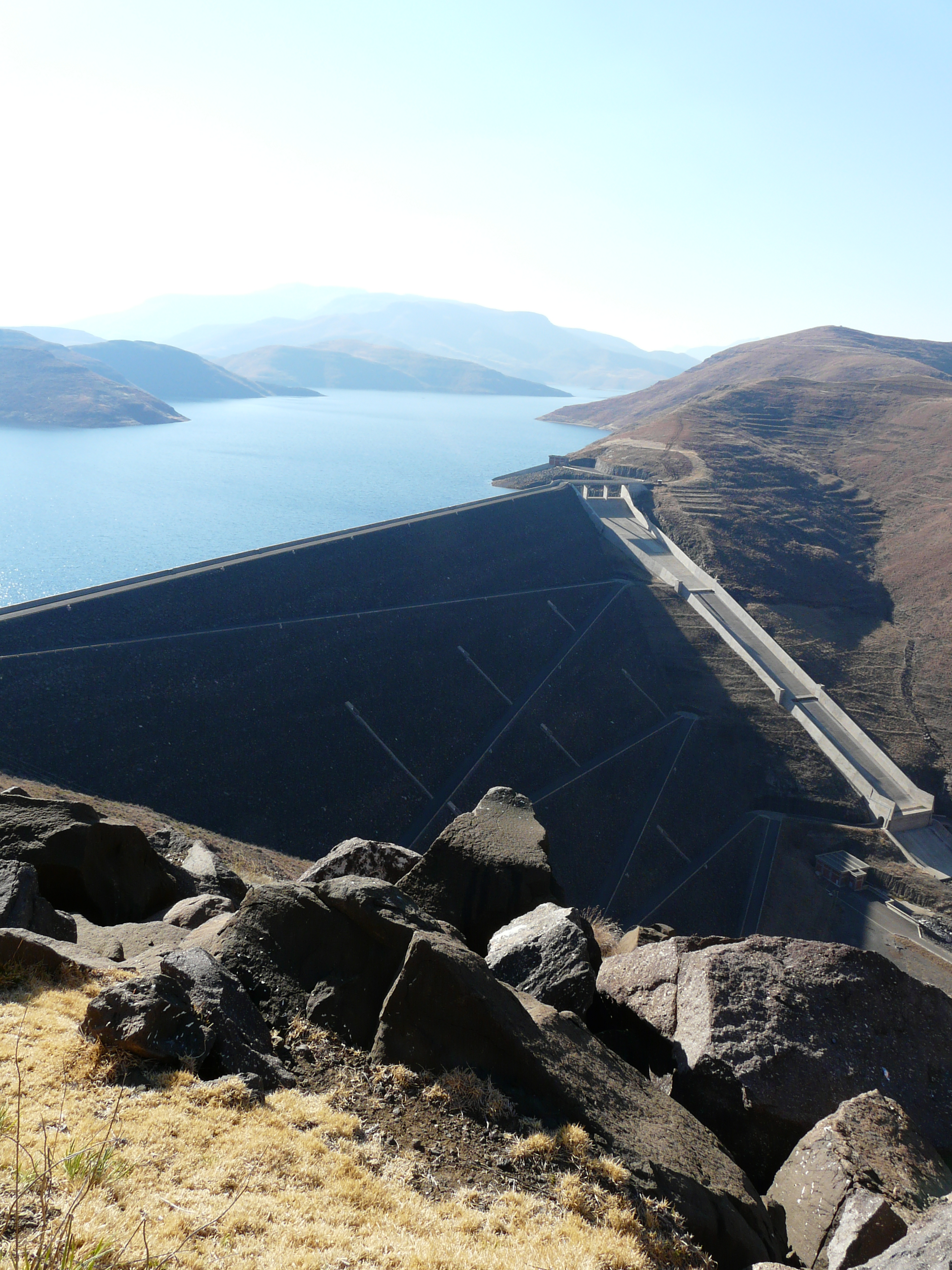
Mohale Dam and reservoir

This phase of the project was completed in 2002. It consisted mainly of the construction of:

- The Mohale Dam, a very large rockfill dam, located on the Senqunyane River;
- A 32-kilometre (20 mi) transfer tunnel between the Mohale Dam and the Katse Dam;
- Construction of the Matsoku Diversion Weir;
- A 5.7-kilometre (3.5 mi) tunnel from the Matsoku Diversion Weir to the Katse Dam.

The system is interconnected in such a way that water may be transferred in either direction for storage in Mohale or ultimate transfer to South Africa through the Katse reservoir.

== Phase II ==
- In 2005, an agreement between the Governments of South Africa and Lesotho was signed to proceed with feasibility studies;
- In 2006, the feasibility study was commenced and completed in late 2008;
- The agreement to implement Phase II was signed in Maseru on 11 August 2011;
- The launch of Phase II construction took place at Tlokoeng on 27 March 2014.
- The COVID-19 pandemic caused construction to be delayed. Construction of diversion tunnels for the Polihali Dam did not start as planned in early 2020

The CEO of the LHWP implementing body of the Lesotho Highlands Development Authority (LHDA), Refiloe Tlali, said: "the 2.3-billion cubic metre Polihali dam will be built downstream of the confluence of the Senqu and Khubelu rivers. The dam will have a 163.5 m high concrete-faced rockfill embankment dam wall. The crest length will be 915 m, with a full supply level of 2,075 m above sea level. A 49.5 m high saddle dam and spillway will also be built."

Upon completion phase 2 will enable over 400 million cubic metres of water to flow from Lesotho to the Vaal Dam and will move the total volume of water being transferred from Lesotho to South Africa to over 1.27 billion cubic metres per year. The Trans Caledon Tunnel Authority will raise most of the R40 billion required to complete phase 2.

In August 2023, the Trans-Caledon Tunnel Authority (TCTA) secured funding from the New Development Bank amounting to 3.2 billion South African rand (approx. US$172 million) to be applied to the continuation of Phase 2. This loan is in addition to US$86.72 million borrowed from the African Development Bank as well as funding from other sources. The engineering, procurement and construction (EPC) contractor is a consortium comprising Salini Impregilo and Cooperativa Muratori Cementistri (CMC di Ravenna), both from Italy, CMI Infrastructure Company of South Africa and LSP Construction of Lesotho. Completion of phase 2 is expected in 2028.

== Later phases ==
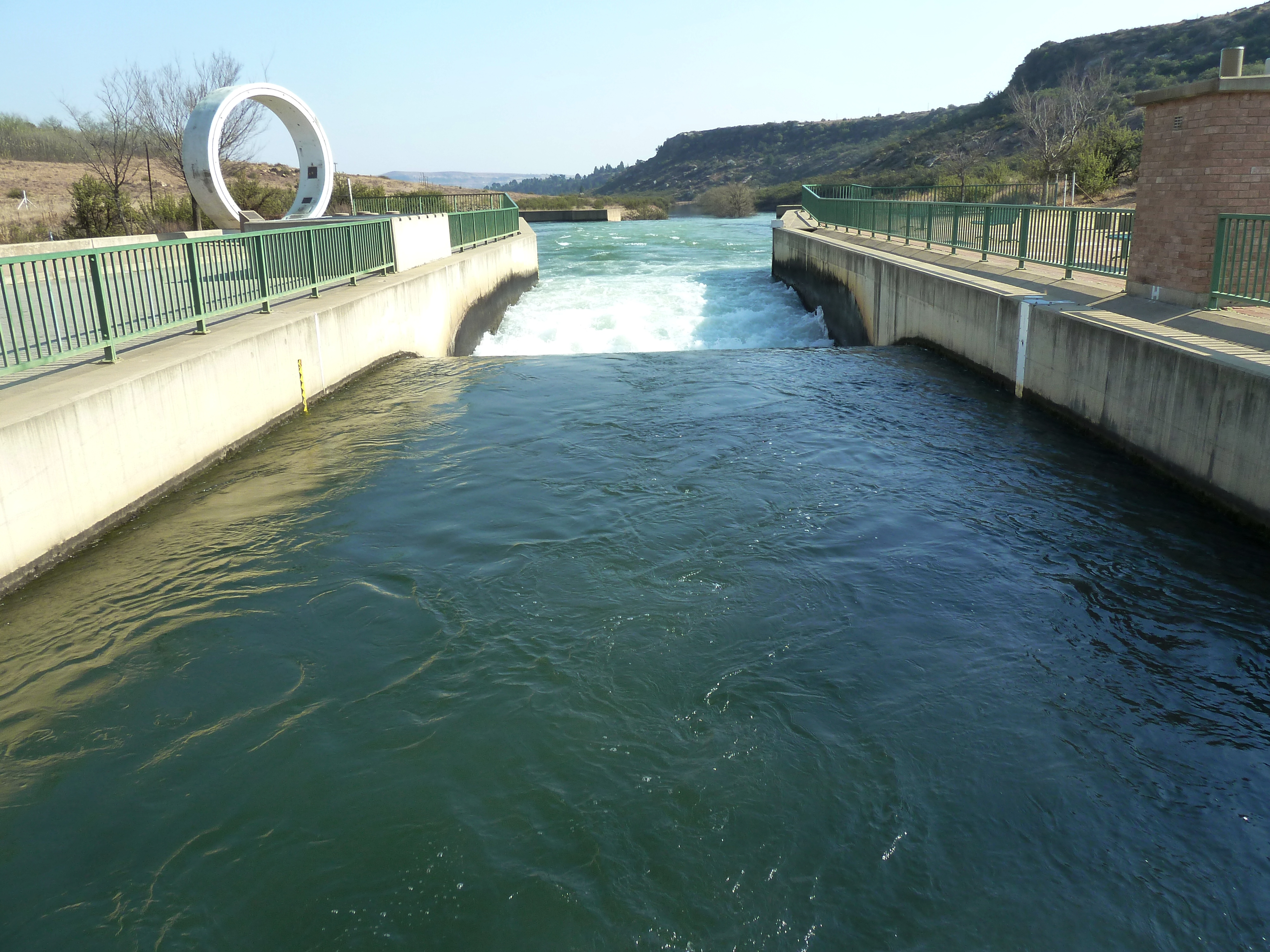
The As River Outfall is situated 9 km north of Clarens and was opened in 1998. The As delivers water to the Saulspoort Dam and Liebenbergsvlei and Wilge Rivers beyond, where after the water enters the Vaal Dam.

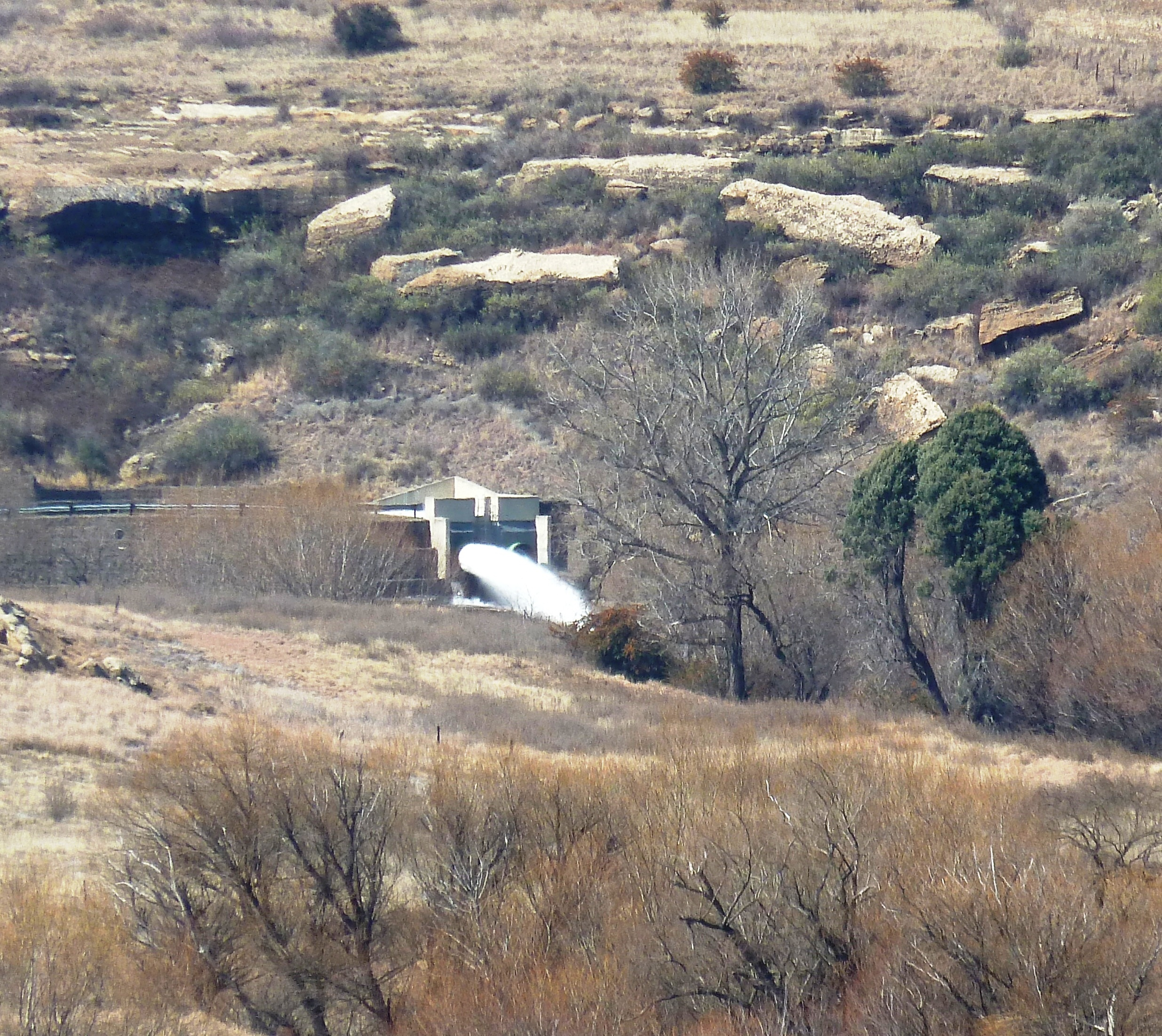
The discharge point in the Little Caledon River east of Clarens, which serves as a conduit to the Caledon (or Mohokare) River.

As initially conceived, three further dams were proposed further downstream after the Malibamatso joins the Senqu river, at Mashai, Tsoelike, and Ntoahae.

In 2007, further studies resulted in a modification, proposing instead a dam on the Senqu, upstream from its confluence with the Malibamatso. This is currently the preferred extension of the scheme, although construction has not yet begun (as of November 2021).

== See also ==
- Lesotho Highlands
