= As River =

River in South Africa

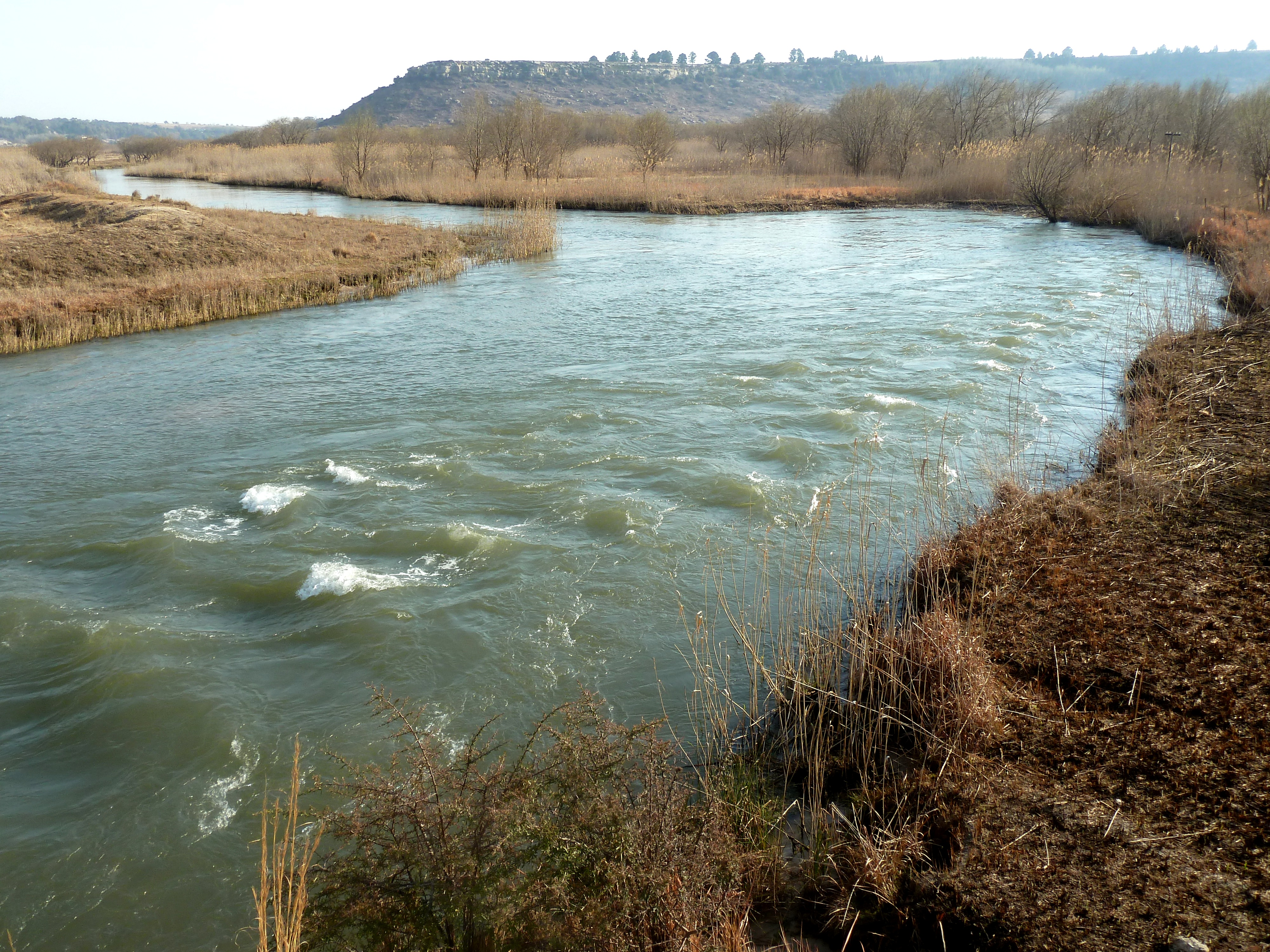

- Location within South Africa

Location
- Country: South Africa
- Province: Free State

Physical characteristics
- Source
  - coordinates: 28°30′38″S 28°21′47″E
  - elevation: 2,160 m (7,090 ft)
- Mouth
  - coordinates: 28°16′36″S 28°22′22″E
  - elevation: 1,630 m (5,350 ft)
- Length: 50 km (31 mi)
- Discharge
  - average: 18 m^{3}/s (640 cu ft/s)

The As River is a tributary of the Liebenbergsvlei River in the eastern Free State, South Africa. Since 1968 it is impounded by the Sol Plaatje Dam (formerly: Saulspoort Dam) at its confluence with the latter river, just east of Bethlehem. Its origin is some 35 km southeast of Bethlehem, on the northern slopes of the Rooiberge, near Clarens. With the opening of the northern delivery tunnel of the Lesotho Highlands Water Project in 1998, the once tiny stream was transformed to a strong-flowing river.

== Water delivery ==
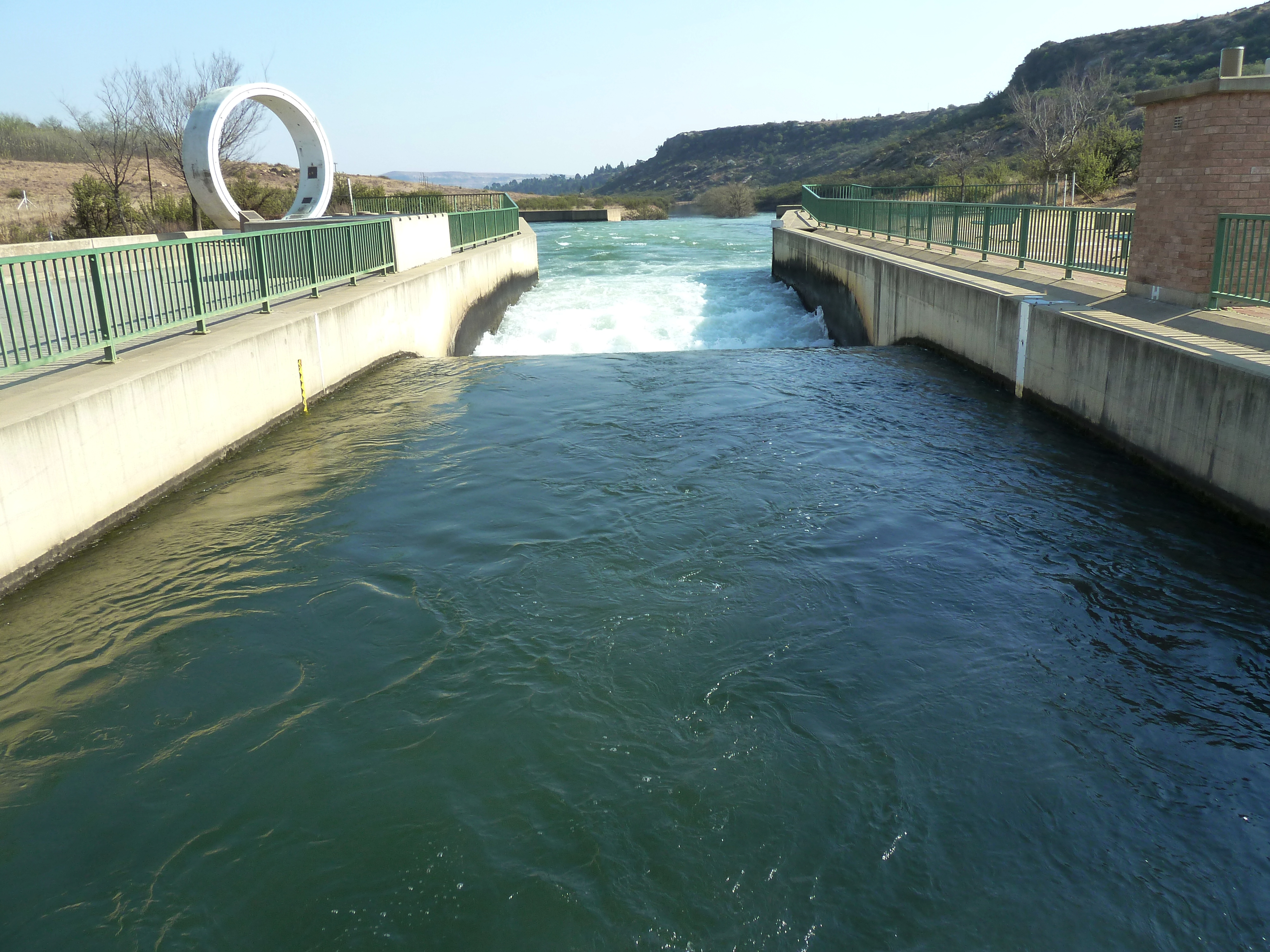
The As River Outfall of the Lesotho Highlands Water Project, situated 9 km north of Clarens, was opened in 1998.

The As River is one of the discharge points for the Lesotho Highlands Water Project. As of 2004, 18 cubic meters of water was released per second, and the river's flow is consequently not seasonally variable.

The Stortemelk Dam, situated downstream of the outfall, was one measure taken by the then Department of Water Affairs, to stabilize water flow and limit erosion. By 2004, four weirs had been built.

== Power generation ==
Two privately owned hydro powered power plants, the Sol Plaatje and Merino, were commissioned in 2009 and 2012 respectively, and supply a total of 7 MW to the power grid. The automated and low maintenance Stortemelk Hydropower Project at the Botterkloof Dam is set to contribute a further 4.4 MW to the power grid, starting July 2016.

== Ecological impact ==
The opening of the northern delivery tunnel in 1998 caused physical and chemical changes to the river, as water volumes increased and water temperature decreased, scouring of the river channel occurred, and much silt was deposited in Saulspoort Dam. Populations of key indicator species like smallmouth and largemouth yellowfish decreased, and seven of the river's nine fish species disappeared from the outfall's vicinity. Recovery of invertebrates was only noticeable some kilometers downstream, and the weirs proved ineffective when water is released in high volumes. Though much habitat is still available, the river's population by aquatic organisms is limited by water turbidity, low water temperature and its erosion potential.

== Etymology ==
The name is often mistranslated from Afrikaans to English as "Ash River". The name, however, refers to a wagon axle which, according to legend, broke near the river (the Afrikaans word for an axle being "as"); therefore a correct translation would be "Axle River", and not "Ash River".

== See also ==
- List of rivers of South Africa
- List of reservoirs and dams in South Africa
