= Katse Botanical Gardens =

Botanical gardens in Katse village, Lesotho

- Interactive map of Katse Botanical Gardens
- Type: Botanical
- Location: Katse Village, Lesotho
- Coordinates: 29.33472°S 28.48142°E
- Area: 17 hectares (42 acres)
- Opened: 1996
- Owner: Lesotho Highlands Development Authority
- Status: Open All Year
- Collections: Alpine plants
- Website: Katse Botanical Gardens

Katse Botanical Gardens is a centre for Alpine flora in Katse village, Lesotho.

The gardens were created as a result of plant rescue missions to mitigate the impact of the Katse Dam, particularly spiral aloes. The collection has a focus on traditional Sotho medicinal plants and has a large seed bank.

At an altitude of 2229 meters it claims to be the highest botanical garden in the southern hemisphere.

== See also ==
- Botanic Gardens Conservation International
- Treborth Botanic Garden, twinned with Katse Botanical Gardens
