= Katse Dam =

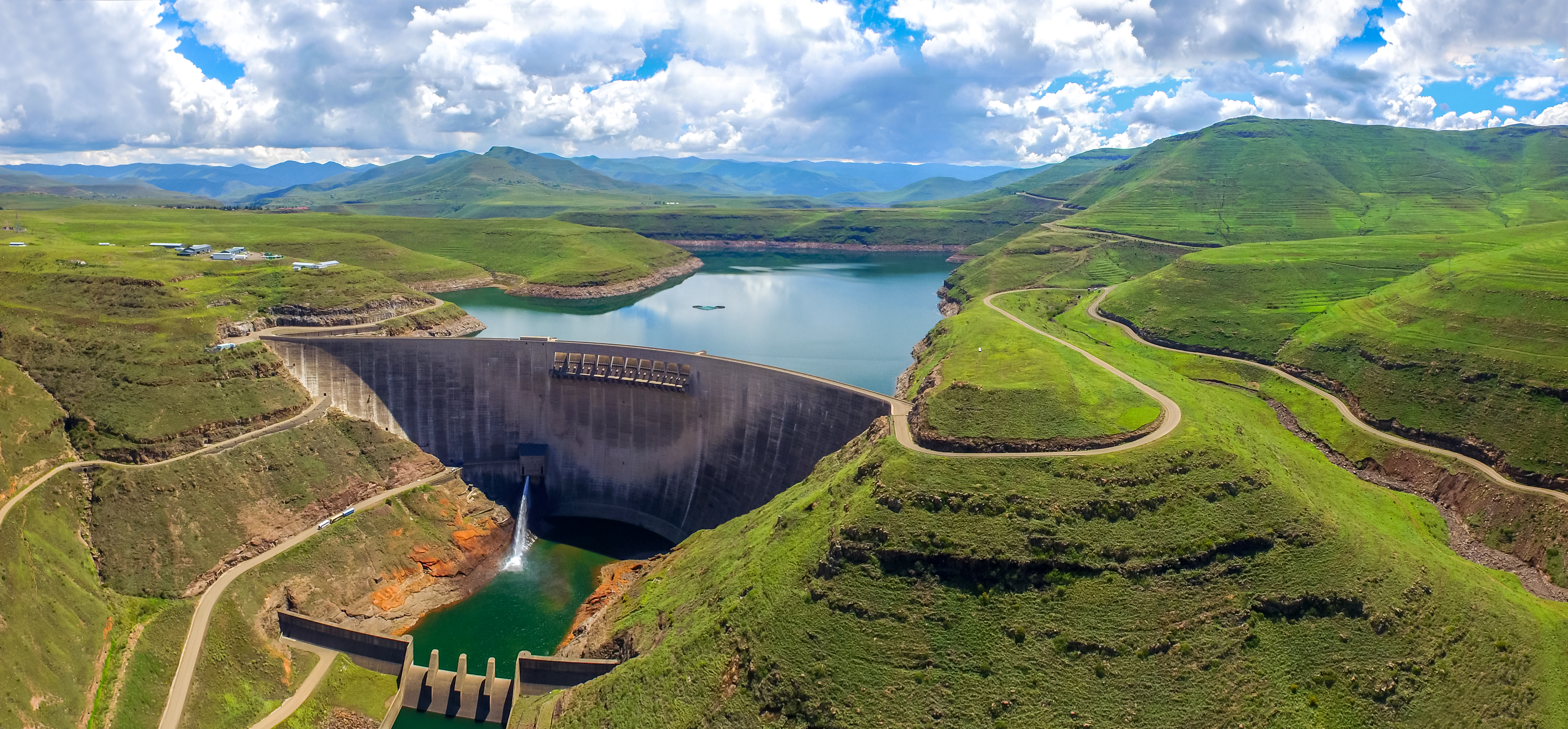
- Katse Dam
- Interactive map of Katse Dam
- Official name: Katse Dam
- Location: Lesotho
- Coordinates: 29°20′13″S 28°30′22″E
- Purpose: Irrigation and domestic
- Opening date: 1996
- Owner: Kingdom of Lesotho

Dam and spillways
- Type of dam: Arch dam
- Impounds: Malibamatšo River
- Height: 185 m (607 ft)
- Length: 710 m (2329 ft)

Reservoir
- Total capacity: 1.950 km^{3} (1,580,891 acre⋅ft)
- Surface area: 3,580 ha (8,846 acres)

The Katse Dam, a concrete arch dam on the Malibamatšo River in Lesotho, is Africa's second largest double-curvature arch dam after the Tekezé Dam in Ethiopia. Located just below the confluence of the Bokong River, which forms the western arm of the Katse reservoir, the dam is part of a larger project which will eventually include five large dams in remote rural areas.

The potential of the project was identified by the South African civil engineer Ninham Shand in 1953 as a possible means to supplement the water supply of South Africa's industrial heartland in the Witwatersrand. The World Bank arranged a treaty between the governments of South Africa and Lesotho, allowing the project to proceed.

== Construction ==
The dam was built by a consortium of Bouygues, Concor, Group 5, Hochtief, Impregilo, Kier Group and Sterling International. The dam was completed in 1996 and the reservoir filled with water by 1997. The total cost of the project was US$8 billion. Katse Airport was constructed 3 kilometres (2 mi) southeast of the dam to facilitate access to the project.

== Environmental impact ==
The mass of water gave rise to induced seismicity. Farmers who lost land to the project have had trouble re-establishing new livelihoods. There is little arable land in the mountains to replace all that was lost, and efforts to help them with new livelihoods have by no means been as successful as the engineering works. A local group has documented the project's human legacy in the rural communities directly affected by the project, and the environmental and human-rights NPO, International Rivers, produced a detailed account of the effects.

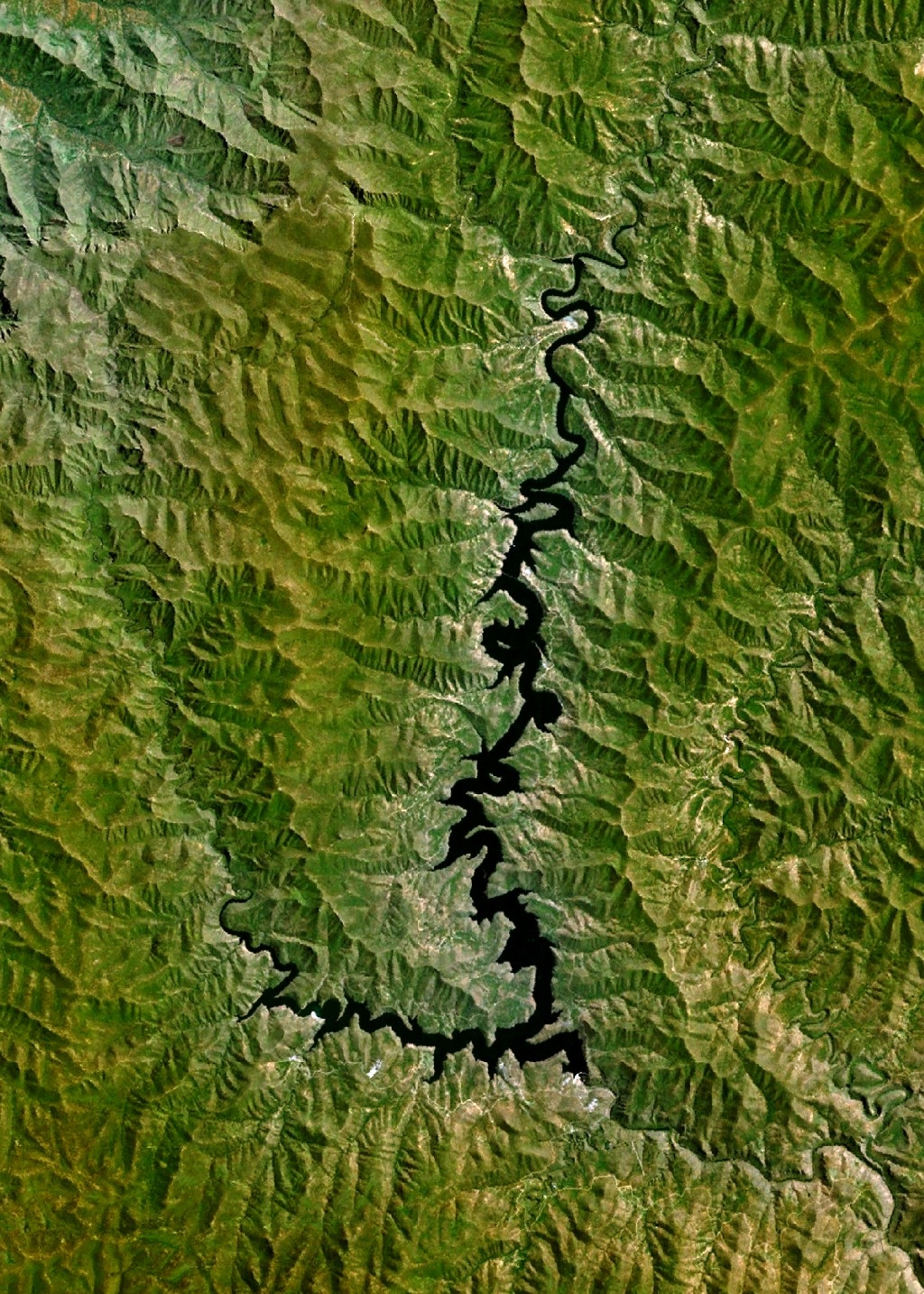
Satellite view of the reservoir

As mitigation of the loss of habitat, plant rescue missions were conducted in the area to be flooded, and Katse Botanical Gardens was established to house and propagate the plants rescued.

== Water delivery ==
Aerial video footage of the Katse Dam.

Water from the dam first travels through a 45 kilometres (28 mi), 4 metres (13 ft) diameter tunnel, exiting at a hydroelectric station near Muela. The dam's high elevation allows a gravity flow water delivery system to South Africa, in addition to hydroelectric power for Lesotho, and was a prime reason behind the choice of site.

Water delivery officially began on 22 January 1998. The dam currently supplies about 30 cubic metres per second (1,100 cu ft/s) of water to South Africa, which pays Lesotho $35 million per year, plus a variable royalty based on calculated water usage benefits.

In recent years, water from the scheme has also been discharged into the Mohokare (Caledon) River to provide water to Lesotho's capital Maseru in times of shortages. The new dams have filled as anticipated and discharge of water from the dams into the downstream rivers continues in a scheme devised to preserve ecological balances. This discharged water flows to the Senqu (Orange) River, and while preserving the ecological status quo, it benefits only those communities along the rivers. Schemes to provide water supplies to displaced Highlands farmers have not been very successful.

The dam project has also been a source of widespread corruption, which is not uncommon with large dam projects. The Lesotho courts have taken the unusual step of prosecuting the large companies involved in the scandal in addition to the Lesotho bureaucrat who took the bribes. Thus far, there have been a number of convictions and at least one company debarred by the World Bank for its role in the scandal.

== Intake tower water transfer ==
The intake tower is located approximately 18 kilometres (11 mi) north of Katse Dam and has been designed to accommodate 70 cubic metres per second (2,500 cu ft/s) which was the maximum transfer originally envisaged for full implementation of the LHWP. The intake tower is 23 metres (75 ft) in diameter and 98 metres (322 ft) high to accommodate the large range in reservoir storage elevation as well as to facilitate the draw-off at four distinct lake levels. This will enable the quality of the transferred water to be controlled at all times. Due to the position and design of the intake tower, there is a certain volume of water in the reservoir that cannot be accessed via the transfer tunnels. This dead storage is approximately 430,000,000 cubic metres (350,000 acre⋅ft), with the result that the effective live storage behind Katse Dam is reduced from the total storage capacity of 1,950 million m³ to 1,520 million m³.

== Dam features ==
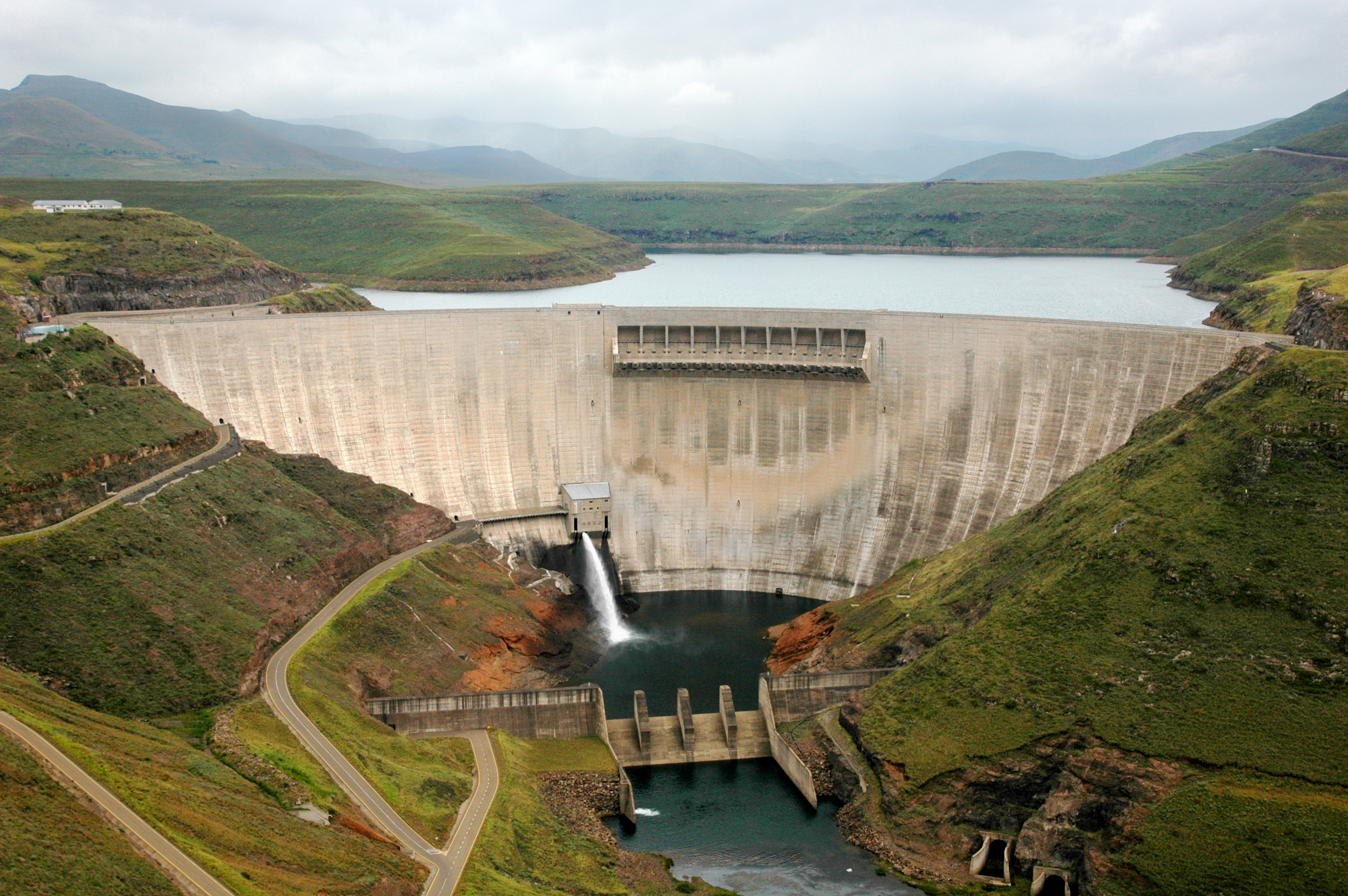
Alternative view of Katse Dam

- Height - 185 m (607 ft) (second tallest in Africa)
- Crest length - 710 m (2,330 ft)
- Design - double arch, concrete
- Concrete - 2,320,000 m^{3} (3,030,000 cu yd)
- Elevation - 1,993 m (6,539 ft) above sea level (highest elevation dam in Africa)

== See also ==
- Lesotho Highlands Water Project
- Mohale Dam
