= Matela =

Matela may refer to:

== Places ==
=== Portugal ===
- Antas e Matela, a parish in the municipality of Penalva do Castelo, Viseu
- Matela, a parish in the municipality of Vimioso, Bragança

=== Nepal ===
- Matela, Bheri, a village in Surkhet District
- Matela, Seti, a village in Bajhang District

== People ==
- Len Matela (born 1980), retired American professional basketball player
- Leszek Matela (born 1955), Polish journalist

== See also ==
- Mattress (French: matelas)
- Ha Matela (disambiguation)
