= Water supply and sanitation in Lesotho =

Lesotho is a mountainous and fairly 'water-rich country', but suffers from a lack of clean drinking water due to inadequate sanitation. In recent decades, with the construction of dams for the Lesotho Highlands Water Project (LHWP), Lesotho has become the main provider of water to parts of Northern South Africa. Despite the economic and infrastructure development occasioned by the LHWP, waterborne diseases are common in the country and the infant mortality rate from them is high. In 2017, a project to improve the rural water supply in the Lesotho Lowlands was funded by the Global Environment Facility and the African Development Bank, and is ongoing.

== Clean water and sanitation ==
Lesotho faces issues with clean water and sanitation; most notably access to drinkable water sources that are uncontaminated and inadequate public sanitation. With a government that does not support many large water projects to improve infrastructure and hygienic practices because they consider them to be cost ineffective, little progress has been made in providing clean water and sanitation to the citizens of Lesotho. Foreign and Lesotho NGOs play an important role in the region, especially in the more rural confines of the country.

=== History ===
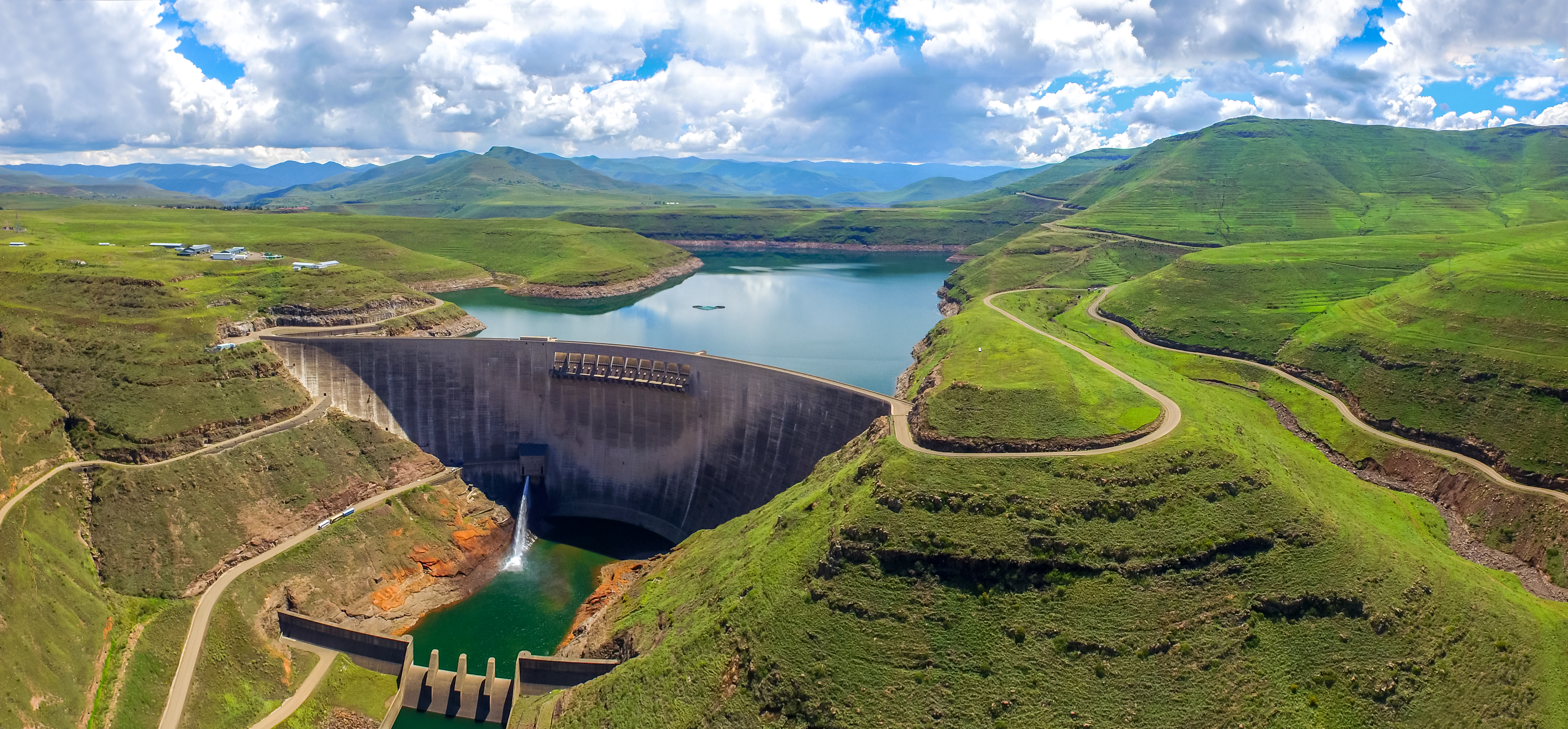
Katse Dam in Lesotho, part of the Lesotho Highlands Water Project

The idea for the Lesotho Highlands Water Project (LHWP) originated in the late 1970s; however, it was not until a military coup had overthrown the government of Lesotho in 1986 that the project was established. The LHWP was a cooperation between South Africa and Lesotho's newly-installed government, although the arrangement played clearly in South Africa's favor. The project was such that South Africa would construct a five-series set of dams starting in the Lesotho Highlands by digging tunnels within the gorges of the Maluti Mountains, taking the southern flow of the Malibamatšo River and directing it north towards South Africa.

The LHWP was estimated at a budget of US$5.6 billion and included a hydroelectric plant that Lesotho alone was responsible for constructing alongside these dams. The Lesotho government had sold their citizens on the idea of economic gain from such a large project. With the assistance of the Development Bank of South Africa (DBSA) and World Bank (WB) funding the dams, and the European Community funding the hydroelectric component, the project came into being with construction planned over the next 30 years, overshooting Lesotho's 5-year development plan cycles, and was to have been completed by 2016. The first dam was scheduled to be completed by 1996.

=== Microbial examination ===
The World Health Organization (WHO) conducted a study between July 1992 and January 1993 on the region within approximately 1,000 sq. miles of the 20-year old hydroelectric facility that resulted from the LHWP. The study included 72 remote villages' water sources. Three categories helped identify the levels of contamination and whether or not these were safe sources of consumable water for the villagers: unimproved was considered a natural source of water from open springs, and reservoirs; semi-improved indicated that the source of water had been manipulated or treated to inhibit human and animal contamination; improved water sources were usually completely covered and protected from outside elements with channels that secluded the source of water into silt-boxes for later consumption, further eliminating contamination.

The WHO also surveyed 588 households about their access to clean water: 38% of the 588 households claimed they had access to improved water sources. However, fewer than 5% used pit latrines and 18% of children under the age of five had experienced diarrheal illnesses within the two weeks prior to the study. The study found that most unimproved and semi-improved sources of drinking water had a presence of total Coliform (TC) and Escherichia coli (E. coli) exceeding the standards set by the U.S. Environmental Protection Agency (EPA) at approximately >16 organisms per 100 ml, compared to the EPA standard of <1 organism per 100ml, preferably non-existent. In addition, 83% of all improved water sources were found to be E. coli ridden.

The WHO concluded that because of the LHWP, the service roads built were a sign of slow infrastructure improvement and that the surrounding communities should stay patient as infrastructure for water supplies should follow in the years to come. Except for the more rural mountainous areas that have no accessible roads available all year round and their contamination of drinkable water has stayed intact. They suggested that villagers begin to implement hygienic habits that discontinue self-pollution and defecation within their own natural resources.

A similar study followed about two decades later. Conducted in 2011, the Department of Environmental Health (DEH) at the University of Lesotho examined the microbacterial contaminants in the drinking water of the Maseru district of the Manonyane community. Their scientific study included 22 springs, 6 open wells, 6 private boreholes and 1 open reservoir. They also conducted household surveys to assess the citizens' hygienic practices in and around the water sources sampled.

The surveys revealed the lack of consideration of contamination of local drinking water. Whether it was laundry run-off or leaking pit latrines or livestock feces, the lack of consideration was apparent because the citizens were not properly educated on the hygienic process. This poor sanitation has led to 1.6 million child deaths under the age of five because 84% of children reside in rural communities.

The water sources sampled were analyzed within a 6-hour timeframe and properly stored within a cool refrigerator on the way to the lab for accurate results. What they found in the samples was compared to the WHO definition of acceptable fecal matter and associated rick categories (chart below).

Colony-Forming Unit (cfu) Risk Levels
Coliform Risk	Level
Conformity	0 cfu/100 ml
Low	1–10 cfu/100 ml
Intermediate	1–100 cfu/100 ml
High	100–1000 cfu/100 ml
Very High	41000 cfu/100 ml

Of the 35 water sources sampled, 34 of the drinkable water sources exceeded the WHO no-risk guidelines of 0 cfu/100 ml of water, while 50% of the 34 were at high risk of contamination. Even the sources of water considered improved had experienced recent rainfall that leaked contaminated fecal matter into the water.

The DEH used this study to convey the issues of hygienic practices and lack of routine inspection of protected water sources. Their suggestion is for the citizens of the Manonyane community to implement health programs that educate the villagers to begin practicing safer hygienic techniques, like discontinuing laundry near water sources and using latrines that are fortified and unable to leak, as well as keeping livestock clear away from human drinking water sources to decrease human and animal contamination within their local water sources.

=== Water insecurity ===
The government of Lesotho has had failed projects to bring drinkable and sanitary water and sanitation services to the rural communities of Lesotho. These failed attempts have left the government to focus less on the impending costs of overhauling sanitary water conditions in favor of more lucrative ventures. In turn the people of Lesotho have had increasing numbers of water-borne diseases. Studies have shown correlation to poor access of clean water as a source of household illness and a large demographic epidemic by HIV/AIDS. These insecurities cause negative thoughts and feelings about the water the citizens of Lesotho consume. With the introduction and increased spread of HIV/AIDS over the past decades, Lesotho has seen it affect more skilled water and sanitation workers, ultimately leading to their deaths. This decreases the availability of clean water, which in turns leads to lower access due to droughts and climate change. These syndemic issues have been growing more apparent and have yet to be addressed.

=== Recent developments ===
On February 13, 2017 the Global Environment Facility (GEF) in partnership with the African Development Bank (AfDB) decided to finance the climate change adaptation for Sustainable Rural Water Supply in the Lesotho Lowlands. The GEF will be funding $4.4 million and the AfDB $17 million respectively. This project is to improve clean water and sanitation for the rural communities of the Lesotho Lowlands in response to recent climate change and managing resources more efficiently after the recent drought. The project will help sustain rural communities with potable water. Their plan is to implement watersheds to protect imported water supply from reoccurring droughts and possible floods.

The funds will be distributed through the Least Developed Countries Fund (LDCF), established under the United Nations Framework Convention on Climate Change. This project is in direct correlation with the National Adaptation Plans of Lesotho to improve the water and sanitation supply of their country, especially in rural communities. The funds will address sustainability of resources and inspire innovation for more jobs and economic growth within the guidelines of the Bank's Strategy for 2013–2022.

The second phase of the Lesotho Lowlands Water Supply Scheme, the Lowlands Water Development Project, seeks to increase water security and climate resilience in four areas of Lesotho's Lowlands. The project will address the nation's susceptibility to the detrimental effects of climate change on water security by including infrastructure to generate clean water in large quantities, enhance distribution networks and sanitation, and boost the efficiency of water usage. The project will also receive €116 million in funding from the European Investment Bank.
