= Abia, Lesotho =

Abia
- Community Council / Constituency
- Geographic Center of Community
- Coordinates: 29°22′57″S 27°32′15″E
- Country: Lesotho
- District: Maseru District
- Elevation: 5,056 ft (1,541 m)

Population (2006)
  - Total: 17,449
- Time zone: UTC+2 (CAT)
- Coordinates computed from Lesotho Villages file.

Abia is a constituency and community council in the Maseru Municipality located in the Maseru District of Lesotho. The population in 2006 was 17,449.

== Villages ==
The community of Abia includes the villages of Ha 'Nelese, Ha Abia, Ha Bosofo, Ha Joele, Ha Lesia, Ha Mapetla, Ha Matala, Ha Nkhahle, Ha Penapena, Ha Raleboela, Khongoana-Ntšo, Khubelu, Liraoeleng, Makhoakhoeng, Mapeseleng, Masianokeng, Matala Phase I, Shalabeng and Tšieng.
