= Eupithecia liqalaneng =

Scientific classification
- Kingdom: Animalia
- Phylum: Arthropoda
- Clade: Pancrustacea
- Class: Insecta
- Order: Lepidoptera
- Family: Geometridae
- Genus: Eupithecia
- Species: E. liqalaneng

Binomial name
- Eupithecia liqalaneng Krüger, 1999/2000

Species of moth

Eupithecia liqalaneng is a moth in the family Geometridae. It is found in Lesotho and South Africa. It is named after its type locality, Likalaneng.

The forewing length is 10–12 mm (0.39–0.47 in) for males and 11–12 mm (0.43–0.47 in) for females.
