= Ha Matela =

Ha Matela may refer to:

- Ha Matela, a village in Makhoarane, Lesotho
- Ha Matela, a village in 'Moteng, Lesotho
- Ha Matela, a village in Ratau, Lesotho
