= Khafung =

- Community Council / Constituency
- Geographic Center of Community
- Coordinates: 29°07′00″S 27°55′00″E
- Country: Lesotho
- District: Berea District
- Elevation: 4,816 ft (1,468 m)

Population (2006)
  - Total: 25,660
- Time zone: UTC+2 (CAT)

Khafung is a constituency located in the Berea District of Lesotho. The population in 2006 was 25,660.

== Villages ==
Ha Tšekelo
Ha Motsoaole
Ha Mosethe
Ha Mosoeunyane
Ha Mokhehle
Ha Monnanyane
Ha Rapopo
Ha Libenyane
Ha Ramachine
Ha Chaba

Ha Tšoeunyane
Ha Phiri
Ha Lebina
Ha Phoofolo
Ha Mokhethi
Ha Mosobela
Ha Ramotete
Lipatolong
Sebala-Bala
Ha Morolong

Ha Ntebele
Kolone
Mamathe
Cana
Paballong
Ha Mamathe
Ha Lenea
Ha Seoka
Ha Lenea (Ha Mamathe)
Ha Malesela

Tilimaneng
Khalahali
Ha Mphetlane
Thota-Peli
Ha Jane
Ha Matseleli
Ha Phalatsane
Ha Rantung
Ha Kholopane
Ha Hlaonyane
