= Kome Caves =

Settlement and heritage site in Berea, Lesotho

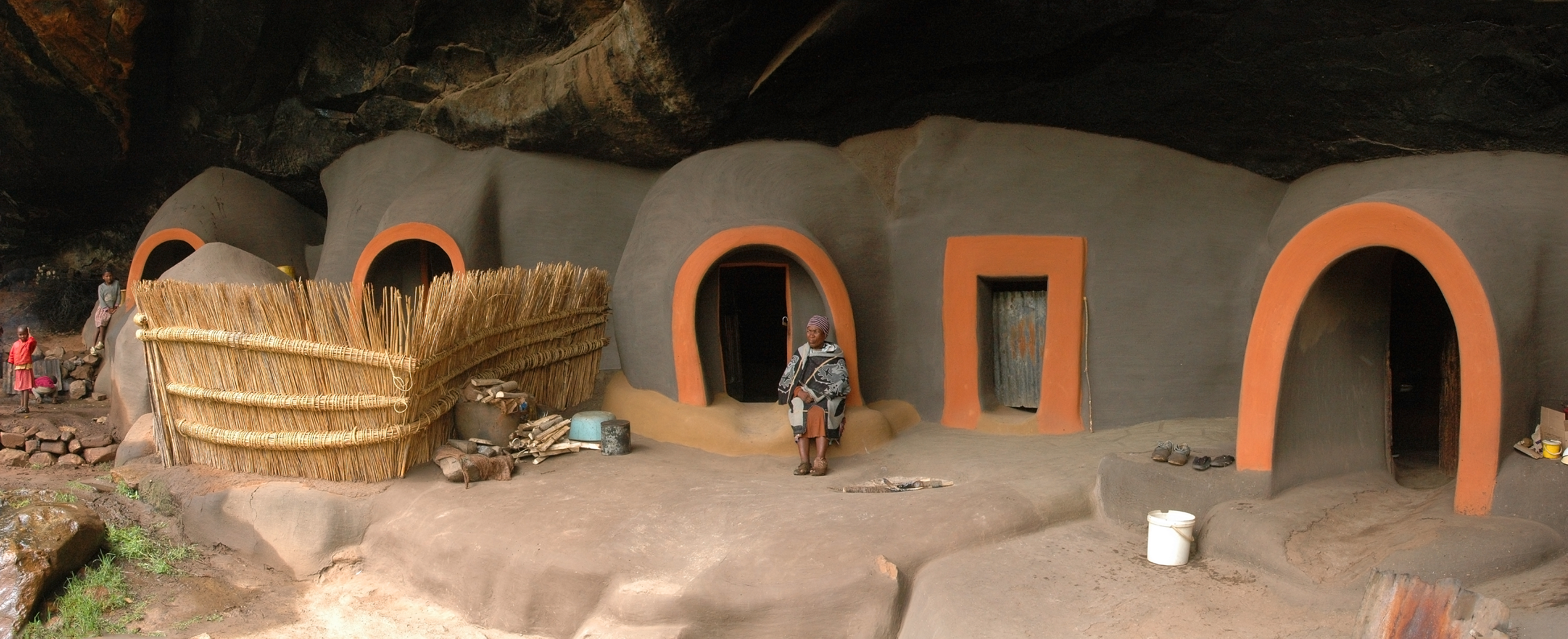
The Kome Cave Dwellings

The Kome Caves are a group of cave dwellings made out of mud in the district of Berea, Lesotho 25 km east of Teyateyaneng. The caves are still inhabited by descendants of the original people who settled the caves. The site has been classified as a National Heritage Site.

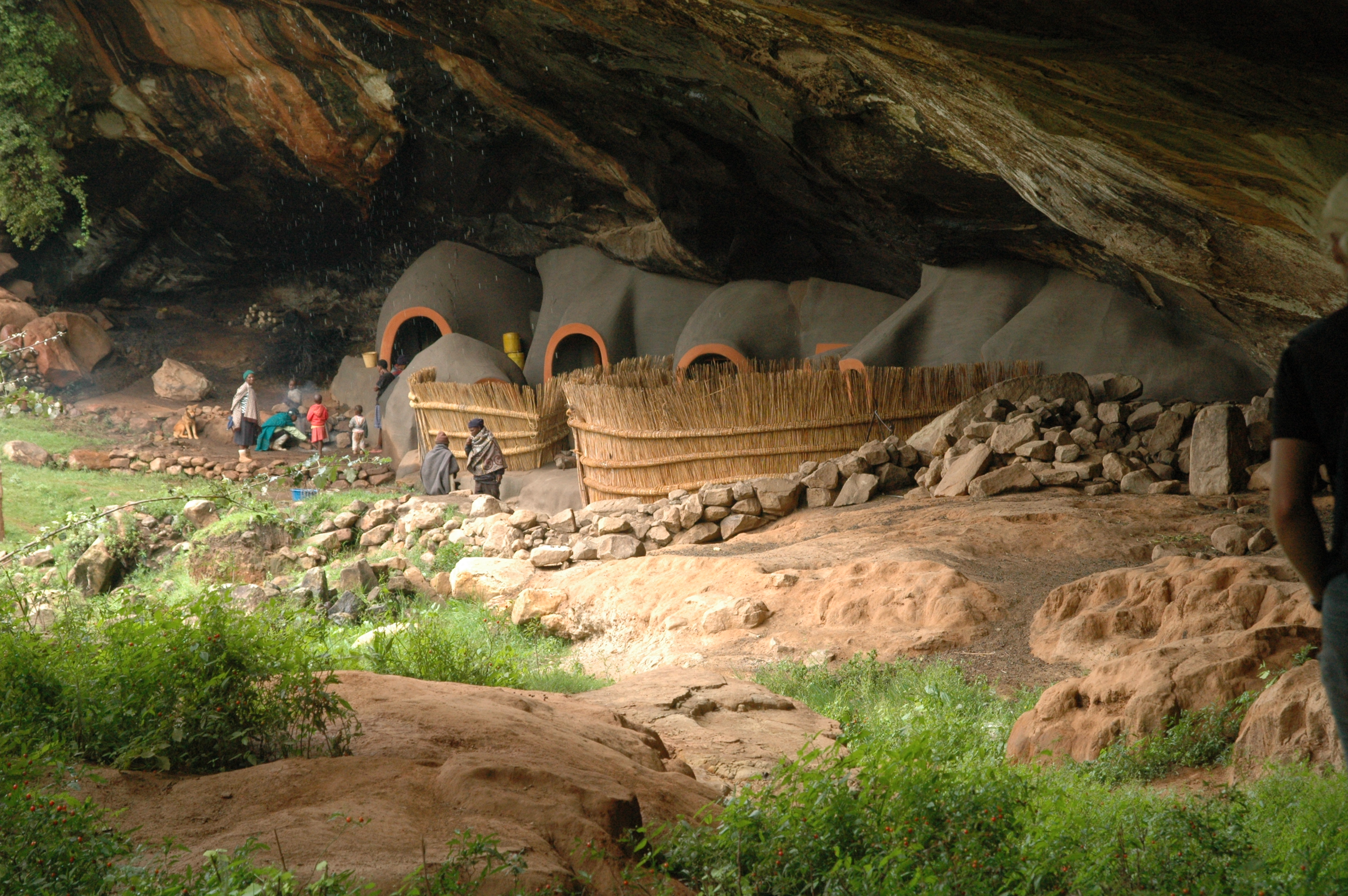
The Kome Cave Dwellings

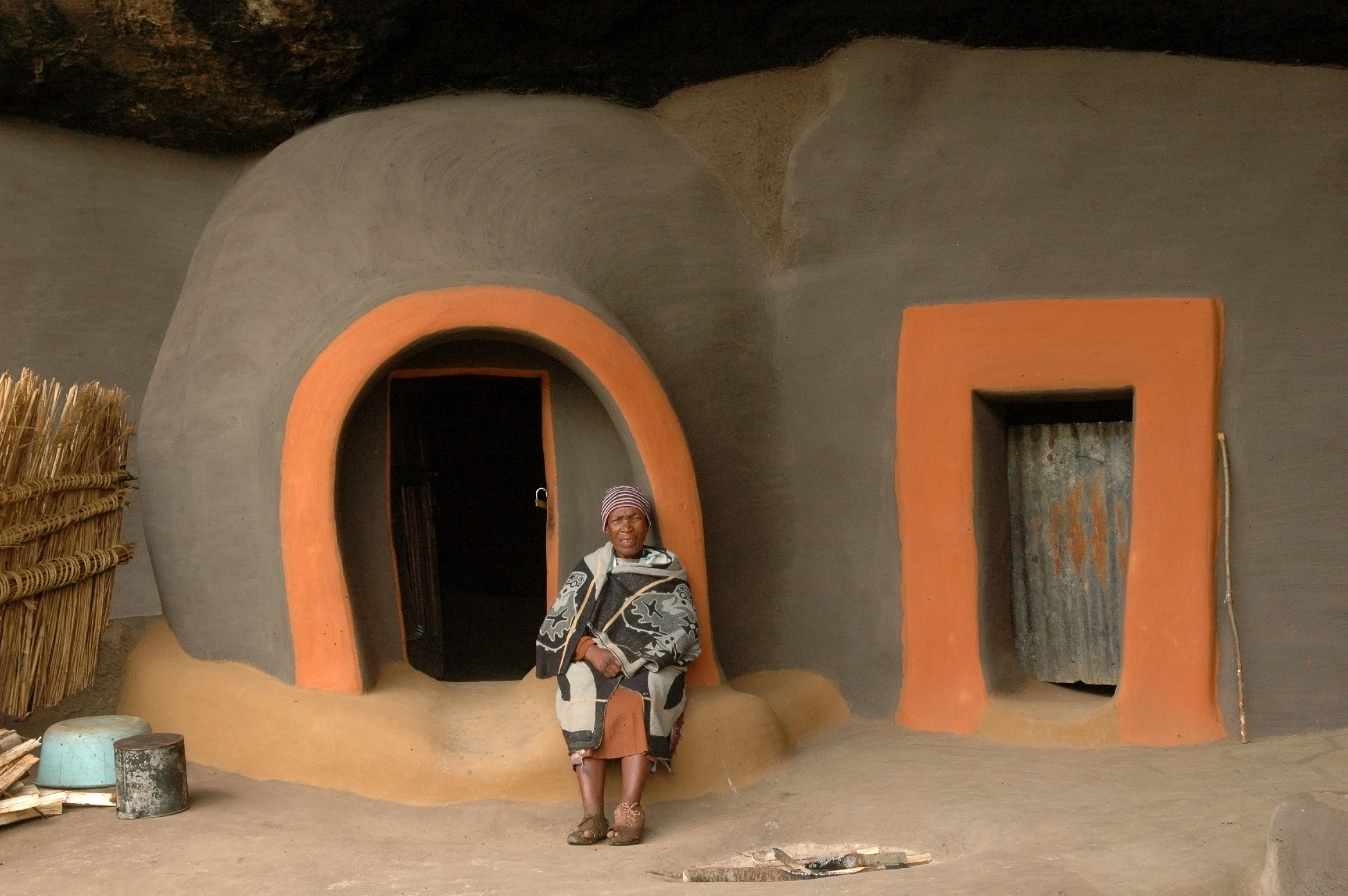
A woman sitting in front of the caves

== History ==
The Kome Cave Dwellings were built and protected by Chief Teleka of The Basia (cat) Clan in the early 19th century. The main purpose for the cave dwellings was to serve as a hideout from adversaries during the drought in the late 18th century. The name of Ha Kome comes from the Kome family in the Basia tribe, the first inhabitants of the cave.

== Location ==
The Kome Cave Dwellings are located in the Berea District about half an hour's drive from Teyateyaneng, the capital of the Berea District, and an hours drive from Maseru, the capital of the Maseru District and Lesotho. The geographical coordinates are S 29° 14′ 38.2 E 027° 52′ 00.2. It is 21 km from Blue Mountain Inn, a three star hotel in Teyateyaneng.
