= Mabote =

Mabote Vietnam
- Community Council / Constituency
- Nickname: KTA
- Geographic Center of Community
- Coordinates: 29°16′43″S 27°31′27″E
- Country: Lesotho
- District: Berea District
- Constituency: Mabote
- Elevation: 4,816 ft (1,468 m)

Population (2006)
  - Total: 38,047
- Time zone: UTC+2 (CAT)
- Coordinates computed from Lesotho Villages file.

Mabote is a community council in the Maseru Municipality located in the Berea District of Lesotho. The population in 2006 was 38,047.

Marathoner Tsepo Mathibelle is a native of Mabote.

Although (ha)Mabote is located towards the west, the districts of Berea are highly territorial and divide themselves mainly the West side, naleli (NI) and qualabata (QlA)and the East side, khubetsoana (KTA)

== Villages ==
The community of Mabote includes the villages of:

Bochabela I (Khubetsoana)
Bochabela II (Khubetsoana)
Boinyatso
Ha Rankhala (Khubetsoana)
Ha Rasetimela (Naleli)
Khutsong (Naleli)
Kuruoane
Lecop (Khubetsoana)
Lifelekoaneng
Litupung (Maqalika)

Majara Section (Khubetsoana)
Mapeleng (Ha Mabote)
Maqalika
Masetlaokong (Khubetsoana)
Matebeleng (Khubetsoana)
Mookoli
Motlakaseng (Ha Mabote)
Ngoana-Oa-Lla (Khubetsoana)
Ntširele (Khubetsoana)
Phahameng (Ha Mabote)

Phahameng (Khubetsoana)
Phopholetsa (Ha Mabote)
Rural (Khubetsoana)
Sebaboleng
Sekamaneng
Sekoting (Khubetsoana)
Selakhapane
Taung (Ha Mabote)
Taung (Khubetsoana)
Thoteng (Ha Mabote)
