= Qoaling =

- Community Council / Constituency
- Geographic Center of Community
- Coordinates: 29°20′08″S 27°29′52″E
- Country: Lesotho
- District: Maseru District
- Elevation: 5,823 ft (1,775 m)

Population (2006)
  - Total: 33,989
- Time zone: UTC+2 (CAT)
- Coordinates computed from Lesotho Villages file.

Qoaling is a constituency and community council in the Maseru Municipality located in the Maseru District of Lesotho. The population in 2006 was 33,989.

== Villages ==
The community of Qoaling includes the villages of Bokhokhoaneng, Borokhoaneng, Botleng, Ha Besele (Qoaling), Ha Chala, Ha Jeke, Ha Keiso (Lithabaneng), Ha Letlatsa (Qoaling), Ha Nkhoahle (Qoaling), Ha Ramakhetheng, Ha Ramatsa, Ha Ratšoana, Ha Seoli, Ha Shelile, Ha Tikoe, Ha Tsautse, Ha Tšiame (Likotsi), Lefikeng (Lithabaneng), Lekhaloaneng, Linakotseng, Lower Seoli, Matšoareng, Matšoareng (Qoaling), Phomolong, Qoaling, Sealong (Ha Tikoe) and Tsoapo-Le-Bolila.
