= Lithoteng =

- Community Council / Constituency
- Geographic Center of Community
- Coordinates: 29°22′03″S 27°30′54″E
- Country: Lesotho
- District: Maseru District
- Elevation: 5,299 ft (1,615 m)

Population (2006)
  - Total: 26,593
- Time zone: UTC+2 (CAT)
- Coordinates computed via GeoNames.

Lithoteng is a constituency and community council in the Maseru Municipality located in the Maseru District of Lesotho. The population in 2006 was 26,593.

== Villages ==
The community of Lithoteng includes the villages of

Ha Keiso (Lithabaneng)
Ha Phakalasane
Ha Rampeoane
Ha Seleso
Ha Seoli
Khotsong (Lithoteng)
Lebung

Lebung (Ha Matala)
Lefikeng (Lithabaneng)
Lithabaneng
Lithoteng
Mahlabatheng (Lithabaneng)

'Mamenoaneng
Ntširele
Semphetenyane
Shalabeng
Shalabeng (Lithoteng)
