= Makhaleng =

- Constituency
- Geographic Center of Constituency
- Coordinates: 29°41′59″S 27°43′32″E
- Country: Lesotho
- District: Maseru District

Population (2006)
  - Total: 21,269
- Time zone: UTC+2 (CAT)
- Coordinates computed from Lesotho Villages file.

Makhaleng is a constituency located in the Maseru District of Lesotho. Its population in 2006 was 21,269.

== Community Councils ==
The constituency of Makhaleng includes the communities of:

- Makhalaneng
- Ribaneng
