= Makhalaneng =

- Community Council
- Geographic Center of Community
- Coordinates: 29°38′53″S 27°44′01″E
- Country: Lesotho
- District: Maseru District
- Constituency: Makhaleng
- Elevation: 5,902 ft (1,799 m)

Population (2006)
  - Total: 13,146
- Time zone: UTC+2 (CAT)
- Coordinates computed from Lesotho Villages file.

Makhalaneng is a community council located in the Maseru District of Lesotho. The population in 2006 was 13,146.

== Villages ==
The community of Makhalaneng includes the villages of Aupolasi, Bochabela, Borata, Ha Abele, Ha Chake, Ha Chere (Koung), Ha Dinizulu, Ha Fane, Ha Fokoane, Ha Joele, Ha Kali, Ha Kelebone, Ha Kori, Ha Kou (Maliphokoana), Ha Lefeko, Ha Leholi, Ha Lejaha, Ha Lekota, Ha Lekunutu, Ha Lesooana, Ha Letsema, Ha Lithathane, Ha Makhema, Ha Makoae, Ha Maloma, Ha Mammenyana, Ha Maphephe, Ha Maphoma, Ha Masakale, Ha Maseru (Aupolasi), Ha Matšaba, Ha Matšoana, Ha Metsing, Ha Mohale-a-Phala, Ha Moitšupeli, Ha Mojakane, Ha Mojakopo, Ha Mokheseng, Ha Mokhou, Ha Mokola, Ha Molahloe, Ha Moora, Ha Moshe, Ha Motale, Ha Mothibeli, Ha Motjotji, Ha Motlelepe, Ha Motsoafa, Ha Nako, Ha Nkabane, Ha Ntima, Ha Pelei, Ha Phathang, Ha Pholo, Ha Potiane, Ha Raboletsi, Ha Rakhati, Ha Raleqheka, Ha Ramosoeu, Ha Raqoane, Ha Sematle, Ha Seoloana, Ha Serabele, Ha Shoaepane, Ha Talasi, Ha Tlali, Ha Tlapana, Ha Toki (Moqoakong), Ha Tšehla, Ha Tsuu, Kena (Ha Matheatlala), Kena (Ha Mothibeli), Kena (Ha Tsola), Koqong, Koung, Likhoaleng, Liphakoeng, Lithabaneng, Maama, Maholong, Mantša-tlala, Matsoapong, Motlejoa, Motse-Mocha (Ha Lekunutu), Rabolinyane, Sekukurung, Terae, Thaba-Chitja and Tholang.
