= Motimposo =

- Community Council / Constituency
- Geographic Center of Community
- Coordinates: 29°18′48″S 27°31′17″E
- Country: Lesotho
- District: Maseru District
- Elevation: 5,135 ft (1,565 m)

Population (2006)
  - Total: 24,714
- Time zone: UTC+2 (CAT)
- Coordinates computed from Lesotho Villages file.

Motimposo is a constituency and community council in the Maseru Municipality located in the Maseru District of Lesotho. The population in 2006 was 24,714.

== Villages ==
The community of Motimposo includes the villages of Ha Tšiu, Ha Tšosane, Letsatseng (Ha Tšosane), Majoe-a-Litšoene, Mosikong (Tšenola), Motimposo, Motse-Mocha and Tšenola.

== Government ==
The Lesotho Congress for Democracy (LCD) Member of Parliament for Motimposo Constituency No. 30, Mr. Ramatla ‘Makong was sworn in by the Deputy Speaker of the National Assembly, Sephiri Motanyane, on May 6, 2004. Mr. ‘Makong's election follows the death of the incumbent, the late Mr. Ts’eliso Mohloki, who died in a car accident in 2003 with his wife.
