= Stadium Area =

- Community Council / Constituency
- Geographic Center of Community
- Coordinates: 29°18′40″S 27°30′00″E
- Country: Lesotho
- District: Maseru District
- Elevation: 5,141 ft (1,567 m)

Population (2006)
  - Total: 21,906
- Time zone: UTC+2 (CAT)
- Coordinates computed from Lesotho Villages file.

Stadium Area is a constituency and community council within the Maseru Municipality, in the Maseru District of Lesotho. The population in 2006 was 21,906.

== Villages ==
The community of Stadium Area includes the villages of Aupolasi (Lower Thamae), Cathedral Area, Emmanuel Hostel, Fokothi, Lesotho High School, Lower Thamae, 'Mabathoana High School, Maseru East, Mohalalitoe, Moshoeshoe II, NTTC, Ntširele (Lower Thamae), Save The Children, Sea-Point, Stadium Area, Temong, Thabong, Thibella and Upper Thamae.

== Setsoto Stadium ==
Setsoto Stadium has a capacity of between 20,000 and 25,000 and accommodates various sporting activities such as soccer, track and field events including offices for several sporting associations.
