= Tšolo Thakeli =

Mosotho human rights activist

Tšolo Tjeka-Tjeka Thakeli
- Born: Tšolo Thakeli; 6 December 1991 (age 34); Teyateyaneng, Lesotho
- Other name: Tjeka-Tjeka
- Citizenship: Mosotho
- Education: National University of Lesotho (LLB)
- Alma mater: National University of Lesotho
- Occupations: Human rights activist, lawyer, businessman
- Known for: Youth unemployment activism, "#HelpMeFindWork"
- Children: 2

Tšolo "Tjeka-Tjeka" Thakeli (born 6 December 1991) is a Mosotho human rights activist, lawyer and entrepreneur.

== Biography ==
Thakeli qualified as a lawyer after graduating with a LLB in 2015. He stated he had struggled to find employment after finishing his studies, and worked as a garage attendant in Teyateyaneng.

Thakeli is a long-term campaigner on the issue of youth unemployment in Lesotho. In 2016, he staged a one-man protest outside the Parliament of Lesotho in Maseru to raise attention to the issue during the tenure of then-Prime Minister, Pakalitha Mosisili. Thakeli also started the social media campaign "#HelpMeFindWork" to raise awareness of youth unemployment among government authorities and non-governmental organisations.

On 13 June 2025, Thakeli posted a video online in which he complained about Lesotho's unemployment rate and criticised Sam Matekane, the Prime Minister, for not delivering on a campaign promise to create 70, 000 new jobs despite being three years into his tenure. Thakeli queried why there was no provision for job creation in the government's February budget. In the video, Thakeli also commented on alleged corruption within the Lesotho Electricity Company.

The following day, Thakeli's home in Teyateyaneng, Berea District, was stormed by police, and he was arrested without warrant. He was initially charged with insulting Matekane and inciting violence, but the charges were dropped due to there being insufficient evidence. After being released, Thakeli was arrested later that same day on a new charge of sedition. He was detained for two days before being released; during that time, Thakeli alleged that he had been told by the head of the Lesotho Mounted Police Service to not mention Matekane's name publicly again.

Thakeli's arrest triggered protests in Lesotho's capital, Maseru. He was presented in court at Berea Magistrates' Court in Teyateyaneng on 4 July on charges of inciting public violence and disturbing the peace.

Action for Southern Africa described the response to Thakeli's video as "terrifying", noting that Thakeli had not called for Matekane's resignation but was "just asking [a] question", noting that freedom of expression was protected by the constitution of Lesotho. The national newspaper The Post stated that Thakeli had acted within his constitutionally and internationally recognised rights to criticise government officials.
