= Lithabaneng =

- Community Council / Constituency
- Likotsi Mountain seen from Ha Matala

- Geographic Center of Community
- Coordinates: 29°21′58″S 27°32′17″E
- Country: Lesotho
- District: Maseru District
- Elevation: 5,771 ft (1,759 m)

Population (2006)
  - Total: 28,371
- Time zone: UTC+2 (CAT)
- Coordinates computed from Lesotho Villages file.

Lithabaneng is a constituency and community council in the Maseru Municipality located in the Maseru District of Lesotho. The population in 2006 was 28,371.

== Villages ==
The community of Lithabaneng includes the villages of Borokhoaneng, Botšabelo, Ha Keiso (Lithabaneng), Ha Khechane, Ha Leqele, Ha Matala, Ha Nelese, Lefikeng (Lithabaneng), Lepereng, Lithabaneng, Makoanyane, Matala Phase II, Mathokoane, Sekoting, Sekoting (Ha Leqele) and Upper Thamae.

== Education and Health Care ==
The SOS Children's Village Maseru situated in Lithabaneng contains a kindergarten with a capacity of 125 children, a primary school with a capacity of 490 children, family housing, social centre, youth facility and a medical centre that can provide medical treatment to up to 1,000 patients per month.
