= Tebe-Tebe =

- Community Council
- Geographic Center of Community
- Coordinates: 29°12′52″S 27°54′49″E
- Country: Lesotho
- District: Berea District
- Elevation: 6,152 ft (1,875 m)

Population (2006)
  - Total: 16,533
- Time zone: UTC+2 (CAT)
- Coordinates computed from Lesotho Villages file.

Tebe-Tebe is a community council located in the Berea District of Lesotho. Its population in 2006 was 16,533.

== Villages ==
The community of Tebe-Tebe includes the villages of Ha 'Matanki, Ha 'Neko, Ha Boimamelo, Ha Jane, Ha Johane, Ha Lefoleri, Ha Lejone, Ha Lenkoane, Ha Leponesa, Ha Lereko, Ha Lethokonyane, Ha Leutsoa, Ha Macheche, Ha Majoro, Ha Makhatseane, Ha Makhula, Ha Malefetsane (Ha Ntlama), Ha Mapeshoane (Malimong), Ha Matjotjo, Ha Matsipe, Ha Mika, Ha Mohatlane, Ha Moholobela, Ha Mokhameleli, Ha Mokhethi, Ha Mokolanyane, Ha Molahli, Ha Mona, Ha Monethi, Ha Moorosane, Ha Morake, Ha Naleli, Ha Nkhahle, Ha Ntlama, Ha Ntsekhe, Ha Pii, Ha Pitso, Ha Ramaema, Ha Ramapaeane, Ha Ramaqele, Ha Ramosenyehi, Ha Selei, Ha Sello, Ha Tello, Ha Tsai, Ha Tsikoane, Ha Tsikoane Phalole, Ha Tsimatsi, Liolong, Lipohong, Litooaneng, and Masuoeng.
