= Wawel Chakra =

Place on Wawel Hill, Kraków, Poland

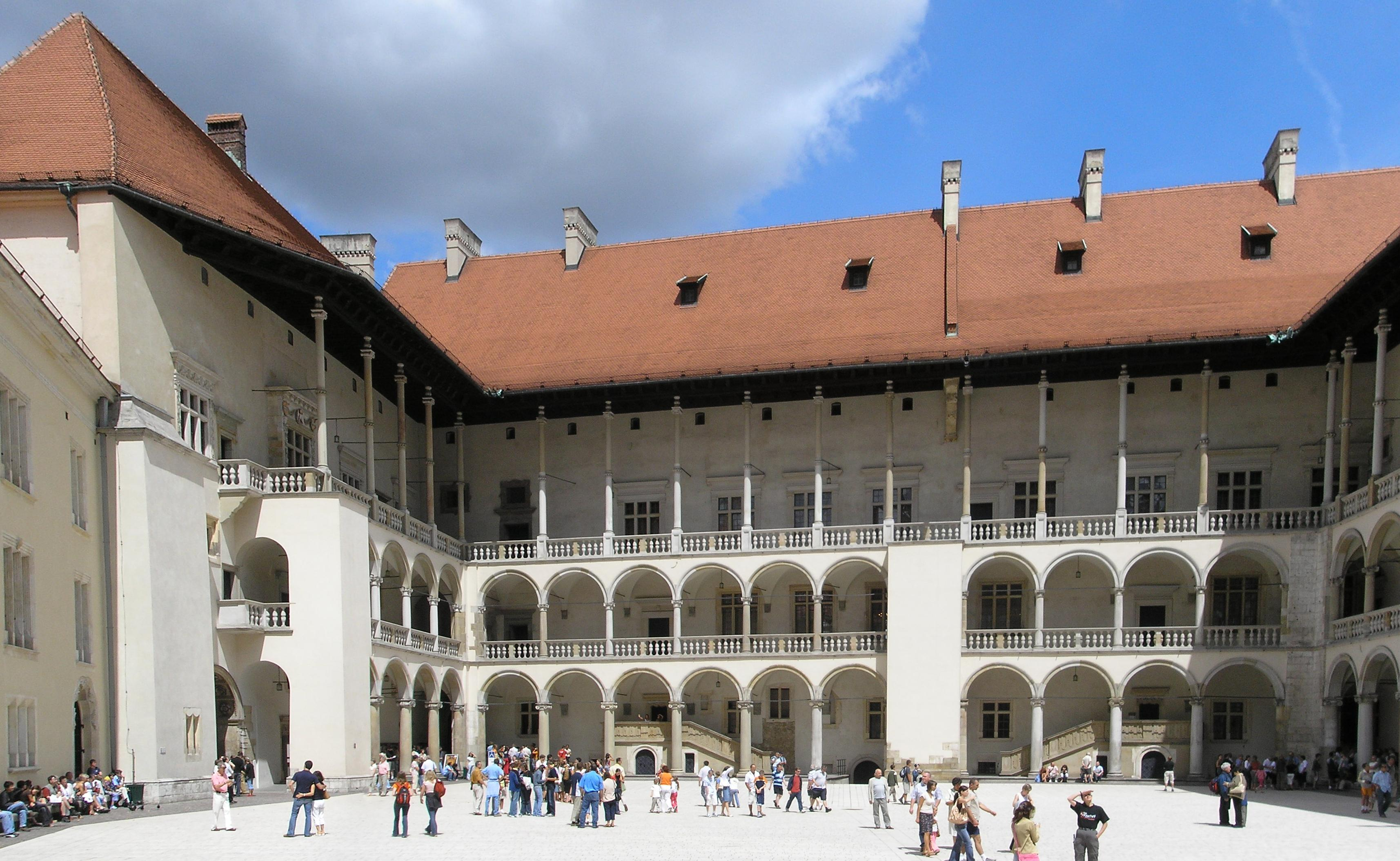
Renaissance courtyard of Wawel Castle. The Chakra - near left corner.

The Wawel Chakra (Polish: czakram wawelski) is a place on Wawel hill in Kraków in Poland which is believed to emanate powerful spiritual energy. Adherents believe it to be one of the world's main centers of spiritual energy. The Wawel Chakra is said to be one of a few select places of immense power on Earth, which, like a chakra point in the human body, allegedly functions as part of an (esoteric) energetic system within Earth.

According to believers, the center of the Wawel Chakra is situated under St. Gereon's chapel, which was built in the 11th century and is located between the Royal Castle and the Wawel Cathedral - in the north-west corner of Wawel's courtyard.

The Wawel Chakra, or Wawel Stone, or Wawel Lotus or Wawel Power Place is treated as:

- a theosophical belief from 1930s (with legendary threads)
- a contemporary legend (so called urban legend) from the 1980s (but with roots in 1930s)
- a place of great interest and a research subject (and speculated topic) of contemporary dowsers and geomants
- a place of powerful spiritual and healing energy for New Agers
- a nuisance for people of firm Catholic or scientific background
- a tourist attraction, not welcomed by church and museum authorities

== Wawel Chakra as an urban legend ==
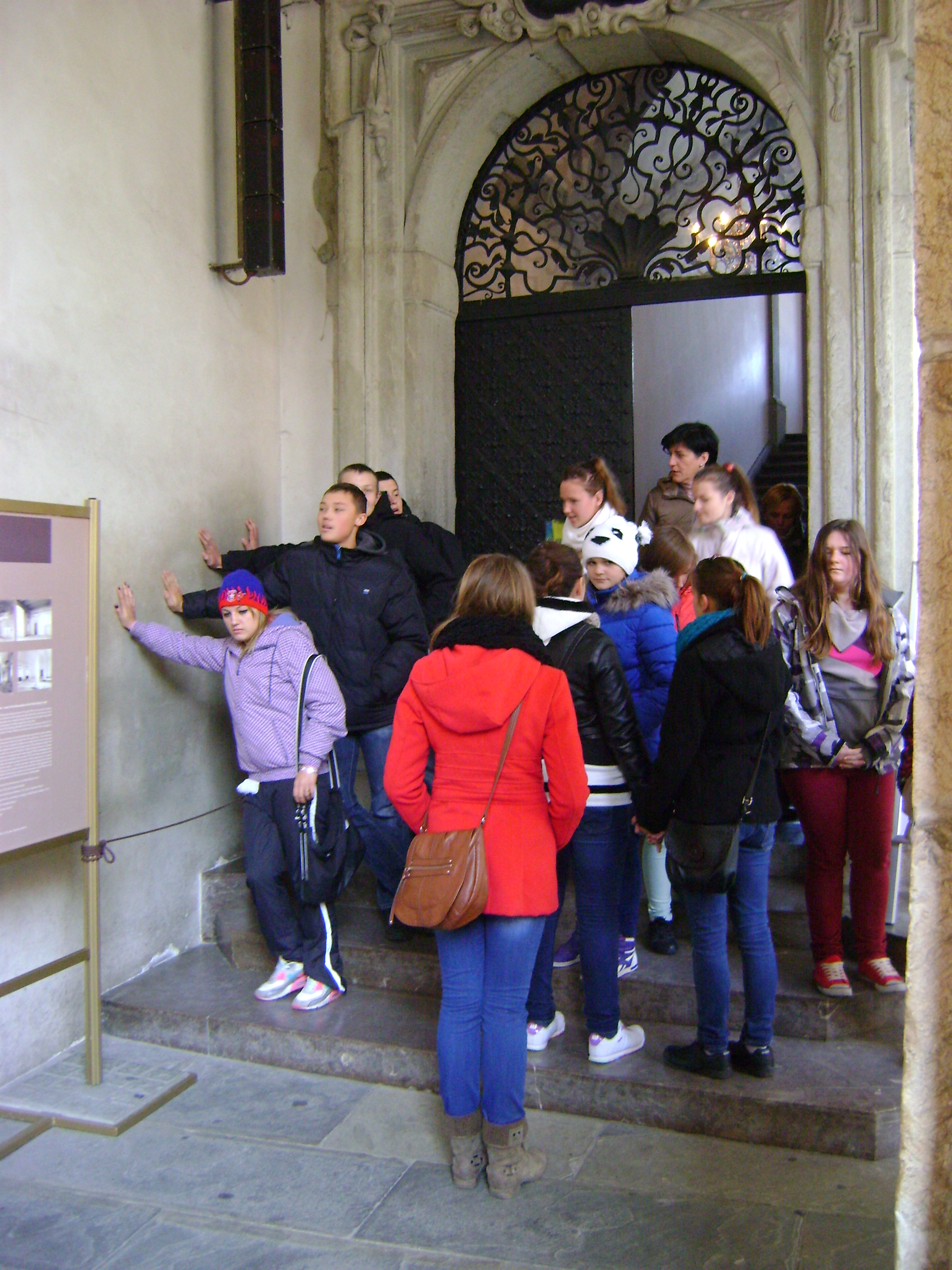

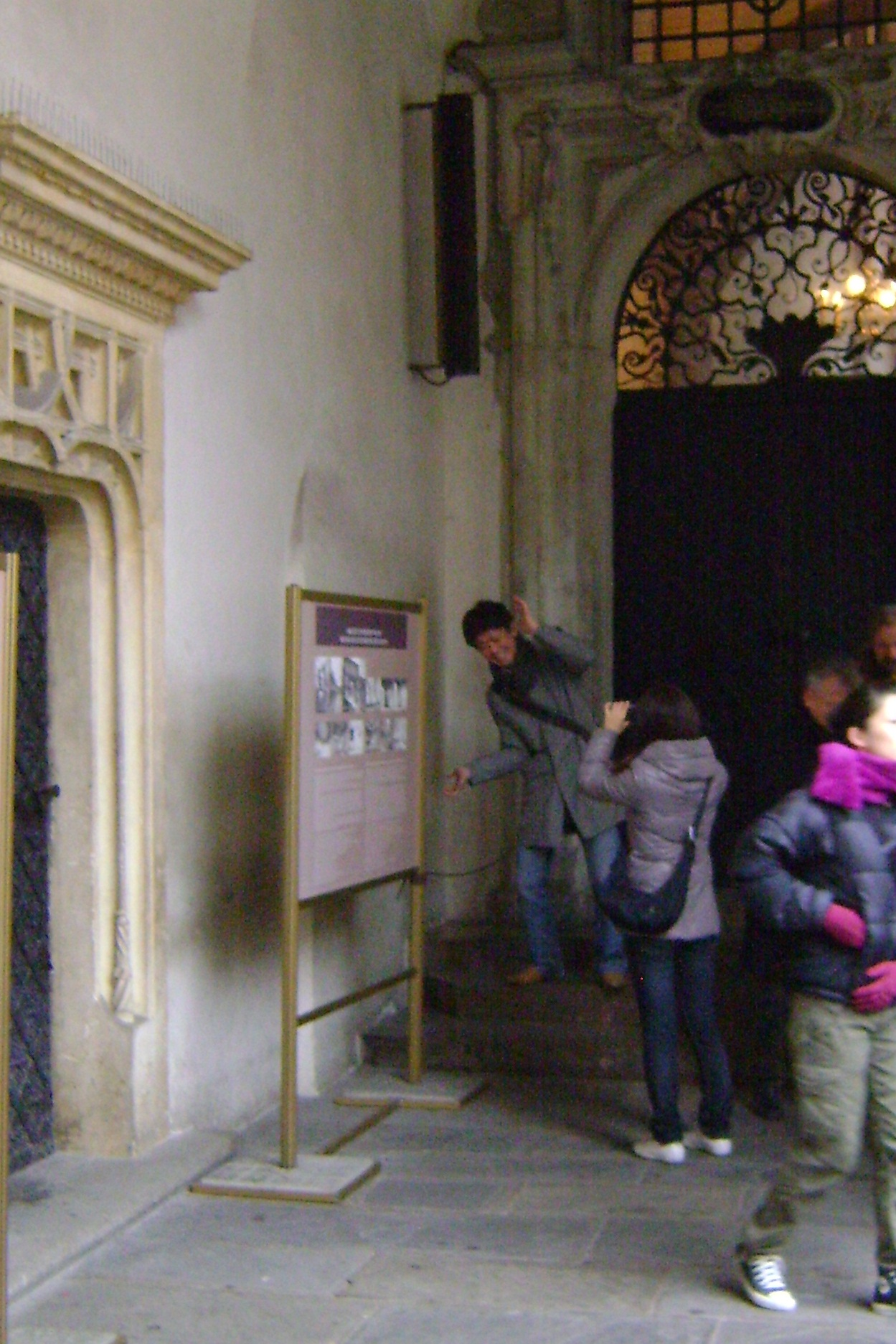

One of Wawel's most well-known, but officially unendorsed legends is that of the fabled chakra stone. The chakra stone is believed to be a holy stone, protecting the hill upon which Wawel was built, and thus protecting the whole city of Kraków as well. It is one of seven mysterious energy sources located in different places around the world - these sources are also regarded as the seven main energy centres of Earth.

There is an assumption that the Earth has seven special places quite like ‘force centers’ of the human body called chakras in the tantric and yogic teachings of Hinduism. Kraków, and specifically the Wawel hill, is supposed to be one of those force centers or 'holy areas'. Additionally, Rome, Jerusalem, and Delhi are usually awarded the same status, however, there has been no consensus giving them official status. An internet search yields about 40 locations claiming to be one of the seven chakras of Earth.

The origins of the tale have been traced to a newspaper story published in the mid-1930s. It reported that two mysterious gentlemen from India visited the Wawel Castle and were overly interested in an empty corner of the courtyard, which prompted guesswork. The story resurfaced in the 1980s. Soon, the Wawel Chakra would become famous in Kraków and in Poland as a whole, its legend fanned by New Age enthusiasts. In the 21st century, it began to wane. Recently, authorities such as the Wawel museum management as well as Catholic Church have engaged in battling the chakram fallacy which may breathe new life into it.

== Wawel Chakra as Theosophical occult center ==
According to European theosophical tradition, there are seven chakras of Earth, the other six being located in New Delhi, Mekka, Delphi, Rome, Velehrad. In Hindu tradition, there are also chakras in Benares, Hardwar, Rishikesh, Allahabad.

According to a legend, Greek philosopher, mystic, and explorer, Apollonius of Tyana, discovered a hill during one of his long-term voyages, now called Wawel, which emitted great, positive radiation. He left there one of his talismans to reveal the full potential of chakra radiation.

Wanda Dynowska, a Polish theosophist and translator, linked Wawel with an old Hindu legend. The legend tells that God Shiva threw seven stones in seven directions towards Earth, as a gift to the people, spawning seven places that emit the god's powerful energy.

Annie Besant and Charles Leadbeater visited Wawel, stating that they felt a powerful spiritual energy. George Arundale wrote in 1932 about the powerful magnetic aura of Wawel.

Polish theosophist, Kazimierz Chodkiewicz wrote a book The Cracow Occult Centre.

== New Agers and the Wawel Chakra ==
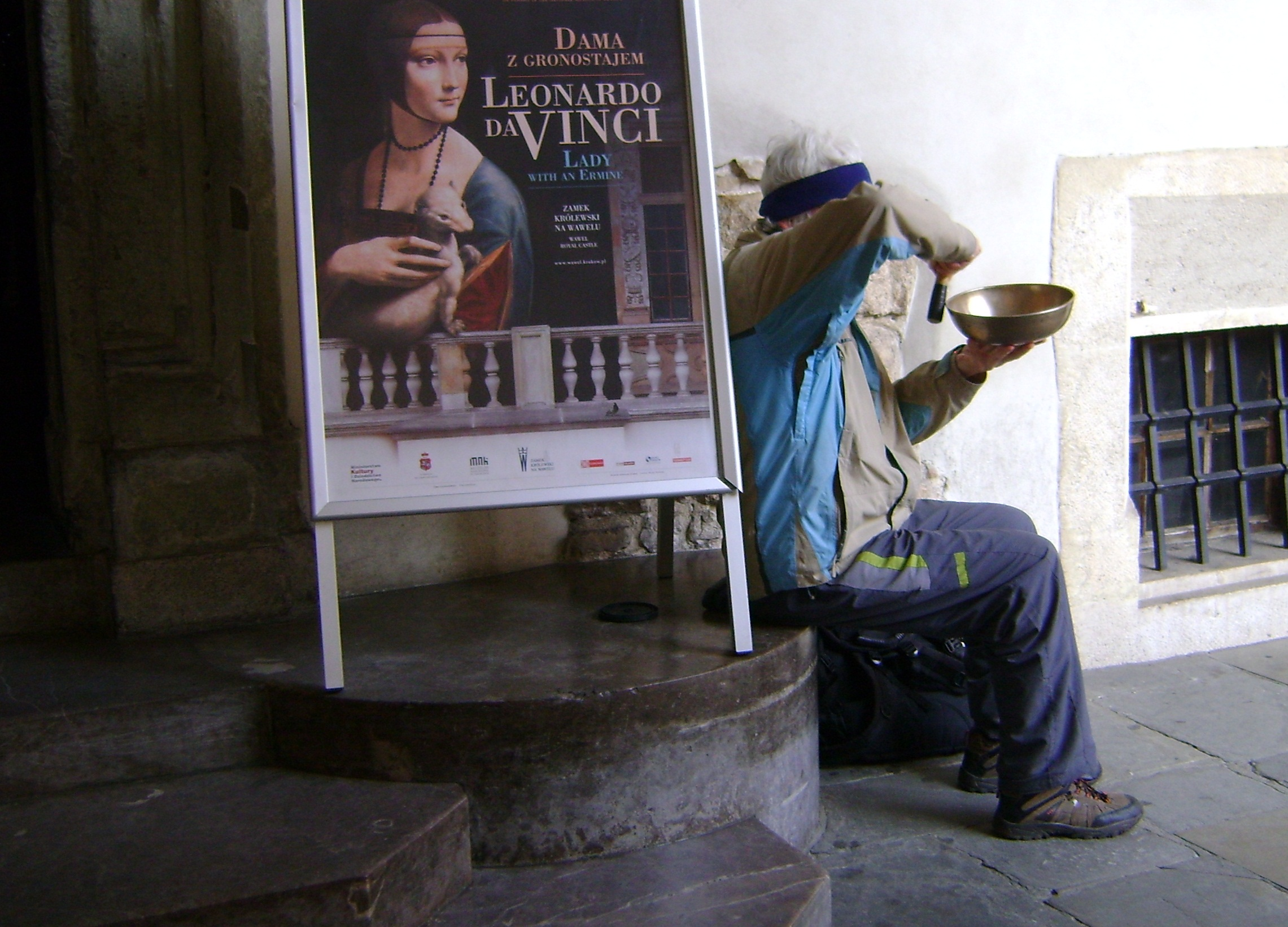

Although St. Gereon's chapel is not open to the public, single people engrossed in meditation can still be found - all year around, standing or sitting near the north-west corner of Wawel's courtyard. Believers may also touch a chapel wall with their heads, backs, hands or heels – this is the wall which screens St. Gereon's chapel from the eyes of the public.

It became customary for people who believe in the power of the chakra to come here and lean against the wall for a few minutes in order to recharge their spiritual batteries.

== Researches and speculations of geomants and dowsers ==
According to geomants, dowsers and psychics, there is no doubt about the powerful, positive energy radiating out of the place called Czakram Wawelski.

There is no consensus on the existence of the stone, however. The stone may be either a legend, a metaphor, a metaphorical source of positive terrestrial radiation or source of spiritual forces, or an actual amulet inside the walls.

According to Polish geomant and dowser Leszek Matela, there is unusual radiation there, both cosmic and terrestrial, emanated by subterranean water veins ascending towards the chapel. The water veins are to flow deeply underground in the bedrock, lifting up beneath the chapel. Consequently, the annular radiation occurs. The radiation is supposed to be beneficial to human beings, unlike the radiation of usual water veins.

The power of Cracow Chakra's stone geomantic energy has been estimated by Matela to be 120.000 points on BSM scale (Bovis-Simenoton-Matela) – for comparison, radiation of a healthy human body would be just 6500 points.

== Wawel Chakra as an unwanted tourist attraction ==
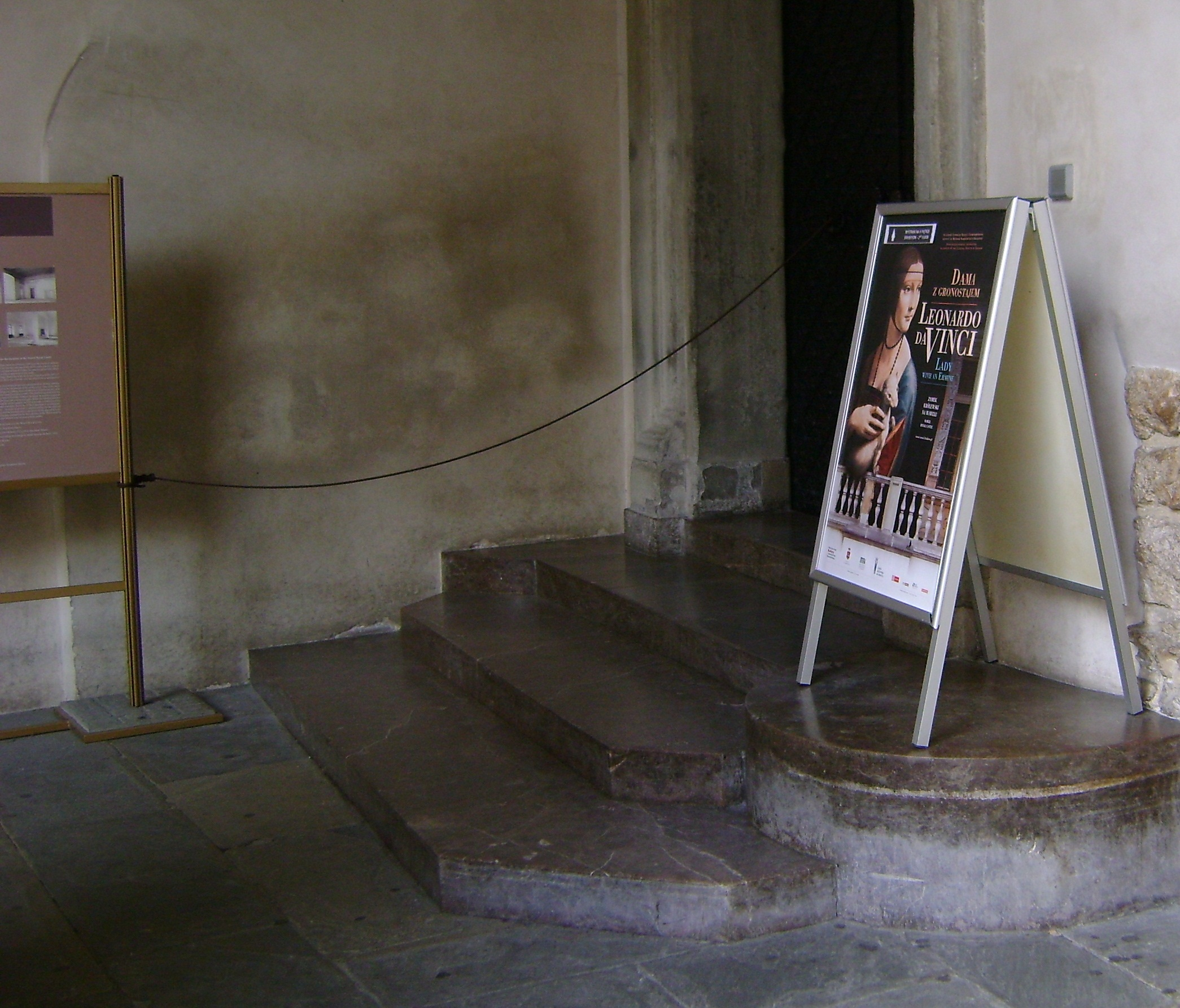

The specific location of the alleged positive energy is not open to the public in spite of the archaeological excavation there having been completed.

When the chakra area was roped off in 2001, the conservationists' desire to protect the wall from the public was explained as the main reason for this.

== Sources ==
- Matela, Leszek (2006). Tajemnice czakramu wawelskiego i sekrety Krakowa (Secrets of the Wawel Chakra and Mysteries of Cracow). Białystok. ISBN 83-7377-113-1
- Święch, Zbigniew (2005). Czakram wawelski. Największa tajemnica wzgórza (The Wawel Chakra. The Biggest Secret of the Hill). Kraków. ISBN 83-85347-12-7
- Rożek, Michał (1991). Kraków, czyli siódmy czakram ziemi. O tajemniczych osobliwościach tego miasta (Kraków, or the Seventh Chakra of the Earth. About Mysterious Peculiarities of the Town). Kraków. ISBN 8385104-13-5
- Chodkiewicz, Kazimierz (1966). The Cracow Occult Center. London. "The most important 20th century voice on the extraordinary powers of Wawel"
  - Italian edition: Il centro occulto di Cracovia, Torino 1975
  - Polish edition: Kraków: ognisko sił tajemnych - duchowy ośrodek mocy, Kraków 1992 (reprinted in Święch Z. (2005), pp. 75–97)
