= Lilala =

- Community Council
- Geographic Center of Community
- Coordinates: 29°32′00″S 27°24′31″E
- Country: Lesotho
- District: Maseru District
- Elevation: 5,279 ft (1,609 m)

Population (2006)
  - Total: 24,195
- Time zone: UTC+2 (CAT)
- Coordinates computed from Lesotho Villages file.

Lilala is a community council located in the Maseru District of Lesotho. Its population in 2006 was 24,195.

== Villages ==
The community of Lilala includes the villages of

- Aupolasi
- Bolometsa (Ha Tšukulu)
- Ha Hlalele
- Ha Hlao
- Ha Khabisi
- Ha Khotšeng
- Ha Leboea
- Ha Lekhafola
- Ha Letsie (Tšoeneng)
- Ha Makae
- Ha Makhobotlela
- Ha Malelu
- Ha Mapholo
- Ha Mareka
- Ha Matabane
- Ha Moeti
- Ha Mohloai (Mokauli)
- Ha Mokhele
- Ha Molungoa
- Ha Morakanyane

- Ha Mosala
- Ha Mosamo
- Ha Mosoeunyane
- Ha Mosunkutu
- Ha Musi
- Ha Neo
- Ha Ntaote
- Ha Ntšohi
- Ha Osteng
- Ha Pelei
- Ha Phakoane
- Ha Pita
- Ha Rahlao
- Ha Ramaphiri
- Ha Ramatekane
- Ha Ramohapi
- Ha Ramokitimi
- Ha Rankhelepe
- Ha Rantulela

- Ha Raphae
- Ha Rasebonang
- Ha Rasekoai
- Ha Rasekoja
- Ha Ratau
- Ha Sankoe
- Ha Sekoati (Rikabe)
- Ha Sello
- Ha Sentšoantšo
- Ha Tamane
- Ha Thebesoa
- Ha Tholo (Matebeleng)
- Ha Tjamela
- Ha Tlali
- Ha Tlelase
- Ha Tlhakanelo
- Ha Tsautse
- Hlakoaneng
- Joala-Boholo (Tšoeneng)

- Lerakong
- Leralleng
- Letlapeng
- Libataolong
- Liqoabing
- Mahuu
- Malimong
- Masite (Ha Bereng)
- Masite's Nek
- Matateng
- Motse-Mocha
- Rothe
- Sekoting
- Taung
- Thabana-Tšooana(Mankholo)
- Thotaneng
- Topa
- Tšieng
