= Telle =

- Community Council
- Geographic Center of Community
- Coordinates: 29°50′13″S 28°07′54″E
- Country: Lesotho
- District: Maseru District
- Elevation: 7,490 ft (2,283 m)

Population (2006)
  - Total: 6,835
- Time zone: UTC+2 (CAT)
- Coordinates computed from Lesotho Villages file.

Telle is a community council in the Maseru District of Lesotho. Its population in 2006 was 6,835.

== Villages ==
The community of Telle includes the villages of Botsoela, Ha 'Malesia, Ha Elia, Ha Elia (Meeling), Ha Khahlana, Ha Khopolo (Lithabaneng), Ha Koloti, Ha Lechesa, Ha Leeba, Ha Lekola-Ntšo, Ha Leloko, Ha Machafela, Ha Makhele, Ha Mapitsi, Ha Mapoho, Ha Maqisha, Ha Mashenephe, Ha Masia, Ha Masienyane, Ha Monaheng, Ha Morainyane, Ha Motsu, Ha Ntsoku, Ha Nyali, Ha Pakiso, Ha Phaphaneso, Ha Popa, Ha Rakuba, Ha Ramafatsa, Ha Ramokhorong, Ha Ramosoeu, Ha Rampeo, Ha Rateele, Ha Salemone, Ha Samuel, Ha Sechache, Ha Seleke, Ha Setoi, Ha Talimo, Ha Telekoa, Ha Thiba-tsane, Ha Thotho, Ha Tieho, Ha Tlokotsi, Ha Tollo, Ha Tsekiso, Ha Tšoeu, Ha Tsoinyane, Khohlone, Khohlong (Makoabating), Khubetsoana, Konyana-Tšoana, Likotjaneng, Liphookoaneng, Litšoeneng, Matebeleng, Matsatseng, Mokotjana, Moreneng, Motlaputseng, Motse-Mocha, Nchela-Nchela, Pheselema, Polateng, Pontšeng, Sekhutlong, Sekoting, Tebeleng, Thabeng, Tholang, Thoteng, Tiping, Tša-Lebe and Tšutsulupa.
