= Mohlakeng, Lesotho =

Mohlakeng
- Community Council
- Thaba Chitja Mountain seen from A5 in Ha Lebamang

- Geographic Center of Community
- Coordinates: 29°30′51″S 27°38′40″E
- Country: Lesotho
- District: Maseru District
- Elevation: 6,170 ft (1,880 m)

Population (2006)
  - Total: 18,906
- Time zone: UTC+2 (CAT)
- Coordinates computed from Lesotho Villages file.

Mohlakeng is a community council located in the Maseru District of Lesotho. Its population in 2006 was 18,906.

== Villages ==
The community of Mohlakeng includes the villages of Aupolasi, Falatsa, Ha 'Mamahatisa, Ha Borane ('Malikhamane), Ha Chopho, Ha Foto, Ha Katu, Ha Khoeli, Ha Kobefu, Ha Lebakae, Ha Lebamang, Ha Lechesa, Ha Lekete, Ha Lekopa, Ha Lesoli, Ha Lihanela, Ha Liile, Ha Limo, Ha Luka, Ha Luka (Airport), Ha Mafisa, Ha Mahlelebe, Ha Mahlelebe (Hukung), Ha Mak'hoba, Ha Makhori, Ha Mapeshoane, Ha Maqhobela, Ha Matete (Qhuqhu), Ha Matsoake, Ha Mofoka, Ha Mohaka, Ha Mohlakaso, Ha Moholobela, Ha Mokoena, Ha Mokuoane, Ha Mosaeea, Ha Motente, Ha Mothetsi (Thoteng), Ha Mothibe, Ha Motlepu, Ha Mphoto, Ha Ngoatonyane, Ha Nkhabi, Ha Nko, Ha Nkoetla, Ha Phoheli, Ha Raboshabane, Ha Ralisene, Ha Ramohajane, Ha Ramokotjo, Ha Rampoetsi, Ha Rantšetse, Ha Rasebesoane, Ha Sefuli, Ha Setenane, Ha Setoaba, Ha Seturumane, Ha Takalimane, Ha Talinyana, Ha Taole, Ha Thabiso, Ha Thakali, Ha Tlebere, Ha Tšeana, Ha Tšiu, Koma-Koma, Maholong (Ha Mothetsi), Makoaeleng, Manganeng, Meru-Metšo, Mokunutlung, Molumong (Ha Mofoka), Mothating, Nkoeng, Patisanong, Qhomane (Ha Mofoka), Qhuqhu, Ramaqhanyane, Sekoting, Telle and Tholang.
