= Tsepo Mathibelle =

Lesotho long-distance runner

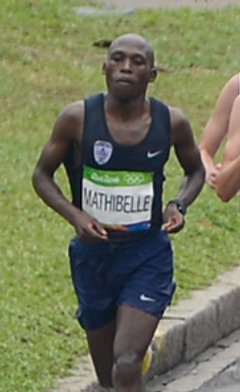
- Mathibelle at the 2016 Olympics

Personal information
- Born: June 30, 1991 (age 35) Mapeleng, Mabote, Lesotho
- Height: 171 cm (5 ft 7 in)
- Weight: 54 kg (119 lb)

Sport
- Country: Lesotho
- Sport: Athletics
- Event: Marathon

Achievements and titles
- Personal best: 2:13:50 (2017)

Tsepo Ramonene Mathibelle (born 30 June 1991) is a long-distance runner from Lesotho.

Mathibelle took up running aged 14. He ran his first marathon in 2012 and qualified for the 2012 Olympics. He ran his second marathon at the Olympics and finished last in a time of 2:55:54. After walking the majority of the last 3 km, Ramonene summoned the strength to jog over the finish line nearly 48 minutes behind the race winner. Shortly after the crowd cheered him to the finish line, he collapsed with exhaustion.

He went to the 2015 Marathon Championships in Beijing, leading the break at 30 km, and then fading to 14th, to finish in 2:17:17. He failed to finish the 2016 Olympic marathon.

He competed at the 2022 Commonwealth Games where he finished 17th in the marathon event.
