= Senekane =

- Community Council
- Geographic Center of Community
- Coordinates: 29°15′09″S 27°44′36″E
- Country: Lesotho
- District: Berea District
- Elevation: 6,050 ft (1,844 m)

Population (2006)
  - Total: 22,262
- Time zone: UTC+2 (CAT)
- Coordinates computed from Lesotho Villages file.

Senekane is a community council located in the Berea District of Lesotho. Its population in 2006 was 22,262.

== Villages ==
The community of Senekane includes the villages of:

- Ha Fako
- Ha Fako (Ha Sefikeng)
- Ha Fola
- Ha Hlapa
- Ha Hlasa
- Ha Hlekelele
- Ha Janki (Masaleng)
- Ha Keahana
- Ha Kete
- Ha Khabele
- Ha Khalane
- Ha Khohlooa
- Ha Khophola
- Ha Khothule
- Ha Kubere
- Ha Lapisi
- Ha Lebone
- Ha Letela
- Ha Letsipa
- Ha Likobo
- Ha Likotsi
- Ha Liphoto
- Ha Maboeane
- Ha Macheli
- Ha Mafatle
- Ha Makatane
- Ha Makhoebe
- Ha Makhomo
- Ha Malimabe
- Ha Mantai
- Ha Maqabane
- Ha Maritintši
- Ha Matholoana
- Ha Metsing
- Ha Mojela (Sefikeng)
- Ha Mokhehle
- Ha Mokuba
- Ha Molefi
- Ha Molibetsane
- Ha Molungoa
- Ha Monamoleli
- Ha Moratha
- Ha Moroke
- Ha Motolo
- Ha Motšoari
- Ha Mphele
- Ha Mpopo
- Ha Mpusi
- Ha Nchela
- Ha Nkhotho (Sefikeng)
- Ha Nkoebele
- Ha Nqetho
- Ha Ntabejane
- Ha Ntšoeu
- Ha Paape
- Ha Pampiri
- Ha Penya
- Ha Pholoanyane
- Ha Polaki
- Ha Popa
- Ha Rakotsoane
- Ha Ramabele
- Ha Ramahata
- Ha Ramaqopetsa
- Ha Ramatseatsana
- Ha Ramoloi
- Ha Ramontsuoe
- Ha Ramotšo
- Ha Ranthiba
- Ha Rantsane
- Ha Rantsoku
- Ha Rapholo
- Ha Rasunyane
- Ha Salemane
- Ha Saremone
- Ha Seboka
- Ha Sekepe
- Ha Sekete
- Ha Selemo
- Ha Selouoe
- Ha Senekane
- Ha Taaso
- Ha Tau
- Ha Thafeng
- Ha Thebe
- Ha Thotanyane
- Ha Tšitso
- Ha Tumo
- Konkotia
- Liphakoeng
- Litšilong
- Maqakaneng
- Matebeleng
- Matheneng
- Meholaneng
- Mothating
- Papalala
- Qhooeng
- Qhotseng
- Qopo (Ha Majara)
- Romeng
- Sekhalabateng
- Sekhutlong
- Tsitsa and Zenon
