= Makeoana =

- Community Council
- Geographic Center of Community
- Coordinates: 29°09′20″S 28°06′42″E
- Country: Lesotho
- District: Berea District
- Elevation: 5,430 ft (1,655 m)

Population (2006)
  - Total: 33,445
- Time zone: UTC+2 (CAT)
- Coordinates computed from Lesotho Villages file.

Makeoana is a community council located in the Berea District of Lesotho. Its population in 2006 was 33,445.

== Villages ==
The Makeoana community council includes the following villages:

- Bophephetsa
- Ha 'Makaliso
- Ha 'Malekhase
- Ha 'Mamatebele
- Ha 'Mapa
- Ha 'Molaoa
- Ha Bela-Besa
- Ha Boranta
- Ha Chabeli
- Ha Chakatsa
- Ha Chetane (Ha Tau)
- Ha Jobo
- Ha Khamothi
- Ha Khoarai
- Ha Khopo
- Ha Kutsupa
- Ha Lebese
- Ha Lebona
- Ha Lejaha
- Ha Lesibe
- Ha Letsie
- Ha Lieta
- Ha Mahana
- Ha Maime
- Ha Makhaola
- Ha Makoanyane
- Ha Makomo
- Ha Makopotsa
- Ha Malepa
- Ha Malibeng
- Ha Mangana
- Ha Mangoato
- Ha Maqotoane
- Ha Masopha (Meeling)
- Ha Matekane (Ha Kota)
- Ha Matsa
- Ha Matsoso
- Ha Mokoena
- Ha Molikuoa
- Ha Monyai
- Ha Mothakathi
- Ha Mothethi
- Ha Nkunyane
- Ha Nkutu (Sebetia)
- Ha Nkutunyane (Tloaalang)
- Ha Nonyana
- Ha Ntsane
- Ha Oetsi
- Ha Phatsoa
- Ha Pita
- Ha Posholi
- Ha Pulumo
- Ha Puoane
- Ha Raletsae
- Ha Ramohobo
- Ha Seana
- Ha Seme
- Ha Seraha-Majoe
- Ha Taaso
- Ha Thabo
- Ha Thebe (Sebetia)
- Ha Tobolela
- Khetha
- Khoakhoeng
- Khokhoba
- Lehlakaneng
- Lihlolong
- Liphakoeng
- Machalefose
- Mafikeng
- Mafotholeng
- Maholong
- Makh'anfolei
- Makhalong
- Makhanfolehi
- Maluba-Lube
- Mankoeng
- Maphatšoaneng
- Matangoaneng
- Matemeng
- Meeling
- Mokoallong
- Motse-Mocha (Qethane)
- Motsekuoa
- Nkhetheleng
- Phahameng
- Pokellong
- Qethane
- Sehlabeng
- Sekokoaneng
- Terai Hoek
- Thabana-Tšooana
- Tsipa and Vukazenzele
