= Ribaneng =

- Community Council
- Geographic Center of Community
- Coordinates: 29°45′20″S 27°43′08″E
- Country: Lesotho
- District: Maseru District
- Constituency: Makhaleng
- Elevation: 5,699 ft (1,737 m)

Population (2006)
  - Total: 7,509
- Time zone: UTC+2 (CAT)
- Coordinates computed from Lesotho Villages file.

Ribaneng is a community council located in the Mafeteng District of Lesotho. Its population in 2006 was 7,509.

== Villages ==
The community of Ribaneng includes the villages of

- Baehuku
- Boimamelo
- Boinyatso
- Ha Hlephe
- Ha Joele
- Ha Josefa
- Ha Koenyama
- Ha Lebona
- Ha Lengau
- Ha Mabejane
- Ha Mabela
- Ha Maketekete
- Ha Mashapha
- Ha Mokhotho
- Ha Mokoara
- Ha Mokotla
- Ha Molai
- Ha Molapisi
- Ha Molapo (CI)
- Ha Molisenyane
- Ha Moreoa
- Ha Moseli
- Ha Motanyane
- Ha Motlalehi
- Ha Motlatsi
- Ha Motseki
- Ha Motsoetla
- Ha Mpakoba (Manganeng)
- Ha Mphahama
- Ha Nkesi
- Ha Ntake
- Ha Ntšoeu
- Ha Pitso
- Pobeng
- Ha Qhoesha
- Ha Ramabanta
- Makhaleng
- Matelile
- Ha Richete (Ha 'Mantolo)
- Ha Masefata
- Moeaneng
- Ha Thaka-banna
- Kelepeng
- Ha Qhojoa
- Ha Ramoseeka
- Ha Rantšoetsa
- Ha Raphole
- Ha Sebinane
- Ha Seeiso (CII)
- Ha Seetsa
- Ha Sekonyela
- Ha Senyotlo
- Ha Tau*Ha Telu
- Ha Thebe
- Ha Tšehlo
- Hloahloeng
- Khohlong
- Kholokoe
- Khubetsoana
- Kubake
- Lekhalong
- Lilongoaneng
- Liphakoeng
- Mabeseng
- Machafela
- Maineng
- Makatseng
- Makhoakhoeng
- Manganeng
- Marakong
- Masaleng
- Matlapaneng
- Matlapaneng
- Mohlanapeng
- Mokotleng
- Moreneng
- Motse-Mocha
- Mpobong
- Niceville
- Paramenteng
- Polateng
- Rantsoelia
- Taung
- Thusong
- Tiping
