= Kueneng =

Community council in Lesotho

Koeneng
- Community Council
- Geographic Center of Community
- Coordinates: 29°00′58″S 27°59′53″E
- Country: Lesotho
- District: Berea District
- Elevation: 5,351 ft (1,631 m)

Population (2006)
  - Total: 21,887
- Time zone: UTC+2 (CAT)
- Coordinates computed from Lesotho Villages file.

Kueneng is a community council located in the Berea District of Lesotho. Its population in 2006 was 21,887.

== Education ==
St. Theresa's located in Bela-Bela was the first mission established in 1931. It began with a primary school and a clinic. It has now developed to a secondary high school known as Holy Names High School with 550 students, 55 of whom are boarders. All students take courses in English, Bible study, mathematics, science and Sesotho.

== Villages ==
The community of Kueneng includes the villages of

Bakaneng
Baking
Bela-Bela (Moreneng)
Bela-Bela West
Ha Mahlabachana (Bela-Bela)
Ha 'Makotola
Ha Hlajoane
Ha Khasane
Ha Khororo
Ha Kopi
Ha Lebentlele
Ha Lephallo
Ha Letsoela
Ha Leutsoa
Ha Makhetha
Ha Makotola
Ha Malibeng

Ha Masasa
Ha Mashetla
Ha Matooane
Ha Matsoai
Ha Mohale
Ha Monyatso
Ha Mora-Thaba
Ha Moratoe
Ha Matseketseke
Ha Moshoai
Ha Mpiti
Ha Nkhekhe
Ha Nkuebe
Ha Nteleki
Ha Ntisa
Ha Ntoro
Ha Pakalitha

Ha Peete
Ha Pelele (Lipeleseng)
Ha Pitso
Ha Qopana
Ha Rajone
Ha Ralekeke
Ha Raletsae
Ha Ratomo
Ha Seisa (Kolojane)
Ha Thuhloane
Ha Tlelaka
Ha Tšepo (Kolojane)
Ha Tsolo
Ha Khotsi
Likhutlong
Lilepeng (Kolojane)
Mafika-Lisiu (Masaleng)

Mafotholeng
Mafotholeng (Motse-Mocha)
'Malebesana (Ha Nyaka)
Maphiring
Masaleng (Lejoe-Motho)
Mechaling
Moeaneng (Bela-Bela)
Moetsuoa
Mokomahatsi
Moneaneng
Morapamiseng
Motse-Mocha
Paballong
Seatoma
Seforong
Thabana-Ntlenyana
Tuke
