= Kanana =

- Community Council
- Geographic Center of Community
- Coordinates: 29°11′35″S 27°37′40″E
- Country: Lesotho
- District: Berea District
- Elevation: 5,194 ft (1,583 m)

Population (2006)
  - Total: 19,311
- Time zone: UTC+2 (CAT)
- Coordinates computed from Lesotho Villages file.

Kanana is a community council located in the Berea District of Lesotho. Its population in 2006 was 19,311.

== Education ==
Ha Fusi Primary School is a church school, run by the Anglican Church of Lesotho. After teaching at the primary school in 2003, Andrew Uglow set about raising funds so that the church could open a secondary school. With land donated by the village chief, a three classroom school was built. Ha Fusi Secondary School was registered by the government of Lesotho in 2009.

== Villages ==
The community of Kanana includes the villages

Berea Mission
Ha 'Nepe
Ha Alanven
Ha Bolisi (Qalakheng)
Ha Buasono
Ha Fako
Ha Fusi
Ha Jubile
Ha Lehlohonolo
Ha Leluma
Ha Lenkathebe
Ha Lepamo
Ha Mabekenyane
Ha Makebe
Ha Makoanyane
Ha Makoatlane (Lekokoaneng)
Ha Makola
Ha Malofosa
Ha Maope
Ha Mapokotsa

Ha Marapo
Ha Mohoang
Ha Moketetsa
Ha Mokhele
Ha Mokhenene (Lekokoaneng)
Ha Mokhoele
Ha Mokhohlane (Lekokoaneng)
Ha Moloko (Lekokoaneng)
Ha Motsikoane
Ha Motšoene
Ha Mpiko
Ha Ntaja
Ha Rakoloi
Ha Ralinakanyane (Lekokoaneng)
Ha Ralisieng (Lekokoaneng)
Ha Ramoseeka
Ha Sakoane
Ha Sebolai
Ha Shadrack
Ha Sole

Ha Souru
Ha Tau
Letsatseng (Ha Majara)
Liboping
Linokong (Lekokoaneng)
Liphiring
Lithakong
Litšiling (Lekokoaneng)
Lovely Rock (Ha Majara)
Mafotholeng
Malumeng
Maqhaka
Matšeng
Matsitsing
Sekhutloaneng
Senyotong
Shano-Leholo (Lekokoaneng)
Thabana-Tšooana
Tsereoane (Sekolong)
Tsoili-Tsoili

== Water project ==
Construction of a water project due to start at Ha Makebe in Berea, will be coupled with the construction of 30,000 ventilated improved pit latrines for 250 villages countrywide. The project is intended to improve the supply of water for households, industries, business premises and the agricultural sector. Funding for the project is provided by the Millennium Challenge Account.

== Cultural references ==
Local poet Moleko Sebuwasngwe is critical of Kanana in his poem “God of Kanana is unhappy”.
