= Makheka =

- Community Council
- Geographic Center of Community
- Coordinates: 29°39′50″S 27°51′27″E
- Country: Lesotho
- District: Maseru District
- Elevation: 7,694 ft (2,345 m)

Population (2006)
  - Total: 5,473
- Time zone: UTC+2 (CAT)
- Coordinates computed from Lesotho Villages file.

Makheka is a community council located in the Maseru District of Lesotho. The population in 2006 was 5,473.

== Villages ==
The community of Makheka includes the villages of Foranteng, Ha 'Malebatsi, Ha Andreas, Ha Chadwick, Ha Chechane, Ha Elia, Ha Fochane, Ha John (Khorong), Ha Keleke, Ha Lerumonyane, Ha Mafonyoko, Ha Mahlomola, Ha Makubeletsane, Ha Malete, Ha Mankata, Ha Mantša, Ha Marai, Ha Mateu, Ha Molai, Ha Moleko, Ha Molomo, Ha Moseme, Ha Mphafolane, Ha Mphephe, Ha Ramokhobo, Ha Ramokone, Ha Ramosebo, Ha Sekantši, Ha Sekoati, Ha Setenane, Ha Setere, Ha Setofolo, Ha Tabo, Ha Taole, Ha Totlelase, Ha Tšepo, Ha Tsese, Ha Tsokotsa, Khohlong, Khubetsoana, Likhameng, Mamphokoane, Matsatsaneng, Matsatseng, Meritjaneng, Moeaneng, Phootle, Qhatseng, Serutle and Thoteng.
