= Makolopetsane =

- Community Council
- Geographic Center of Community
- Coordinates: 29°41′48″S 28°07′14″E
- Country: Lesotho
- District: Maseru District
- Elevation: 8,264 ft (2,519 m)

Population (2006)
  - Total: 7,415
- Time zone: UTC+2 (CAT)
- Coordinates computed from Lesotho Villages file.

Makolopetsane is a community council located in the Maseru District of Lesotho. Its population in 2006 was 7,415.

== Villages ==
The community of Makolopetsane includes the villages of:

- Aupolasi
- Boreipala
- Ha Abele
- Ha Hlabana
- Ha Hlabathe
- Ha Jeremia
- Ha Joele
- Ha John
- Ha Khomo
- Ha Kobeli
- Ha Kubeletsane
- Ha Labane
- Ha Labane (Lifateng)
- Ha Lebitsa
- Ha Lekhetho (Motenalapi)
- Ha Lekula
- Ha Libete
- Ha Litokelo
- Ha Mahlako
- Ha Makhele
- Ha Mankotseng
- Ha Matekoanyane
- Ha Mocheko
- Ha Mohapinyane
- Ha Mohloka
- Ha Molelle
- Ha Monakalali
- Ha Moroke
- Ha Motšoane
- Ha Mpeli
- Ha Nchemane
- Ha Ngoateng
- Ha Peiso
- Ha Ponto
- Ha Qamako
- Ha Rakibolane
- Ha Ralobisi
- Ha Ramahaheng
- Ha Sekhotsoa
- Ha Setipe
- Ha Tlhabi
- Ha Tšele
- Joala-Bobe
- Khalahali
- Khatleng
- Khilibiting
- Khubetsoana
- Lebohang
- Lehahaneng
- Lekhalong
- Letsatseng
- Liotsanyaneng
- Liphokoaneng
- Lithakong
- Lithubeng
- Mabeleteng
- Mainyatso
- Makhalong
- Makokong
- Malimong
- Malitsenyane
- Malumeng
- Mapatane
- Masaleng (Ha Taniele)
- Masianokeng
- Matebeleng
- Matsatseng
- Matsiring
- Mauteng
- Meeling
- Moeaneng (Ha Seng)
- Mokhoabong
- Mokoallong
- Motiaputseng
- Motse-Mocha (Ha Taniele)
- Mpatana
- Nkoeng
- Phatlalla
- Phororong
- Polateng
- Ramonaheng
- Sebala-Makhulo
- Sebusi
- Sekhutlong
- Sekokong
- Sethamahane
- Songoanyane
- Taung
- Terae Hoek
- Thabang
- Thibella
- Thotaneng
- Tiping
- Tlokoeng
