= Matsieng (disambiguation) =

Matsieng may refer to:

- A village in the Maseru District of Lesotho, where the royal residence is located
- Matsieng, Free State, a village in South Africa
- A site in Botswana, known for the Matsieng Footprints
- Matsieng, a musical group from Botswana
