= Ha Mots'eremeli =

Ha Mots'eremeli Muva
- Linear Settlement
- Location in Lesotho
- Coordinates: 29°08′17″S 27°43′24″E
- Country: Lesotho
- District: Berea District
- Elevation: 1,600 m (5,200 ft)

Population
  - Total: 165
- Time zone: GMT +2.00 (SAST)
- Area code: +266
- Vehicle registration: D

Ha Mots'eremeli is a small village north of Teyateyaneng, Lesotho. The hamlet is known for its football team, Melodi FC.
