= Phuthiatsana =

- Community Council
- Geographic Center of Community
- Coordinates: 29°07′31″S 27°52′48″E
- Country: Lesotho
- District: Berea District
- Elevation: 5,305 ft (1,617 m)

Population (2006)
  - Total: 25,660
- Time zone: UTC+2 (CAT)
- Coordinates computed from Lesotho Villages file.

Phuthiatsana is a community council located in the Berea District of Lesotho. Its population in 2006 was 25,660.

== Villages ==
Within Phuthiatsana, there are 85 villages including:

- Cana
- Ha Bose
- Ha Bulara
- Ha Chaba
- Ha Hlaonyane
- Ha Jane
- Ha Kholopane
- Ha Koone
- Ha Korotsoane
- Ha Kotita
- Ha Lebina
- Ha Lechesa
- Ha Lehana
- Ha Lenea
- Ha Lenea (Ha Mamathe)
- Ha Libenyane
- Ha Mahleke
- Ha Majara
- Ha Malesela
- Ha Mamathe
- Ha Matelile
- Ha Matseleli
- Ha Moepi
- Ha Mokhathi
- Ha Mokhehle
- Ha Mokhethi
- Ha Mokoma
- Ha Molala
- Ha Monnanyane
- Ha Morolong
- Ha Mosethe
- Ha Mosobela
- Ha Mosoeunyane
- Ha Motsoaole
- Ha Motsora
- Ha Mphetlane
- Ha Mphunyetsane
- Ha Ntebele
- Ha Ntsabane
- Ha Ntsang
- Ha Ntsenki
- Ha Patso
- Ha Phalatsane
- Ha Phiri
- Ha Phoofolo
- Ha Ramachine
- Ha Ramotete
- Ha Rankali
- Ha Rankhalile (Likocheng)
- Ha Rantung
- Ha Rapalo
- Ha Rapopo
- Ha Seele
- Ha Selone
- Ha Seoka
- Ha Sepiriti (Moterong)
- Ha Seutloali
- Ha Taeke (Liphakoeng)
- Ha Thaka-Mpholo
- Ha Thube
- Ha Tjobe
- Ha Tšekelo
- Ha Tšepo
- Ha Tšoeunyane
- Hlokoa-Le-Mafi
- Khafung
- Khalahali
- Kolone
- Koti-sephola
- Lipatolong
- Liphiring
- Mafikeng
- Mahlanyeng
- Majaheng
- Malieleng
- Mamathe
- Masoeling
- Mohlakeng
- Paballong
- Phuthing
- Sebala-Bala
- Sefateng
- Thota-Peli
- Tilimaneng and Tsila-Tsila
