= Maseru Central =

- Community Council / Constituency
- Likotsi Mountain seen from Ha Matala
- Nickname: MSU
- Geographic Center of Community
- Coordinates: 29°18′23″S 27°28′30″E
- Country: Lesotho
- District: Maseru District

Government
  - Type: DEMOGRACY
- Elevation: 5,112 ft (1,558 m)

Population (2006)
  - Total: 37,529
- Time zone: UTC+2 (CAT)
- Postal code: 100
- Coordinates computed via GeoNames.

Maseru Central is a constituency and community council in the Maseru Municipality located in the Maseru District of Lesotho. The population in 2006 was 37,529.

== Villages ==
The community of Maseru Central includes the villages of Katlehong, Lower Thetsane, Thetsane West and White City.

Others include: Bashanyaneng (Ha Tsolo), Florida, Ha Hoohlo, Ha Lesia, Ha Letlatsa (Qoaling), Qoatsaneng, Ha Ratjomose, Ha Thetsane, Ha Tikoe, Ha Tsolo, Hills View, LDF, Lekhalong (Ha Thetsane), Libataolong (Ha Tsolo), Mankoaneng (Ha Thetsane), Maseru Central, Maseru West, Matamong (Ha Thetsane), Matsoatlareng, New Europa, Old Europa, Race Course, Seqhobong (Ha Thetsane), Thaba-Tseka (Ha Tsolo), Lithabaneng, Ha Abia, Ha Leqele, Ha Matala, Upper Thamae, Lower Thamae.
