= Maluba-Lube =

- Community Council
- Geographic Center of Community
- Coordinates: 29°09′14″S 27°46′23″E
- Country: Lesotho
- District: Berea District
- Elevation: 5,440 ft (1,658 m)

Population (2006)
  - Total: 21,948
- Time zone: UTC+2 (CAT)
- Coordinates computed from Lesotho Villages file.

Maluba-Lube is a community council located in the Berea District of Lesotho. Its population in 2006 was 21,948.

== Villages ==
The community of Maluba-Lube includes the villages of Ha Bale, Ha Kalaele, Ha Kepi (Lithabaneng), Ha Lekhafola, Ha Mohapinyane, Ha Mohlaetoa, Ha Mokhothu, Ha Molemane, Ha Mopeli, Ha Motjoka, Ha Motseremeli, Ha Mphele, Ha Nkalimeng, Ha Ntjabane, Ha Ramajoro, Ha Ramonaheng, Ha Ratšiu, Ha Tebeli, Khoaba-Lea-Bua, Korokoro, Lecop, Lithabaneng and Ntširele (Ha Motjoka).
