= Motanasela =

- Community Council
- Geographic Center of Community
- Coordinates: 29°15′34″S 27°50′46″E
- Country: Lesotho
- District: Berea District
- Elevation: 5,814 ft (1,772 m)

Population (2006)
  - Total: 19,817
- Time zone: UTC+2 (CAT)
- Coordinates computed from Lesotho Villages file.

Motanasela is a community council located in the Berea District of Lesotho. Its population in 2006 was 19,817.

== Villages ==
The community of Motanasela includes the villages of Bothoba-Pelo, Furumela, Ha 'Methe, Ha 'Moso, Ha 'Neko, Ha Hoohlo, Ha Keoamang, Ha Khoale, Ha Koali, Ha Kokolia, Ha Kome, Ha Lephoi, Ha Lerata, Ha Lerotholi, Ha Letele, Ha Libe, Ha Lillane, Ha Litsebe, Ha Maetsela, Ha Makoaela, Ha Mantheki, Ha Masheane, Ha Mateka, Ha Matlere, Ha Mautsoe, Ha Moeketsi, Ha Mofota, Ha Mohlakolane, Ha Mokonyana, Ha Molahli, Ha Molangoanyane, Ha Moroke, Ha Morui, Ha Moruthoane, Ha Mosili, Ha Mosiuoa, Ha Mothebesoane, Ha Motšeare, Ha Mpoba, Ha Notši, Ha Ntsane, Ha Pateriki, Ha Peete, Ha Poqa, Ha Rakabaele, Ha Rakheleli, Ha Rakoto, Ha Ramatlama, Ha Ramonyaloe, Ha Ramothamo, Ha Ramothupi (Pitsaneng), Ha Rankatlo, Ha Samosamo, Ha Sebe, Ha Sebekele, Ha Sekhonyana, Ha Selomo, Ha Setulo, Ha Telukhunoana, Ha Tsoaleli, Hloahloeng, Katlehong (Ha Mokonyana), Kotisephola, Machoaboleng, Makaung, Matebeleng, Mokhukhung (Pitsaneng), Moreneng (Pitsaneng), Mosikoto (Pitsaneng), Sefateng, Soaing and Thota-Peli.
