= Berea District =

Coordinates: 29°10′S 27°55′E

Berea
- District
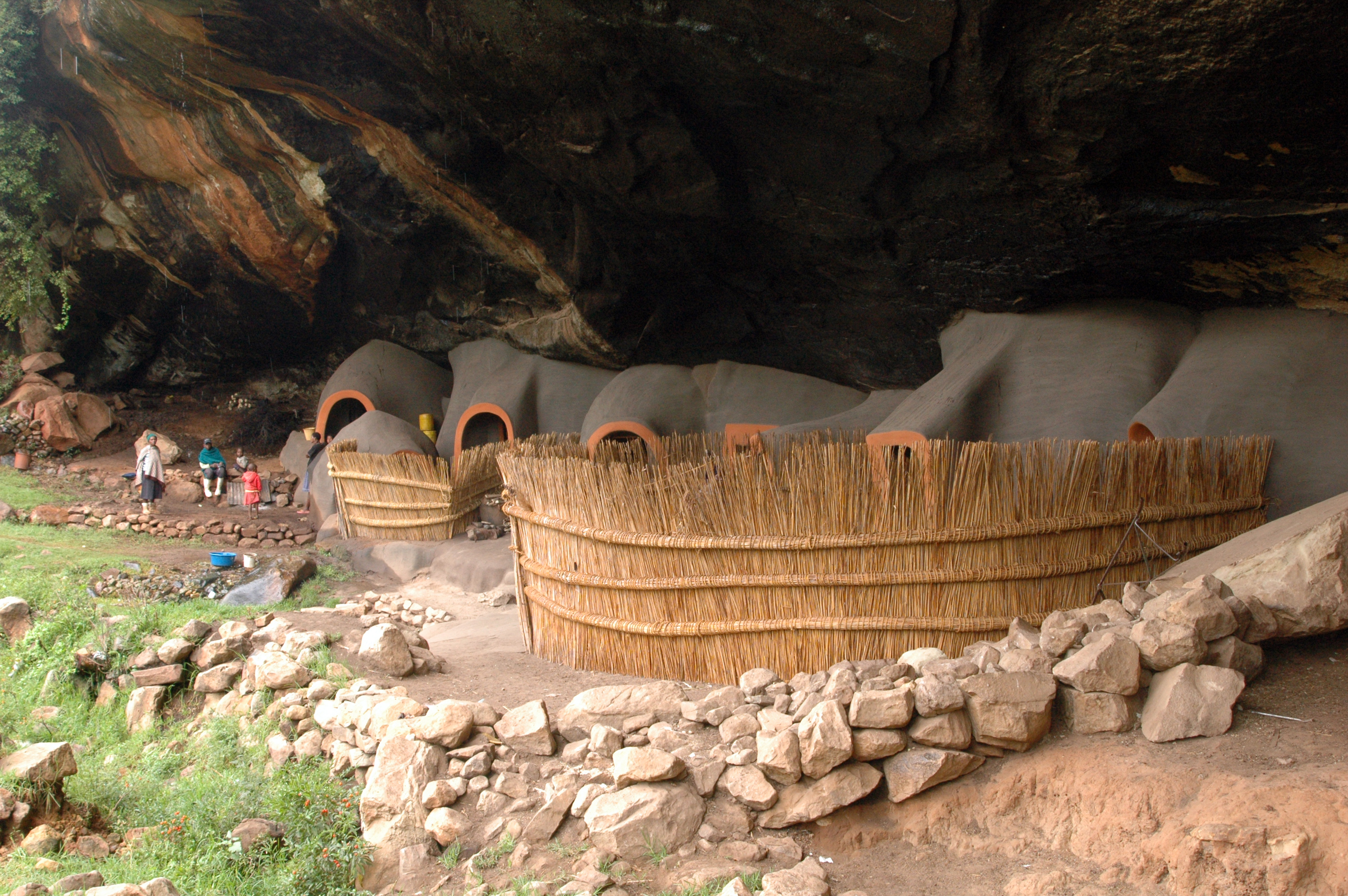
- Kome Cave Dwellings

- Map of Lesotho with the district highlighted
- Country: Lesotho
- Capital: Teyateyaneng

Area
  - Total: 2,222 km^{2} (858 sq mi)

Population (2014)
  - Total: 262,616
  - Density: 118.2/km^{2} (306.1/sq mi)
- Time zone: UTC+2 (CAT)
- Area code: +266
- Vehicle registration: D
- HDI (2019): 0.553 medium · 2nd

Berea is a district of Lesotho. In the west, Berea borders on the Free State Province of South Africa. Domestically, it borders on the following districts: Leribe District in the north, Thaba-Tseka District in southeast and Maseru District in the south. Teyateyaneng is the capital of the district. It is also home to the Kome Cave Dwellings. It is also the only district in Lesotho which is not named after its capital.

As of 2016, the district had a population of 262,616 which was 13.32 per cent of the total population of the country. The total area of the district was 2,222 which was 7.32 per cent of the total area of the country. As of 2008, there were 48 per cent economically active people in the district. There were totally 53,126 employed people out of a total of 100,776 people in the district above 15 years of age. The total area planted in 2009 was 25,303 which formed 6.27 per cent of the total area planted in the country, with maize being the major crop.

== Demographics ==
As of 2016, the district had a population of 262,616, 13.32 per cent of the population of the country. The area of the district was 2,222, 7.32 per cent of the country. The population density was 113.00 persons per square kilometre, compared to 62 for the country. There were ten constituencies and nine community councils in the district. As of 2006, 625 people tested HIV positive, 24.00 per cent of the country's HIV positive population. 269 of these were men (22.30%); 356 were women (25.20%).

== Geography ==
In the west, Berea borders on the Free State Province of South Africa. Domestically, it borders on the following districts: Leribe District in the north, Thaba-Tseka District in southeast and Maseru District in the south. The Western districts of Lesotho has predominantly low land zone with an elevation of 1,500 m (4,900 ft) 1,800 m (5,900 ft) above the sea level. These lands are the major agricultural zones in the country. The average annual rainfall in the country is 100 cm (39 in), most of which is received during the rainy season of October to April. Though it rains during all the months of the year, groundwater is limited on account of run-offs. The region has a temperate climate on account of the elevation and is humid during most parts of the year. The temperature in low lands vary from 32 °C (90 °F) to −7 °C (19 °F) in the winter.

Climate data for Berea District
| Month | Jan | Feb | Mar | Apr | May | Jun | Jul | Aug | Sep | Oct | Nov | Dec | Year |
|---|---|---|---|---|---|---|---|---|---|---|---|---|---|
| Mean daily maximum °C (°F) | 26 (79) | 27 (81) | 25 (77) | 23 (73) | 20 (68) | 17 (63) | 17 (63) | 20 (68) | 23 (73) | 27 (81) | 27 (81) | 28 (82) | 23 (74) |
| Mean daily minimum °C (°F) | 15 (59) | 15 (59) | 13 (55) | 6 (43) | 6 (43) | 3 (37) | 1 (34) | 0 (32) | 5 (41) | 12 (54) | 14 (57) | 16 (61) | 9 (48) |
| Average rainfall mm (inches) | 76 (3.0) | 98 (3.9) | 55 (2.2) | 28 (1.1) | 50 (2.0) | 34 (1.3) | 0 (0) | 0 (0) | 0 (0) | 22 (0.9) | 103 (4.1) | 68 (2.7) | 534 (21.0) |
Source 1:
Source 2:

== Economy and transport ==
As of 2008, there were 53,126 economically active people in the district. There were totally 53,126 employed people out of a total of 100,776 people in the district above 15 years of age. The employed population in the age group of 6–14 years was 968 out of a total of 27,368 people in the district in the age group. The labour force participation stood at 192.90. The number of people involved in subsistence agriculture is 830 and the number of people in other sectors was 138. The number of unemployed people in the district was 11,280 and the unemployment rate was 53.

The total area planted in 2009 was 25,303 which formed 6.27 per cent of the total area planted in the country. The total production was 9,151 tonnes, which was 6.08 per cent of the totals in the country. The major crop was maize, while wheat, sorghum, beans and peas were the other crops planted. The total production of maize was 6,901 tonnes, beans was 145 tonnes, sorghum was 59 tonnes, peas was 1,495 tonnes and wheat was 551 tonnes as of 2008.

== Administration ==
Constituencies of Berea District are: Bela-Bela, Khafung, Khubetsoana, Mabote, Makhoroana-Lube, Malimong, Mokhethoaneng, Mosalemane, Teya-Teyaneng, Thuathe and Tšoana-Makhulo. The community councils are Kanana, Kueneng, Mabote, Makeoana, Maluba-Lube, Mapoteng, Motanasela, Phuthiatsana, Senekane and Tebe-Tebe. As per the 1968 Local Government Repeal Act - Development Committees Order No.9 of 1986, a District Development Committee (DDC) should have a set of Ward Development Committees (WDC) for each ward and Village Development Committees (VDC) under it. Each VDC has a set of seven elected members and the head would be an ex-officio member and chairman of the committee. The WDC is composed of twelve members elected from about VDCs, whose chairman would be and ex-officio member. The fifteen-membered DDC is elected by the members of WDC. When there are cases of more than one DDC, the chiefs would alternate in meetings. The district secretary co-ordinates the activities of the various committees. As per the Local Government Amendment Act 2004, the District Development Coordination Committee was established as the supreme body of district administration, under which all the district councils were branched. The urban and municipal councils were under each district council, which in turn had community councils under it. The Independent Electoral Commission (IEC) is responsible for the administration of the Local Government Elections. The nation's first local government elections were conducted in April 2005, while the most recent elections were held in October 2011. During these elections, 64 community councils, 11 urban councils and one municipal council were elected.

== See also ==
- Battle of Berea
- Moshoeshoe I
- Ha Mots'eremeli
