= Manonyane =

- Community Council
- Sandstone mountains north of A5 in Mahlanyeng

- Geographic Center of Community
- Coordinates: 29°28′26″S 27°43′57″E
- Country: Lesotho
- District: Maseru District
- Elevation: 6,211 ft (1,893 m)
- Time zone: UTC+2 (CAT)
- Coordinates computed from Lesotho Villages file.

Manonyane is a community council located in the Maseru District of Lesotho. Its population in 2006 was 22,491.

== Villages ==
The community of Manonyane includes the villages of:

- Fika-le-Motho
- Ha Elia
- Ha Filipi
- Ha Ikaneng
- Ha Khoarai
- Ha Kholoko
- Ha Koili
- Ha Lebamang
- Ha Lehloba
- Ha Lisheane
- Ha Maama
- Ha Mabathoana
- Ha Machai
- Ha Maese
- Ha Mafefooane
- Ha Makafane
- Ha Makoili
- Ha Maribenyane
- Ha Matiase
- Ha Matsebetsebe
- Ha Meshaka
- Ha Mokela
- Ha Mokhohla
- Ha Mokhosi
- Ha Mokoma
- Ha Moling
- Ha Monyooe
- Ha Mopenyaki
- Ha Morabaki
- Ha Morema
- Ha Motanyane
- Ha Motebele
- Ha Nthulenyane
- Ha Ntsibane
- Ha Paanya
- Ha Patrick
- Ha Ramokholutsoane
- Ha Ramoropane
- Ha Seqoma
- Ha Soibilane
- Ha Teboho
- Ha Tlapana
- Ha Tlapole,
- Ha Tšehlo
- Ha Tšeliso
- Ha Tsiki
- Ha Tsunyane
- Hata-Butle
- Khobeng
- Khubetsoana
- Likhorong
- Liphakoeng
- Liphehleng
- Litenteng
- Mafikeng
- Mafikeng (Ha Motoko)
- Mahlanyeng
- Makepeng
- Malimong
- Mangoapeng
- Mangopeng
- Maphotong
- Matobo
- Mikaeleng (Ha Pasane)
- Mohohlong
- Moreneng
- NUL Campus
- Pae-lea-itlhatsoa
- Thabana-Tšooana
- Thoteng, Tloutle (Ha Shale)
- Tloutle (Sekhutlong)
- Tloutle (Thabana-Tšooana)
- Voka
