= Leszek Matela =

Polish journalist and dowser

Leszek Matela (born 15 April 1955) is a Polish journalist, a dowser, expert of feng shui and geomancy, teacher of suggestopedia, a researcher of the Wawel Chakra, and many Earth mysteries.

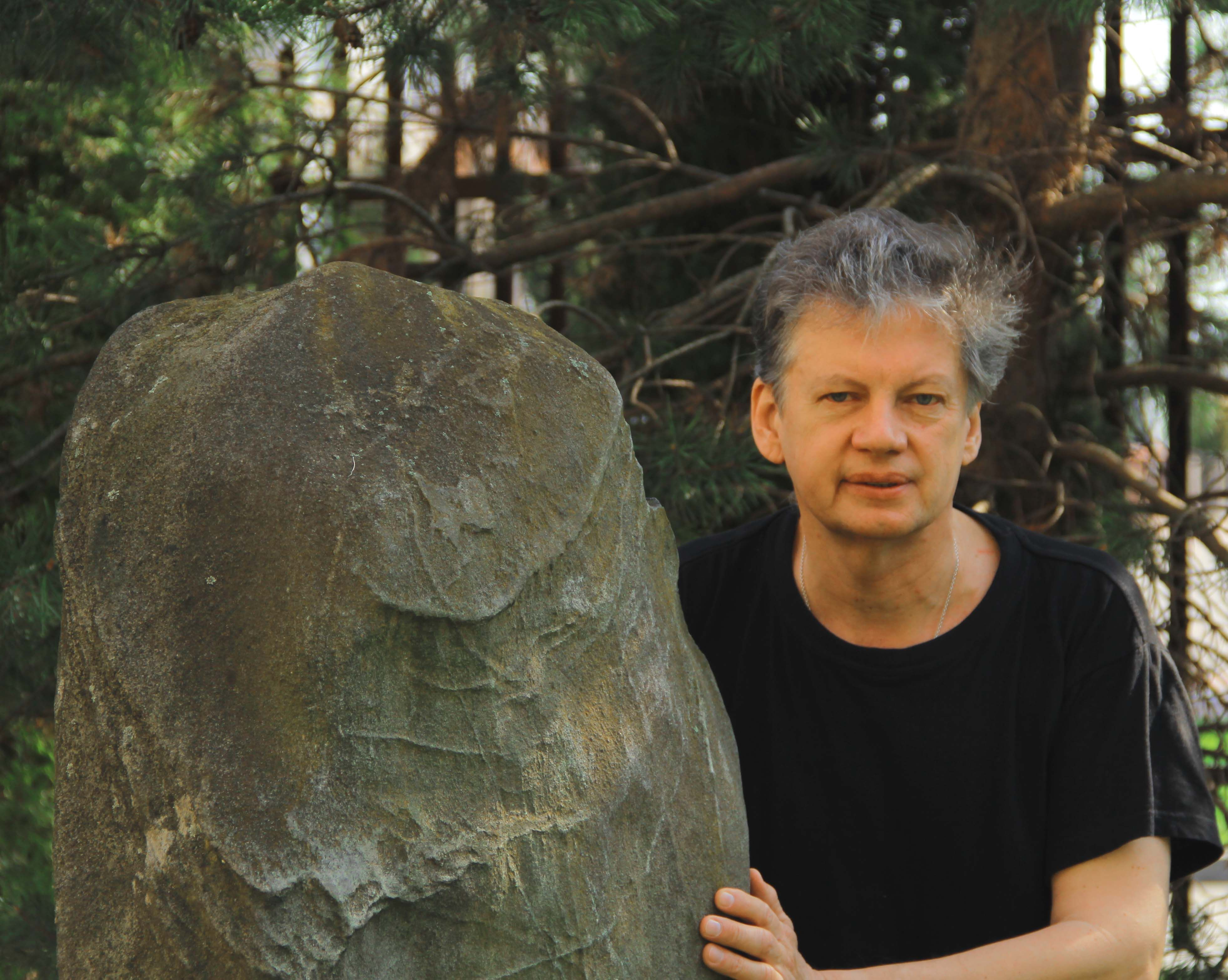
Leszek Matela - with the megalith in Bialystok, 25.04.2011.jpg

He is also the author of numerous books about radiesthesia, geomancy, parapsychology, runes, naturopathy and esoterics in Polish, Czech, and German. He is also known for television and radio shows devoted to radiesthesia and geomancy. He runs recognized courses of radiesthesia and geomancy and is considered to be an authority in these areas. His articles were also published in Great Britain, USA and Australia.

== Selected bibliography of books in Polish ==
- ABC wahadła, 1999, ISBN 83-86737-61-1 (ABC of the Pendulum)
- ABC różdżki, 1999, ISBN 978-83-86737-64-2 (ABC of the Dowsing Rod)
- ABC chromoterapii, 2000, ISBN 83-86737-94-8 (ABC of the Chromotherapy)
- ABC feng shui, 2000, ISBN 83-86737-03-4 (ABC of Feng Shui)
- Polskie feng shui, 2001 ISBN 83-88351-80-X (Polish Feng Shui)
- Oddziaływanie kształtów i symboli, 2002, (with co-author Otylia Sakowska) ISBN 83-88351-34-6 (The Influence of the Forms and Symbols)
- Tajemnice czakramu wawelskiego sekrety Krakowa, 2004 ISBN 83-7377-113-1 (Mysteries of the Wawel Chakra and Cracow)
- Runy dla Ciebie, 2003 ISBN 83-7377-053-4 (Runes for You)
- Tajemnice Słowian, 2005, ISBN 83-7377-178-6 (Secrets of the Slavs)
- Jak korzystać z energii miejsc mocy?, 2008 ISBN 978-83-7377-338-7 (How Can We Use Energy of Places of Power?)
- Polska magiczna, 2009, ISBN 978-83-7377-362-2 (Magic Poland)
- Pieczęć Wirakoczy i tajemnice Inków , 2012, ISBN 978-83-917420-7-5 (Seal of Viracocha and Secrets of the Inca)
