= Likalaneng =

- Community Council
- Geographic Center of Community
- Coordinates: 29°27′54″S 28°05′52″E
- Country: Lesotho
- District: Maseru District
- Elevation: 7,096 ft (2,163 m)

Population (2006)
  - Total: 10,757
- Time zone: UTC+2 (CAT)
- Coordinates computed from Lesotho Villages file.

Likalaneng is a community council located in the Maseru District of Lesotho. Its population in 2006 was 10,757.

== Villages ==
The community of Likalaneng includes the villages of:

- Aupolasi
- Boitšireletso
- Feeder Camp
- Freistata
- Ha Joele
- Ha Khama
- Ha Khojane
- Ha Khosi
- Ha Lebiletsa
- Ha Lebusa
- Ha Lempe
- Ha Letapata
- Ha Letele
- Ha Likomisi
- Ha Makhobalo
- Ha Maliehe
- Ha Matlapu
- Ha Matšabisa
- Ha Matsoai
- Ha Moalosi

- Ha Mochochoko
- Ha Mofubetsoana
- Ha Mokebisa
- Ha Mokhanya
- Ha Mokhathi
- Ha Montši
- Ha Moqobokoane
- Ha Mosito
- Ha Motloang
- Ha Motoko (Phuleng)
- Ha Mphakho
- Ha Nyakane
- Ha Pae-pae
- Ha Phomolo
- Ha Raloti
- Ha Rantelali
- Ha Rapolokoane
- Ha Rasepukunyane
- Ha Sankong
- Ha Sefele

- Ha Seiboko
- Ha Setala
- Ha Soosa
- Ha Teri
- Ha Thaba-Bosiu
- Ha Tholoana
- Ha Tlali
- Ha Tšitso
- Ha Tsolo
- Khoshane
- Khubetsoana
- Kolobere
- Lehlakeng
- Leropong
- Letlapeng
- Mafotholeng
- Mahooaneng
- Makoaeleng
- Malerung
- Mangope-matšo

- Matsiring
- Moeaneng
- Mohale Camp
- Mokh'ukh'ung
- Mokhoabong
- Monontša
- Panteng
- Patising (Ha Malebanye)
- Sea-point
- Sehlabaneng
- Sekokoaneng
- Sethamana
- Tetebela
- Thaba-Putsoa
- Thoteng
- Tiping
- Tsehlong
- Tšieng
