= Makhoarane =

- Community Council
- Geographic Center of Community
- Coordinates: 29°37′14″S 27°32′04″E
- Country: Lesotho
- District: Maseru District
- Elevation: 5,380 ft (1,640 m)

Population (2006)
  - Total: 26,674
- Time zone: UTC+2 (CAT)
- Coordinates computed from Lesotho Villages file.

Makhoarane is a community council located in the Maseru District of Lesotho. Its population in 2006 was 26,674.

== Villages ==
The community of Makhoarane includes the villages of:

- Aupolasi
- Bethane (Kholokoe)
- Boreipala
- Fuleng
- Ha Batere
- Ha Bolese
- Ha Folene
- Ha Jobo
- Ha Khoahla
- Ha Khulomi
- Ha Lekhooa
- Ha Lepipi
- Ha Leutsoa
- Ha Likhama
- Ha Mafa
- Ha Mafafa
- Ha Makhabane
- Ha Makhetha
- Ha Malingoana
- Ha Maphathe
- Ha Matela
- Ha Mofumotse
- Ha Mohloanyane
- Ha Moima
- Ha Moitheri
- Ha Mojela
- Ha Molahlehi
- Ha Moorosi
- Ha Moremi
- Ha Moruthoane
- Ha Mpesela
- Ha Mphethi
- Ha Nkaka
- Ha Nkofi
- Ha Ntele
- Ha Paanya
- Ha Palama
- Ha Petje
- Ha Phalole
- Ha Ramabele
- Ha Ramakhunong
- Ha Raphoka
- Ha Ratsilonyane
- Ha Robose (Mokubata)
- Ha Sanaha
- Ha Santi
- Ha Sebete
- Ha Seelane
- Ha Sehlahla
- Ha Sehlokohlo
- Ha Sekhobe
- Ha Sekoai
- Ha Sekoala
- Ha Setala
- Ha Setipe
- Ha Sola
- Ha Sonti
- Ha Soothi
- Ha Taele
- Ha Taka
- Ha Thabo
- Ha Thite
- Ha Toka
- Ha Toloane
- Ha Tšehlo
- Ha Tšepe
- Ha Tšilo
- Ha Tšilonyane
- Ha Tšoene
- Ha Tumaki
- Kanana
- Kerekeng
- Kholokoe
- Lefikaneng
- Letlapeng
- Likhoiting
- Lithotseleng
- Mabenkeleng
- Maetheng
- Mafikeng
- Makeneng
- Makhonofane
- Makoabating
- Malekhalana
- Maloaleng
- Mantsaneng
- Mapoleseng
- Matsieng
- Mauteng (Masojaneng)
- Mauteng (Matebeleng)
- Mekateng
- Mohlominyane
- Moreneng
- Morija
- Moshoeshoe II
- Musa-Pelo
- Oporolo
- Phahameng
- Salisi
- Terai Hoek
- Thabong
- Thotaneng
- Tlokoeng
- Tsitsa and Vukazensele
