= Ratau =

- Community Council
- Geographic Center of Community
- Coordinates: 29°22′58″S 27°47′21″E
- Country: Lesotho
- District: Maseru District
- Elevation: 5,942 ft (1,811 m)

Population (2006)
  - Total: 26,582
- Time zone: UTC+2 (CAT)
- Coordinates computed from Lesotho Villages file.

Ratau is a community council located in the Maseru District of Lesotho. Its population in 2006 was 26,582.

== Villages ==
The community of Ratau includes the villages of Ha Ino, Ha Kapa, Ha Kopano (Meeling), Ha Kubutu, Ha Lekhutle, Ha Lesaoana, Ha Lethena, Ha Maimane, Ha Majoro, Ha Makhabane, Ha Makhale, Ha Makopong, Ha Makotoko, Ha Mapale, Ha Masakale, Ha Masupha, Ha Masupha (Ha Motho-Motšoana), Ha Masupha (Pontšeng), Ha Matela, Ha Matjeke, Ha Matlangoane, Ha Moetsa, Ha Mofammere, Ha Moji, Ha Mokete, Ha Molengoane, Ha Mosoeu, Ha Mosotho, Ha Mosuoe, Ha Mothae, Ha Mothokho, Ha Motjoka, Ha Motleleng, Ha Mpao, Ha Mphuke, Ha Mpiti, Ha Nkhema, Ha Nkhema (Thoteng), Ha Nkokomohi, Ha Nqheku, Ha Nqosa, Ha Ntainyane, Ha Ntsi, Ha Phaloane, Ha Raanye, Ha Rabotsoa, Ha Rachere, Ha Ralejoe, Ha Ramakabatane, Ha Ramakhaba, Ha Ramotšoane, Ha Ramotšoane (Sekhutlong), Ha Rankota, Ha Ratau, Ha Sechaba, Ha Seeiso, Ha Sekantši, Ha Sekete, Ha Seoehlana, Ha Sephoko, Ha Tieli, Ha Tjopa, Ha Tsoili, Ha Tumahole, Khoiti-ntle, Kotopeng, Maemeng, Makatseng, Malekokoana, Manganeng, Mohlaka-oa-tuka, Moreneng, Motjokeng, Motse-mocha, Ponoane, Sekhutlong, Takalatsa, Thaha-lia-Tloka, Thoteng and Toll Gate.
