= Borata =

Town in Lesotho

- Town
- Location within Lesotho
- Coordinates: 29.89455°S 27.24106°E
- Country: Lesotho
- District: Mafeteng
- Time zone: UTC+2:00 (SAST)

Borata is a town in southwestern Lesotho. It is located to the southeast of Mafeteng, close to the border with South Africa.
