= Maseru District =

District of Lesotho

Coordinates: 29°30′S 28°00′E

Maseru
- District
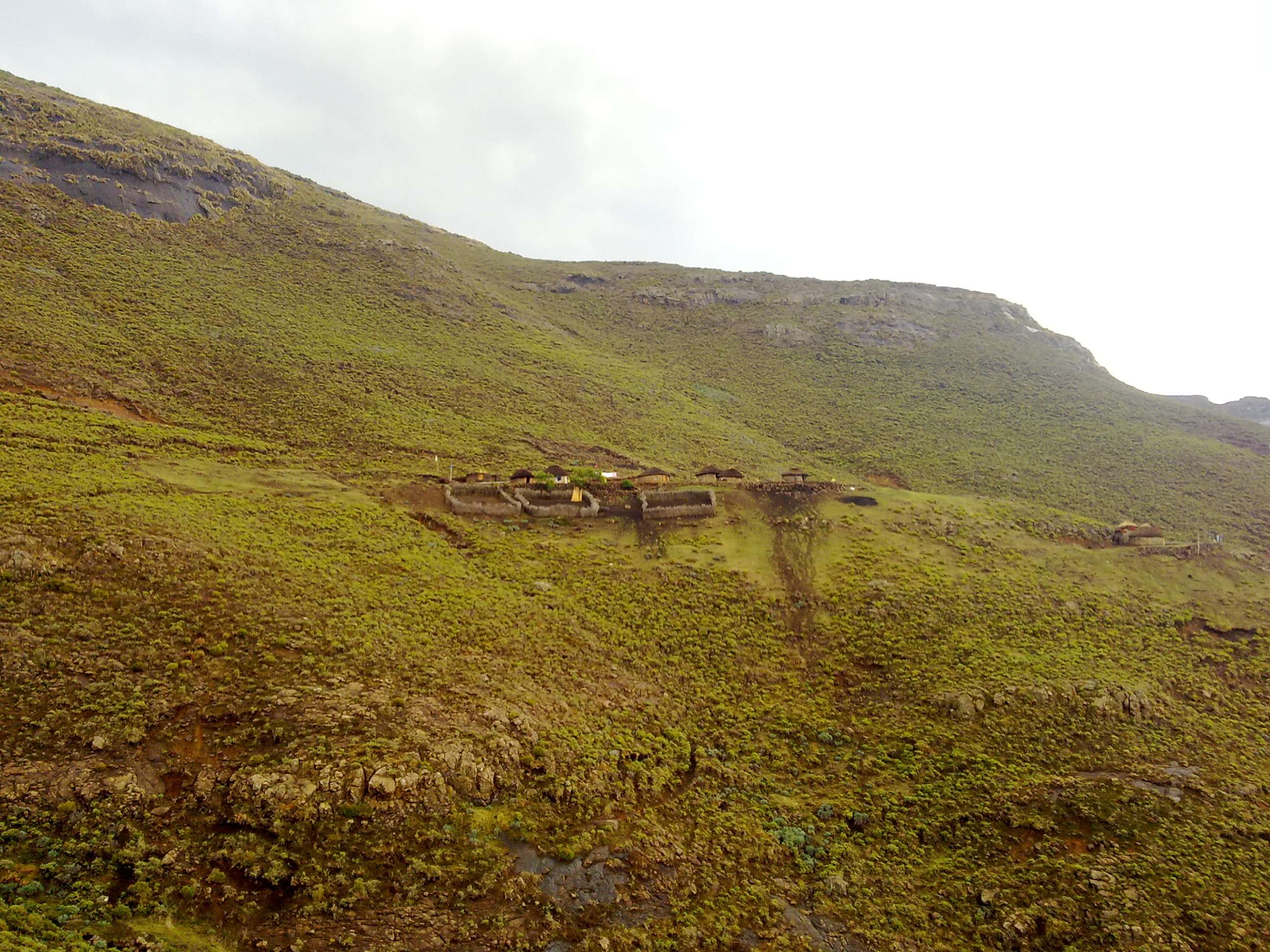
- Baboons Pass, Maseru District

- Map of Lesotho with the district highlighted
- Country: Lesotho
- Capital: Maseru

Area
  - Total: 4,279 km^{2} (1,652 sq mi)

Population (2016)
  - Total: 519,186
  - Density: 121.3/km^{2} (314.3/sq mi)
- Time zone: UTC+2 (CAT)
- Postal code: 100
- Area code: +266
- Vehicle registration: A/M
- HDI (2019): 0.560 medium · 1st

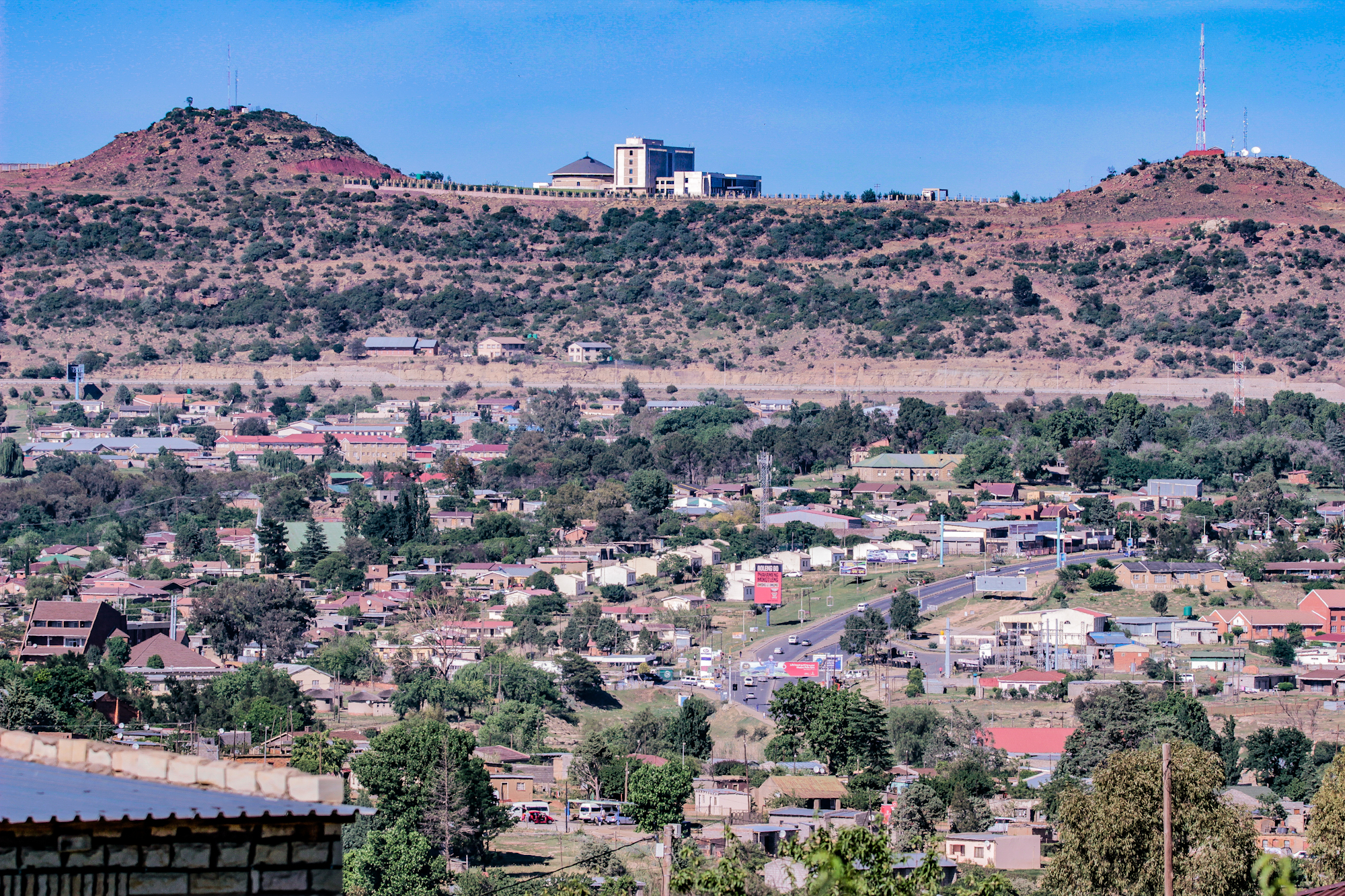
Maseru City, the capital and largest city

Maseru is a district of Lesotho. Maseru is also the name of the district's capital, and is the only city in the district and also the capital of the country. It is the largest urban area in the country, and therefore the only city. The city of Maseru is located on Lesotho's western border with the Free State Province of South Africa, the frontier being the Caledon River. Maseru borders on Berea District in north, Thaba-Tseka District in the east, Mohale's Hoek District in south, and Mafeteng District in southwest.

As of 2006, the district had a population of 431,998 which was 23.02 per cent of the total population of the country. The total area of the district was 4,279 which was 14.10 per cent of the total area of the country. The density of population in the district was 101.00 per km^{2}. As of 2008, there were 52 economically active people in the district. There were totally 294,062 employed people out of a total of 585,770 people in the district above 15 years of age.

== Demographics ==
As of 2006, the district had a population of 431,998, 23.02 per cent of the population of the country. The area of the district was 4,279 square kilometers, 14.10 per cent of the country. The population density was 101.00 persons per square kilometre, compared to the 62 for the country. There were eighteen constituencies and twenty-three community counciles in the district. As of 2006, 1318 people tested HIV positive, 25.50 per cent of the HIV-positive persons in the country. 522 of these (18.10%) were men; 796 (29.90%) were women.

== Economy ==
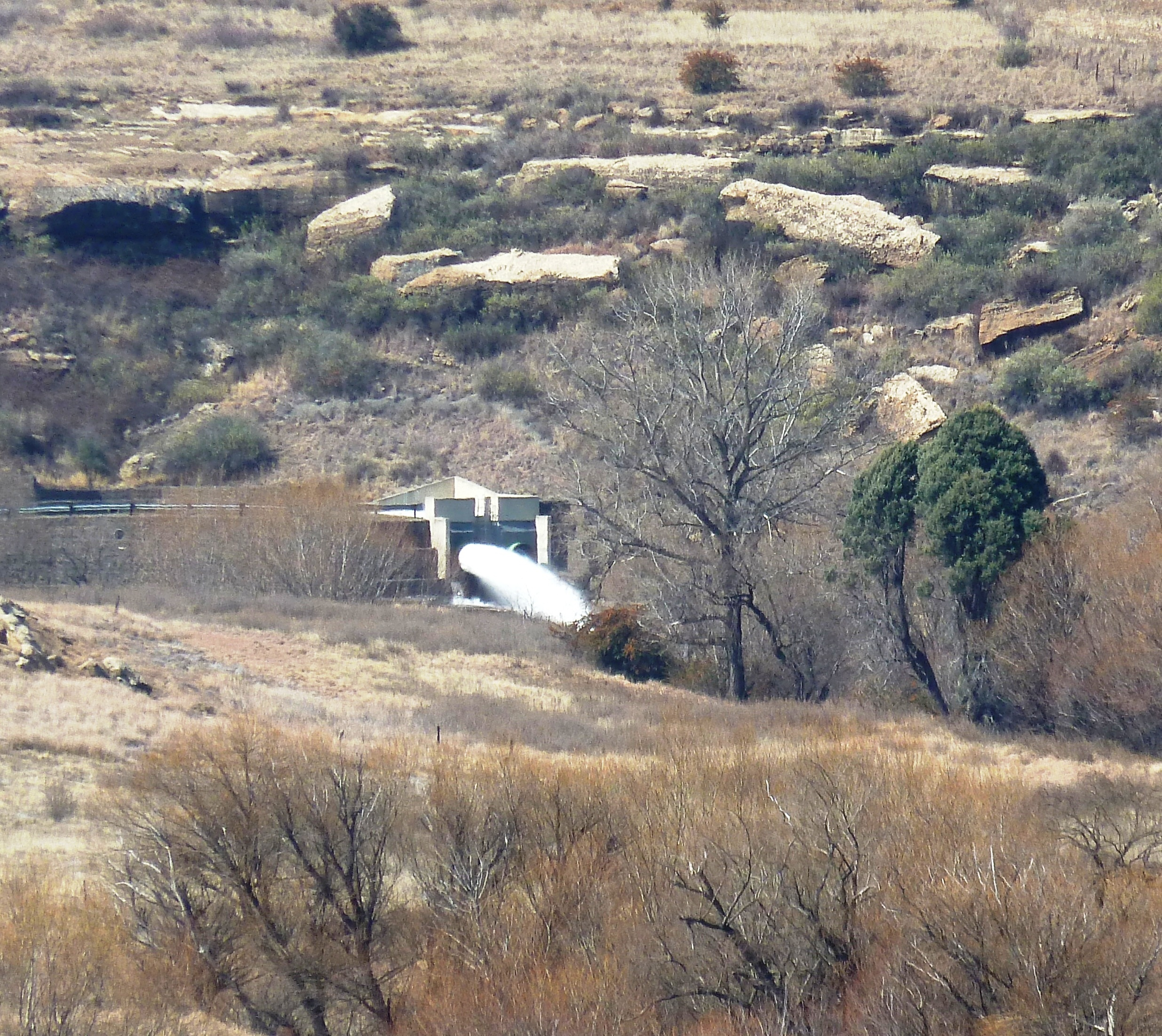
Caledon River

As of 2008, there were totally 294,062 employed people out of a total of 585,770 people in the district above 15 years of age. The employed population in the age group of 6–14 years was 2,454 out of a total of 157,714 people in the district in the age group. The labour force participation stood at 197.80. The number of people involved in subsistence agriculture is 1,380 and the number of people in other sectors was 1,074. The number of unemployed people in the district was 90,050 and the unemployment rate was 070. The total area planted in 2009 was 20,998 which formed 5.20 per cent of the total area planted in the country. The total production was 10,773 tonnes, which was 7.15 per cent of the totals in the country. The major crop was maize, while wheat, sorghum, beans and peas were the other crops planted. The total production of maize was 8,891 tonnes, beans was 120 tonnes, sorghum was 066 tonnes, peas was 1,066 tonnes and wheat was 630 tonnes as of 2008. As of 2007, there were a total of 391 km (243 mi) of paved roads in the district, with 281 km (175 mi) paved roads and 110 km (68 mi) of unpaved roads.

== Geography ==
The city of Maseru is located on Lesotho's western border with the Free State Province of South Africa, the frontier being the Caledon River (Sesotho: Mohokare). Maseru borders on the following districts, namely, Berea District in north, Thaba-Tseka District in the east, Mohale's Hoek District in south, and Mafeteng District in southwest. The Western districts of Lesotho has predominantly low land zone with an elevation of 1,500 m (4,900 ft) 1,800 m (5,900 ft) above the sea level. These lands are the major agricultural zones in the country. The average annual rainfall in the country is 100 cm (39 in), most of which is received during the rainy season of October to April. Though it rains during all the months of the year, groundwater is limited on account of run-offs. The region has a temperate climate on account of the elevation and is humid during most parts of the year. The temperature in low lands vary from 32 °C (90 °F) to −7 °C (19 °F) in the winter.

Climate data for Maseru District
| Month | Jan | Feb | Mar | Apr | May | Jun | Jul | Aug | Sep | Oct | Nov | Dec | Year |
|---|---|---|---|---|---|---|---|---|---|---|---|---|---|
| Mean daily maximum °C (°F) | 27 (81) | 27 (81) | 25 (77) | 22 (72) | 19 (66) | 16 (61) | 17 (63) | 21 (70) | 23 (73) | 28 (82) | 28 (82) | 29 (84) | 24 (74) |
| Mean daily minimum °C (°F) | 15 (59) | 15 (59) | 12 (54) | 7 (45) | 6 (43) | 2 (36) | 0 (32) | 5 (41) | 5 (41) | 12 (54) | 14 (57) | 15 (59) | 9 (48) |
| Average rainfall mm (inches) | 146 (5.7) | 53 (2.1) | 105 (4.1) | 33 (1.3) | 43 (1.7) | 51 (2.0) | 0 (0) | 5 (0.2) | 2 (0.1) | 16 (0.6) | 127 (5.0) | 68 (2.7) | 649 (25.6) |
Source 1:
Source 2:

== Constituencies ==
Constituencies of Maseru District are Abia, Koro-Koro, Likotsi, Lithabaneng, Lithoteng, Maama Machache, Majoe-a-Litšoene, Makhaleng, Maletsunyane, Maseru, Matala, Matsieng, Motimposo, Qeme, Qoaling, Rothe, Stadium Area, Thaba Bosiu, Thaba-Putsoa, Thetsane and Tsolo. The community councils of Maseru District are Abia, Likalaneng, Lilala, Lithabaneng, Lithoteng, Makheka, Makhoarane, Makhalaneng, Makolopetsane, Manonyane, Maseru Central, Mazenod, Mohlakeng, Motimposo, Nyakosoba, Qiloane, Qoaling, Ratau, Ribaneng, Semonkong, Stadium Area and Telle As per the 1968 Local Government Repeal Act - Development Committees Order No.9 of 1986, a District Development Committee (DDC) should have a set of Ward Development Committees (WDC) for each ward and Village Development Committees (VDC) under it. Each VDC has a set of seven elected members and the head would be an ex-officio member and chairman of the committee. The WDC is composed of twelve members elected from about VDCs, whose chairman would be and ex-officio member. The fifteen-membered DDC is elected by the members of WDC. When there are cases of more than one DDC, the chiefs would alternate in meetings. The district secretary co-ordinates the activities of the various committees. As per the Local Government Amendment Act 2004, the District Development Coordination Committee was established as the supreme body of district administration, under which all the district councils were branched. The urban and municipal councils were under each district council, which in turn had community councils under it. The Independent Electoral Commission (IEC) is responsible for the administration of the Local Government Elections. The nation's first local government elections were conducted in April 2005, while the most recent elections were held in October 2011. During these elections, 64 community councils, 11 urban councils and one municipal council were elected.
