= Constituencies of Lesotho =

- Map of all 80 constituencies
- Category: Electoral districts
- Location: Lesotho
- Number: 80 (as of 2026)
- Government: National Assembly

The National Assembly of the Kingdom of Lesotho is elected through 80 constituencies.

== Constituencies ==
=== Butha-Buthe ===
Constituency		Electors	Ref.
No.	Name	Electors	Ref.
1	Mechachane	12,977	
2	Hololo	15,950	
3	Motete	14,366	
4	Qalo	14,957	
5	Butha-Buthe	14,466	

=== Leribe ===
Constituency		Electors	Ref.
No.	Name	Electors	Ref.
6	Maliba-Matso	15,414	
7	Mphosong	17,380	
8	Thaba-Phatsoa	15,620	
9	Mahobong	14,239	
10	Pela Ts'oeu	14,195	
11	Matlakeng	15,725	
12	Leribe	16,065	
13	Hlotse	16,463	
14	Tsikoane	17,574	
15	Maputsoe	16,970	
16	Moselinyane	22,883	
17	Peka	14,559	
18	Kolonyama	13,870	

=== Berea ===
Constituency		Electors	Ref.
No.	Name	Electors	Ref.
19	Mosalemane	14,004	
20	'Makhoroana	14,143	
21	Bela-Bela	14,005	
22	Malimong	15,383	
23	Khafung	13,956	
24	Teya-Teyaneng	14,160	
25	Tsoana-Makhulo	13,240	
26	Thuathe	15,050	
27	Mokhethoaneng	16,739	
28	Khubetsoana	17,015	
29	Mabote	16,064	

=== Maseru ===
Constituency		Electors	Ref.
No.	Name	Electors	Ref.
30	Motimposo	16,727	
31	Majoe-Lits'oene	14,190	
32	Stadium Area	15,992	
33	Maseru	15,857	
34	Thetsane	14,834	
35	Tsolo	15,654	
36	Likotsi	16,020	
37	Qoaling	15,784	
38	Lithoteng	15,670	
39	Abia	15,742	
40	Lithabaneng	14,928	
41	Matala	14,239	
42	Thaba-Bosiu	15,835	
43	Machache	16,168	
44	Thaba-Putsoa	14,165	
45	Maama	15,167	
46	Koro-Koro	16,363	
47	Qeme	14,722	
48	Rothe	14,269	
49	Matsieng	15,374	
50	Makhaleng	14,643	
51	Maletsunyane	13,977	

=== Mafeteng ===
Constituency		Electors	Ref.
No.	Name	Electors	Ref.
52	Thaba-Phechela	14,060	
53	Phoqoane	17,781	
54	Matelile	13,822	
55	Maliepetsane	16,034	
56	Thabana-Morena	16,134	
57	Qalabane	15,842	
58	Mafeteng	16,982	

=== Mohale's Hoek ===
Constituency		Electors	Ref.
No.	Name	Electors	Ref.
59	Taung	14,329	
60	Mpharane	14,336	
61	Mohale's Hoek	19,824	
62	Mekaling	17,051	
63	Phamong	19,861	
64	Hloahloeng	13,824	

=== Quthing ===
Constituency		Electors	Ref.
No.	Name	Electors	Ref.
65	Moyeni	19,789	
66	Sempe	14,731	
67	Mt. Moorosi	17,334	
68	Qhoali	17,458	

=== Qacha's Nek ===
Constituency		Electors	Ref.
No.	Name	Electors	Ref.
69	Qacha's Nek	18,401	
70	Lebakeng	12,806	
71	Tsoelike	12,749	

=== Thaba-Tseka ===
Constituency		Electors	Ref.
No.	Name	Electors	Ref.
72	Mantsonyane	13,863	
73	Thaba-Moea	12,807	
74	Thaba-Tseka	16,834	
75	Semena	16,843	
76	Mashai	14,521	

=== Mokhotlong ===
Constituency		Electors	Ref.
No.	Name	Electors	Ref.
77	Malingoaneng	14,371	
78	Malingoaneng	14,077	
79	Mokhotlong	14,422	
80	Bobatsi	13,070	

== See also ==
- Community councils of Lesotho
- Districts of Lesotho
