= Outline of Lesotho =

Overview of and topical guide to Lesotho

The Flag of Lesotho

The Coat of arms of Lesotho

The location of Lesotho

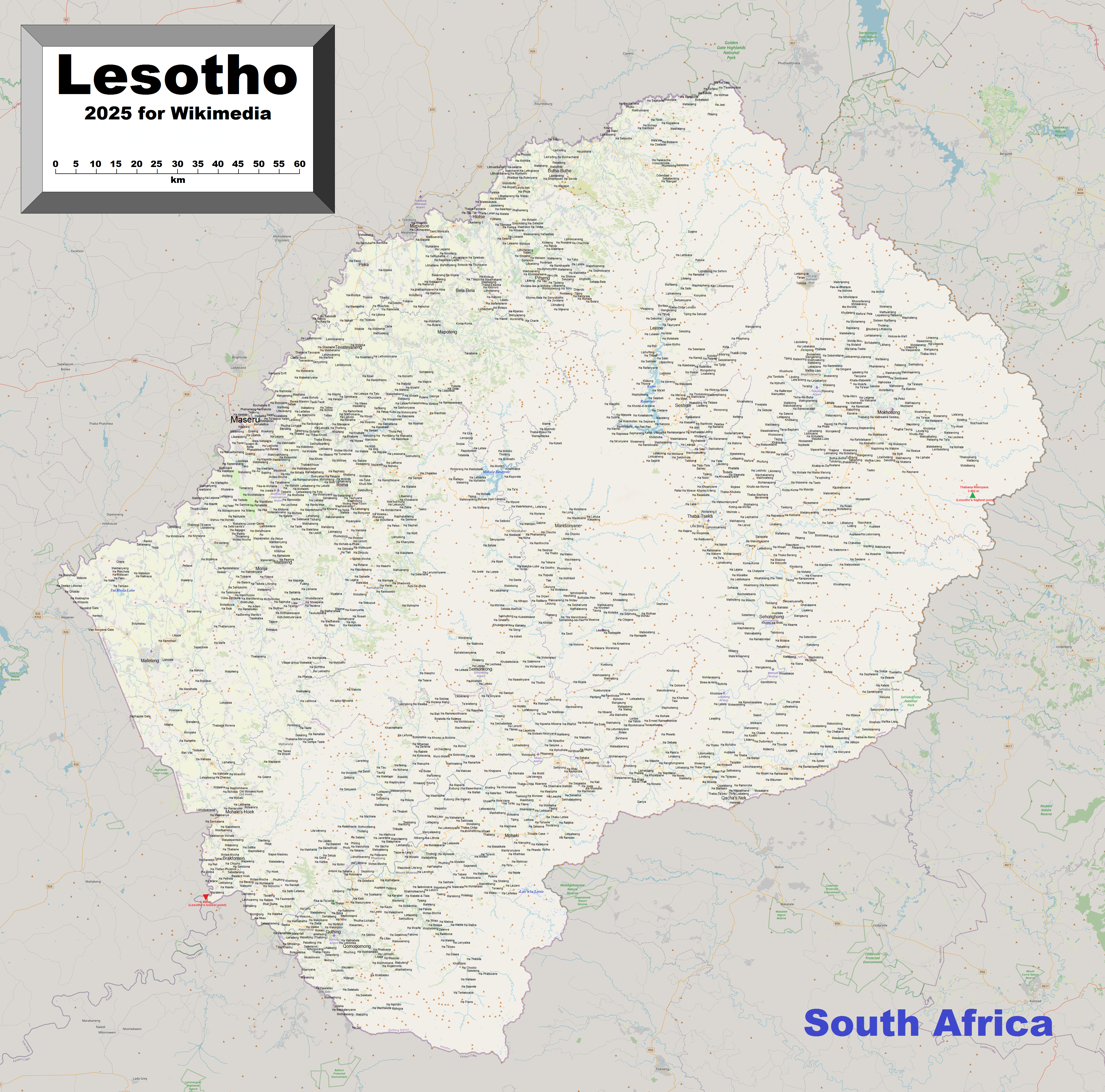
An enlargeable, detailed map of the Kingdom of Lesotho

The following outline is provided as an overview of and topical guide to Lesotho:

Lesotho – sovereign country located in Southern Africa. Lesotho is an enclave completely surrounded by the Republic of South Africa. Formerly Basutoland, it is a member of the Commonwealth of Nations. The name Lesotho roughly translates into "the land of the people who speak Sesotho."

== General reference ==
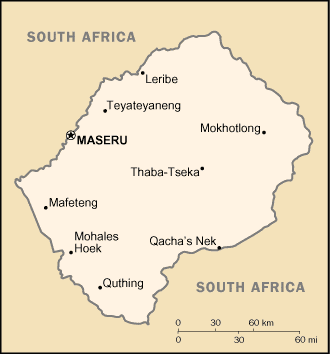
An enlargeable basic map of Lesotho

- Pronunciation: /lɪˈsuːtuː/
- Common English country name: Lesotho
- Official English country name: The Kingdom of Lesotho
- Common endonym(s):
- Official endonym(s):
- Adjectival(s): Basotho
- Demonym(s):
- ISO country codes: LS, LSO, 426
- ISO region codes: See ISO 3166-2:LS
- Internet country code top-level domain: .ls

== Geography of Lesotho ==
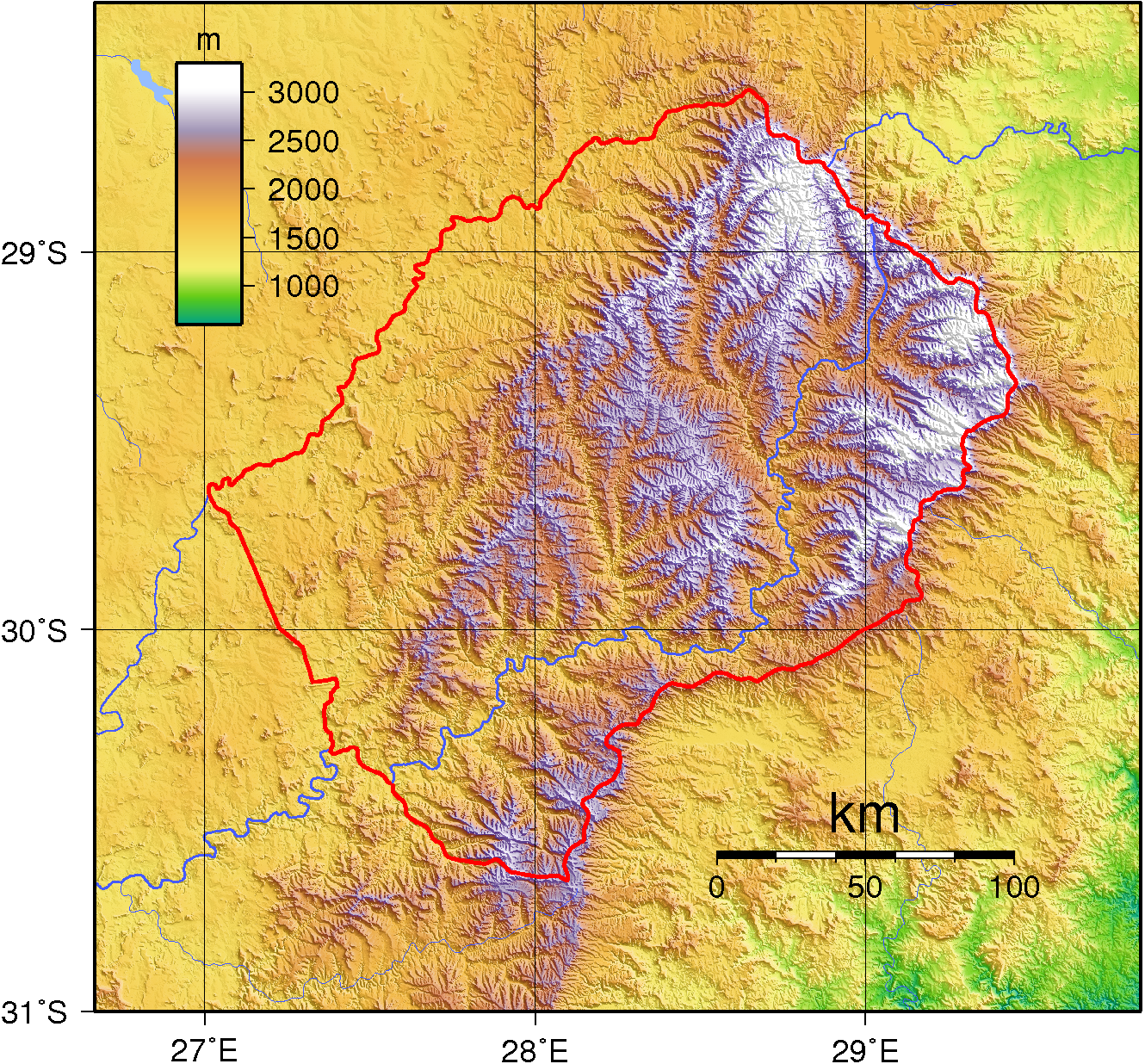
An enlargeable topographic map of Lesotho

Geography of Lesotho

- Lesotho is: a landlocked country
- Location:
  - Eastern Hemisphere and Southern Hemisphere
  - Africa
    - Southern Africa
      - Surrounded by South Africa (the country)
  - Time zone: South African Standard Time (UTC+02)
  - Extreme points of Lesotho
    - High: Thabana Ntlenyana 3,482 m (11,424 ft)
    - Low: Confluence of Orange River and Makhaleng River 1,400 m (4,593 ft)
  - Land boundaries: South Africa 909 km
  - Coastline: none
- Population of Lesotho: 2,008,000 – 144th most populous country
- Area of Lesotho: 30,355 km^{2}
- Atlas of Lesotho

=== Environment of Lesotho ===
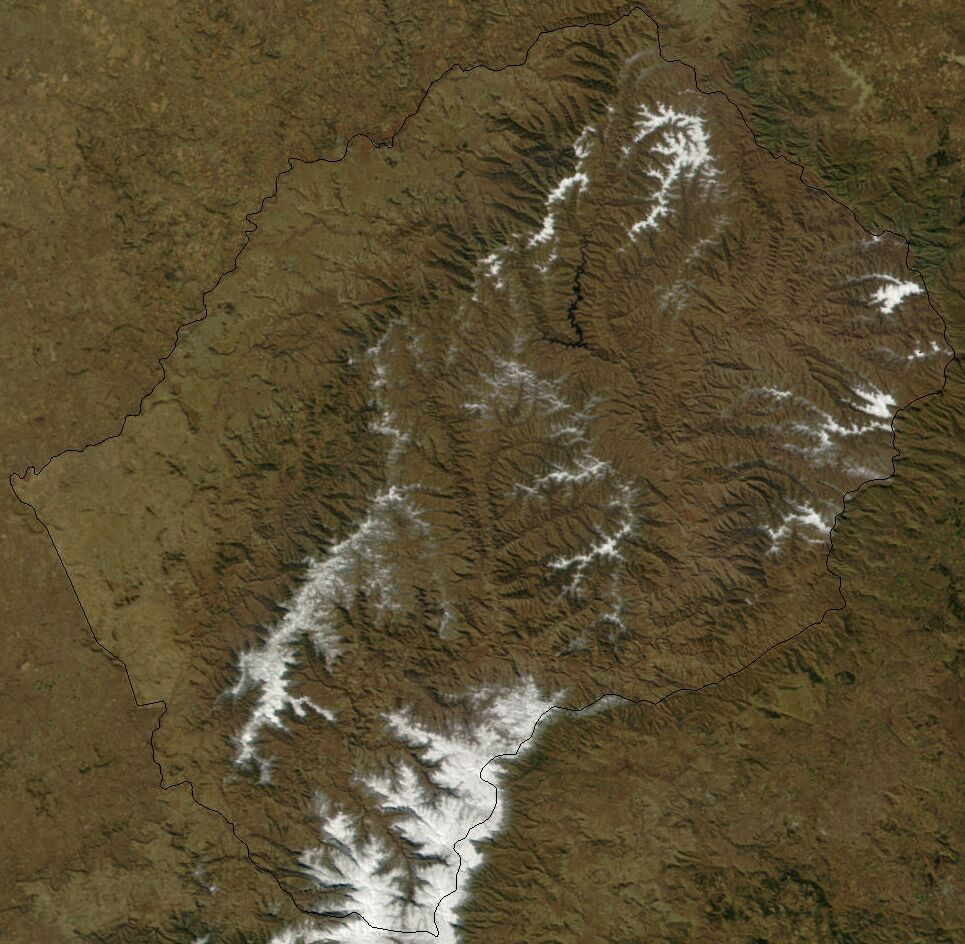
An enlargeable satellite image of Lesotho

- Climate of Lesotho
- Wildlife of Lesotho
  - Fauna of Lesotho
    - Birds of Lesotho
    - Mammals of Lesotho

==== Natural geographic features of Lesotho ====
- Glaciers in Lesotho: none
- Rivers of Lesotho
- World Heritage Sites in Lesotho: None

=== Regions of Lesotho ===
Regions of Lesotho

==== Ecoregions of Lesotho ====
List of ecoregions in Lesotho

==== Administrative divisions of Lesotho ====
Administrative divisions of Lesotho

- Districts of Lesotho

===== Districts of Lesotho =====
Districts of Lesotho

===== Municipalities of Lesotho =====
- Capital of Lesotho: Maseru
- Cities of Lesotho

=== Demography of Lesotho ===
Demographics of Lesotho

== Government and politics of Lesotho ==
Politics of Lesotho

- Form of government: Parliamentary representative democratic constitutional monarchy
- Capital of Lesotho: Maseru
- Elections in Lesotho
- Political parties in Lesotho

=== Branches of the government of Lesotho ===
Government of Lesotho

==== Executive branch of the government of Lesotho ====
- Head of state: King Letsie III,
- Head of government: Prime Minister of Lesotho,

==== Legislative branch of the government of Lesotho ====
- Parliament of Lesotho (bicameral)
  - Upper house: Senate of Lesotho
  - Lower house: National Assembly (Lesotho)

==== Judicial branch of the government of Lesotho ====
Court system of Lesotho

=== Foreign relations of Lesotho ===
Foreign relations of Lesotho

- Diplomatic missions in Lesotho
- Diplomatic missions of Lesotho

==== International organization membership ====
The Kingdom of Lesotho is a member of:

- African, Caribbean, and Pacific Group of States (ACP)
- African Development Bank Group (AfDB)
- African Union (AU)
- Commonwealth of Nations
- Food and Agriculture Organization (FAO)
- Group of 77 (G77)
- International Bank for Reconstruction and Development (IBRD)
- International Civil Aviation Organization (ICAO)
- International Criminal Court (ICCt)
- International Criminal Police Organization (Interpol)
- International Development Association (IDA)
- International Federation of Red Cross and Red Crescent Societies (IFRCS)
- International Finance Corporation (IFC)
- International Fund for Agricultural Development (IFAD)
- International Labour Organization (ILO)
- International Monetary Fund (IMF)
- International Olympic Committee (IOC)
- International Organization for Standardization (ISO) (subscriber)
- International Red Cross and Red Crescent Movement (ICRM)
- International Telecommunication Union (ITU)
- Inter-Parliamentary Union (IPU)
- Multilateral Investment Guarantee Agency (MIGA)
- Nonaligned Movement (NAM)
- Organisation for the Prohibition of Chemical Weapons (OPCW)
- Southern African Customs Union (SACU)
- Southern African Development Community (SADC)
- United Nations (UN)
- United Nations Conference on Trade and Development (UNCTAD)
- United Nations Educational, Scientific, and Cultural Organization (UNESCO)
- United Nations High Commissioner for Refugees (UNHCR)
- United Nations Industrial Development Organization (UNIDO)
- Universal Postal Union (UPU)
- World Customs Organization (WCO)
- World Federation of Trade Unions (WFTU)
- World Health Organization (WHO)
- World Intellectual Property Organization (WIPO)
- World Meteorological Organization (WMO)
- World Tourism Organization (UNWTO)
- World Trade Organization (WTO)

=== Law and order in Lesotho ===
Law of Lesotho

- Law Enforcement in Lesotho
- Constitution of Lesotho
- Human rights in Lesotho
  - Abortion in Lesotho
  - LGBT rights in Lesotho

=== Military of Lesotho ===
Military of Lesotho

- Command
  - Commander-in-chief:
- Forces
  - Army of Lesotho
  - Navy of Lesotho: None

=== Local government in Lesotho ===
Local government in Lesotho

== History of Lesotho ==
History of Lesotho

- Current events of Lesotho

== Culture of Lesotho ==
Culture of Lesotho

- Cuisine of Lesotho
- Languages of Lesotho
- National symbols of Lesotho
  - Coat of arms of Lesotho
  - Flag of Lesotho
  - National anthem of Lesotho
- People of Lesotho
- Public holidays in Lesotho
- Religion in Lesotho
  - Hinduism in Lesotho
  - Islam in Lesotho
  - Sikhism in Lesotho
- World Heritage Sites in Lesotho: None

=== Art in Lesotho ===
- Literature of Lesotho
- Music of Lesotho

=== Sports in Lesotho ===
Sports in Lesotho

- Football in Lesotho
- Lesotho at the Olympics
- Cycling In Lesotho

== Economy and infrastructure of Lesotho ==
Economy of Lesotho

- Economic rank, by nominal GDP (2025): 172nd (one hundred and seventy-second)
- Communications in Lesotho
  - Internet in Lesotho
- Companies of Lesotho
- Currency of Lesotho: Loti
  - ISO 4217: LSL
- Health care in Lesotho
- Mining in Lesotho
- Tourism in Lesotho
- Transport in Lesotho
- Transportation in Lesotho
  - Airports in Lesotho
  - Rail transport in Lesotho

== Education in Lesotho ==
Education in Lesotho

== See also ==
Lesotho

- List of international rankings
- List of Lesotho-related topics
- Member state of the Commonwealth of Nations
- Member state of the United Nations
- Outline of Africa
- Outline of geography
