= History of rail transport in Lesotho =

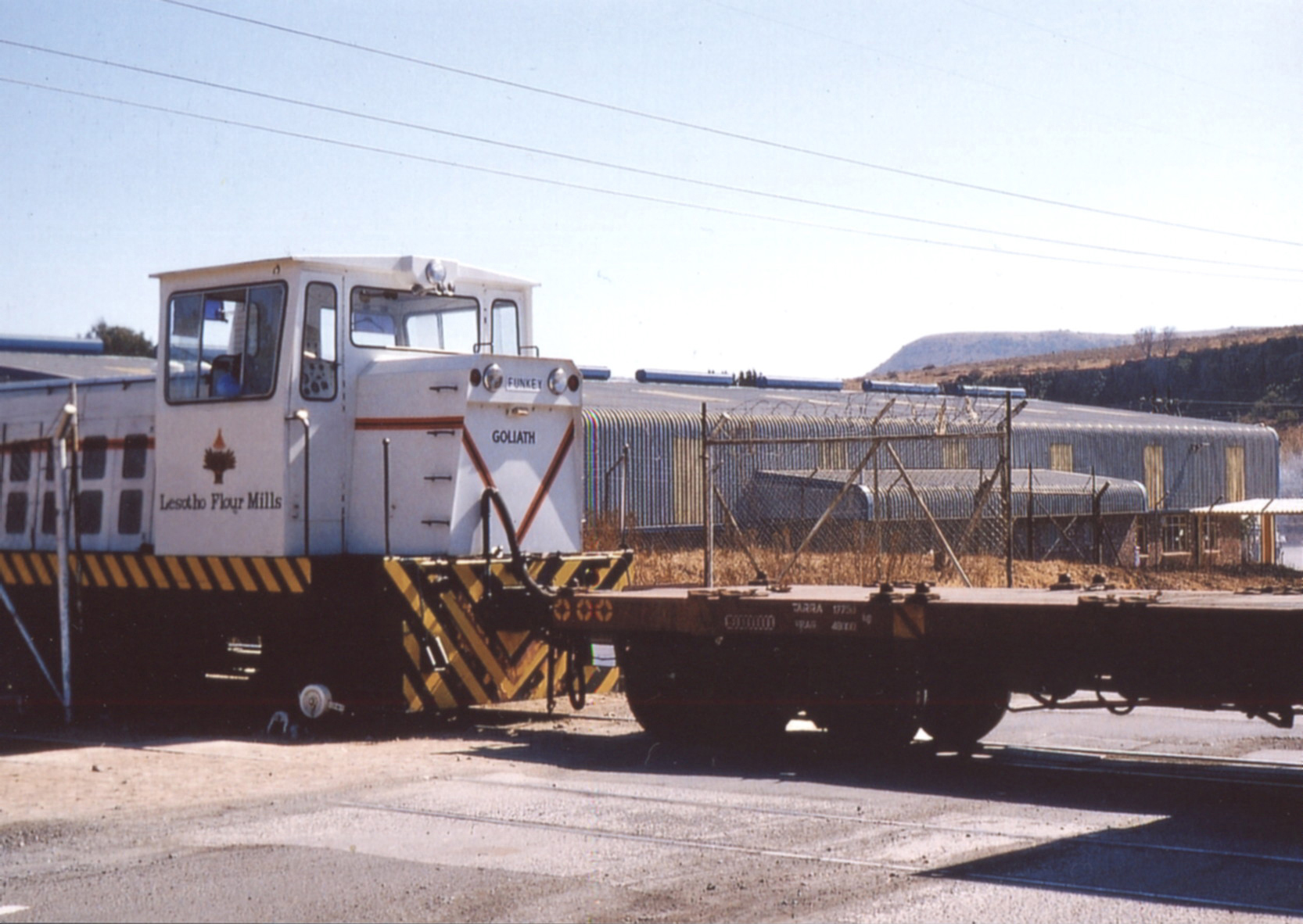
A Lesotho Flour Mills diesel locomotive with train, 1991

The history of rail transport in Lesotho began in 1905, when the landlocked nation of Lesotho was connected with the railway network of South Africa. The two nations have remained connected by a single railway line ever since.

== Beginnings ==
In 1902, the Central South African Railways began construction of the Bloemfontein–Bethlehem railway, which was intended to link the Orange River Colony (as it was then known) with the port of Durban. To make the line viable, it was desired that it should serve Maseru, the capital of Lesotho, but for the sake of economy it was decided to build the main line along a shorter route and connect Maseru by a branch line from Marseilles to Maseru, including a new bridge over the Caledon River (Sotho: Mohokare).

The new Maseru branch line was completed in October 1905 and opened on 18 December 1905. Within Lesotho, it was 1.6 kilometres (1.0 mi) long, from the Caledon River / Mohokare border bridge to the station at Maseru. Initially, both passenger and freight rail services were operated.

Lesotho has few natural resources and relies heavily on large-scale export of labour to South Africa. The opening of the railway facilitated that traffic. Previously, most Lesotho men engaged in migrant labour had walked from Lesotho to South African mines.

According to one source, the new railway "... proved a great boon to the community." However, another source claims that the construction of the railway and the demobilization of the auxiliary corps in South Africa were perceived by Lesotho's Basotho people as an attempt to place Lesotho under the South African colonies.

== More recent operations ==
In 1963, passenger service on the railway was suspended. Five years later, it was resumed. During the 1970s, there was a substantial increase in wages at the mines, and this led to a growth in border passenger traffic, as workers were able to afford to come home more frequently. However, by that time road travel had become the preferred method of cross-border transport. In 1985, passenger rail service was suspended for a second time, and there has been no regular passenger service since 1989.

Freight trains have continued to run on the railway, carrying mainly cement, maize, fuel and freight containers. As of 2011, there were two freight trains every day, making up about one third of Lesotho’s international trade in bulk goods. Rail freight infrastructure in Lesotho included a container handling facility and a bulk grain handling facility in the Maseru industrial sites. These facilities were owned by the government and leased to the South African rail company, Spoornet, which was the railway's operator.

== See also ==
- History of rail transport
- History of Lesotho
- Rail transport in Lesotho
- Maseru branch line
