= Telecommunications in Lesotho =

Telecommunications in Lesotho include radio, television, print and online newspapers, fixed and mobile telephones, and the Internet.

== Radio ==
- Radio stations: 2 state-owned radio stations; government controls most private broadcast media; transmissions of multiple international broadcasters are available (2008).
- Radio stations in Lesotho:
  - Radio Lesotho 1050AM.
  - Ultimate 950AM.
  - Radio Lesotho 93.3FM, Maseru only.
  - People's Choice (PCFM) 95.6FM, Maseru only.
  - Radio France International (RFI) 95.4FM, Maseru only.
  - Thaha-Khube 97.1FM, Maseru only.
  - Harvest 98.8FM, Maseru only.
  - Moafrica 99.3FM, Maseru only.
  - Ultimate 99.8FM, Maseru only.
  - Kereke Evangel, 102FM.
  - Catholic radio 103.3FM.
  - Jeso KE Karabo 105.2FM, Maseru only.
  - Joy 106.9FM, Maseru only.
  - Soul Radio Internet based Radio

== Television ==
- Television stations: 1 state-owned TV station; government controls most private broadcast media; satellite TV subscription service available; transmissions of multiple international broadcasters are available (2008).
- TV stations in Lesotho:"Lesotho". Infoplease. Sandbox Learning Family.
  - Lesotho Television is a state owned tv network which is operated by Lesotho National Broadcasting Services or LNBS in short, it caters for Mountain Kingdom from Current affairs, News, Culture, Reality shows, it caters in both official languages in Lesotho which is Sesotho or English (LTV 292 on DStv).

== Newspapers ==
- Main newspapers in Lesotho:
  - Public Eye newspaper, Public Eye website.
  - Lesotho Times, Lesotho Times website.
  - Sunday Express,
  - Informative News, Informative News website.
  - AllAfrica.com
  - Finite Magazine
  - LENA (Lesotho News Agency)
  - The Post

== Telephones ==
- Calling code +266
- International call prefix: 00
- Main lines: 43,100 lines in use, 168th in the world (2012).
- Mobile cellular: 1.3 million lines, 153rd in the world (2012).
- Telephone system: Rudimentary system consisting of a modest number of landlines, a small microwave radio relay system, and a small radiotelephone communication system; privatized in 2001, Telecom Lesotho was tasked with providing an additional 50,000 fixed-line connections within five years, a target not met; mobile-cellular service dominates the market and is expanding with a subscribership of roughly 65 per 100 persons in 2011; rural services are scant (2011).
- Satellite earth station: 1 Intelsat (Atlantic Ocean) (2011).

=== Telecommunications providers ===
Vodacom Lesotho started operating in 1996 with the Government of Lesotho as a shareholder through its stake in Lesotho Telecommunications Corporation. When the Government of Lesotho began its privatisation process in 1999, it invited bids for this share in Vodacom Lesotho. In July 2000, Sekha-Metsi Consortium, a group of local business people and public figures, was announced as the successful bidder. Sekha-Metsi now holds a 12% share in Vodacom Lesotho with the remaining share held by Vodacom Group. In 2008 Vodacom Lesotho introduced its new partnership with Vodafone.

Econet Telecom Lesotho is part of the Econet Wireless group and operates as a stand-alone entity with full local board and management control. It is the first African mobile service operator to use ForgetMeNot Africa's eTXT service to enable their customer base to send and receive email via any mobile capable of a simple SMS.

== Internet ==
- Top-level domain: .ls
- Internet users: 88,602 users, 170th in the world; 4.6% of the population, 189th in the world (2012).
- 27.93 % of households with internet access as of 2017
- Fixed broadband: 2,529 subscriptions, 169th in the world; 0.1% of the population, 163rd in the world (2012).
- Wireless broadband: Unknown (2012).
- Internet hosts: 11,030 hosts, 131st in the world (2012).
- IPv4: 40,448 addresses allocated, less than 0.05% of the world total, 21.0 addresses per 1000 people (2012).
- Internet service providers: 4 ISPs (2013).

=== Internet censorship and surveillance ===
There are no government restrictions on access to the Internet or credible reports that the government monitors e-mail or Internet chat rooms without judicial oversight. The Internet is not widely available and almost nonexistent in rural areas due to the lack of communications infrastructure and high cost of access.

The constitution and law provide for freedom of speech, so long as they do not interfere with "defense, public safety, public order, public morality, or public health". The government generally respects this right. An independent press, effective judiciary, and functioning democratic political system combine generally to promote freedom of the press; however, harassment of journalists and self-censorship persist. The law prohibits expressions of hatred or contempt for any person because of the person’s race, ethnic affiliation, gender, disability, or color.

== See also ==
- Lesotho Amateur Radio Society
