= Maseru branch line =

Railway line in Lesotho and South Africa

Map of the railway line from Bloemfontein to Maseru

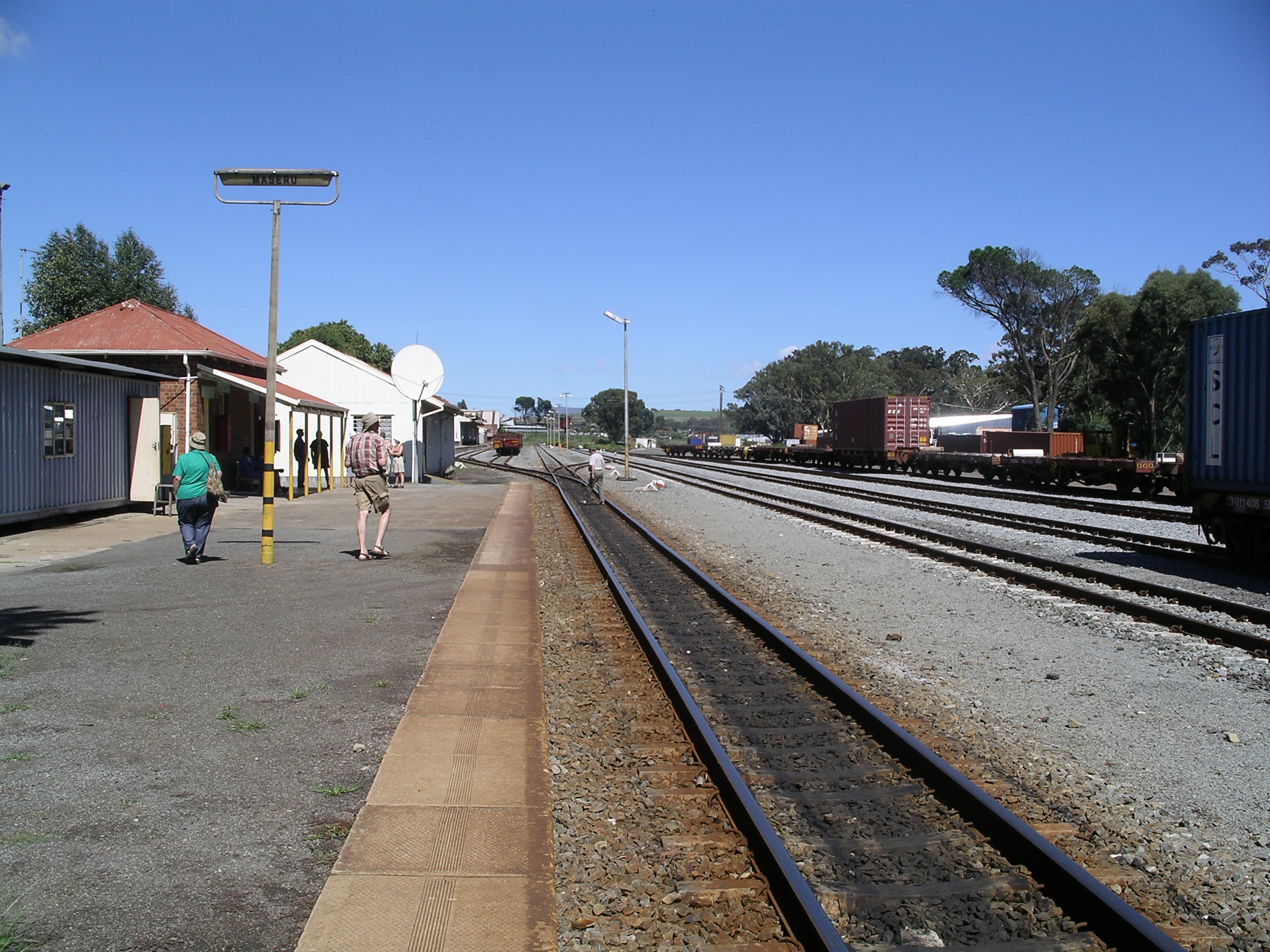
Maseru Station

The line on the South African side of the border crossing

The Maseru branch line is a 26-kilometre (16 mi) railway line that connects Maseru, the capital of Lesotho, to the railway network of South Africa. The line is not electrified.

== Overview ==
It branches from the Bloemfontein–Bethlehem line at Marseilles, Free State, and runs in a south-easterly direction for 24 kilometres (15 mi) to the Caledon River. After crossing the river, which serves as the border with Lesotho, the line runs for 1.6 kilometres (1.0 mi) through an industrial area of Maseru, serving the city's station and various factories and depots. The line is owned by Transnet Freight Rail of South Africa; it has freight service but no regular passenger trains.

Construction on the Bloemfontein–Bethlehem railway line, intended to link the Orange River Colony (as it was then known) with the port of Durban, began in 1902 under the direction of the Central South African Railways. By June 1904 it was open from Bloemfontein as far as Modderpoort. In order to make the line viable, it was desired that it should serve Maseru, but for the sake of economy it was decided to build the main line along a shorter route and connect Maseru by a branch line. The line from Marseilles to Maseru, including a new bridge over the Caledon River, was opened on 18 December 1905.

== See also ==
- History of rail transport in Lesotho
- Rail transport in Lesotho
