= Tourism in Lesotho =

Tourism in Lesotho is a growing industry in the country.

In 2013, travel and tourism contributed about 5.5% to the GDP of Lesotho, with this proportion expected to increase to 6.1% of GDP by 2024. The sector employed 25,000 people in 2013, 4.6% of total national employment.

Residents of South Africa, which completely surrounds Lesotho, make up over 90% of the visitors to the country. Many trips are to visit friends and family.

Various outdoor pursuits form the most popular leisure activities for tourists in the country. The mountainous terrain draws tourists for hiking, pony trekking and skiing, as well as the use of four-wheel drive trails. The Afriski ski resort operates during the winter months.

The most used entry-points into Lesotho include Moshoeshoe I International Airport and the land border crossing points of Maseru and Maputsoe.

Tourism in the country is overseen by the Ministry of Tourism, Environment & Culture, based in the capital, Maseru.

== Arrivals by country ==
Most visitors arriving to Lesotho were from the following countries of nationality:

| Country | 2017 | 2016 | 2015 | 2014 |
|---|---|---|---|---|
| South Africa | 1,009,856 | 1,081,227 | 970,292 | 968,742 |
| Zimbabwe | 20,991 | 20,835 | 20,995 | 20,523 |
| Netherlands | 9,275 | 7,856 | 6,223 | 4,454 |
| Germany | 8,913 | 7,955 | 5,951 | 3,746 |
| United States | 8,589 | 10,026 | 9,694 | 8,798 |
| China | 7,830 | 6,878 | 8,095 | 9,630 |
| Botswana | 7,513 | 8,972 | 6,712 | 6,942 |
| United Kingdom | 5,554 | 4,970 | 6,436 | 6,128 |
| India | 4,745 | 4,389 | 3,639 | 4,619 |
| Eswatini | 3,930 | 5,006 | 4,627 | 3,716 |
| Total | 1,137,166 | 1,196,214 | 1,082,403 | 1,078,510 |
