= Telephone numbers in Lesotho =

- Country: Lesotho
- Continent: Africa
- Numbering plan type: Closed
- NSN length: 8
- Format: XX XXX XXX
- Country code: +266
- International access: 00
- Long-distance: n/a

The following are the telephone numbers in Lesotho. Lesotho was allocated the country code +266 by the International Telecommunication Union in the late 1960s. Phone numbers in are eight digits long, the first two digits being the area code. Previously, Lesotho had area codes, which were integrated into the South African telephone numbering plan, and calls could be made from South Africa using the regional code 050. For example, to call a number in Maseru, subscribers would dial 0501, while to call a number in Mazenod, they would dial 05022. From the rest of the world, subscribers would dial +266 1.

== Area codes ==
- 22,28 Maseru Reserved for fixed
- 56,57,58,59,63, Reserved for cellular use
- 27,52 Reserved for fixed mobile (corporated direct)
- 6x Reserved for cellular use

== Proposed use for international SMS ==
There had been some interest in using part of this country's numbering scheme to run international SMS promotions or competitions, as when +CNN is spelt out on an E.161 standard telephone keypad, it translates to +266. CNN's degree of interest in the idea was unknown at the time.
