= People's Charter Movement =

Political party in Lesotho

The People's Charter Movement (PCM) is a political organisation in Lesotho that advocates for the annexation of the Kingdom of Lesotho into the Republic of South Africa.

== Objectives ==
Lesotho is an enclaved country, entirely surrounded by South Africa. The country has suffered from numerous crises recently. Nearly a quarter of the population tests positive for HIV, and the country has also faced high unemployment, economic collapse, a weak currency and poor travel documents restricting movement. Among other things, these crises have motivated calls for increased integration with the surrounding South Africa.

The exact objectives of the PCM are not entirely clear, as it has at times advocated for outright annexation while at other times calling for the two governments "to embark on discussions that could ultimately result in a special type relationship between the two countries--be it a union, a federation or a unified state". The PCM advocates merger into South Africa owing to the desperate economic conditions in Lesotho, aggravated by an AIDS crisis that has affected more than 400,000 people. While the PCM advocates the dissolution of Lesotho as a sovereign state, it argues for retention of autonomy and the status of the King of Lesotho.

== History ==
In May 2010, the Charter Movement delivered a petition with 30,000 signatures to the South African High Commission requesting integration. South Africa's home affairs spokesman Ronnie Mamoepa rejected the idea that Lesotho should be treated as a special case. "It is a sovereign country like South Africa. We sent envoys to our neighbours – Botswana, Zimbabwe, Swaziland and Lesotho – before we enforced the passport rule. When you travel from Britain to South Africa, don't you expect to use a passport?"
