= Wildlife of Lesotho =

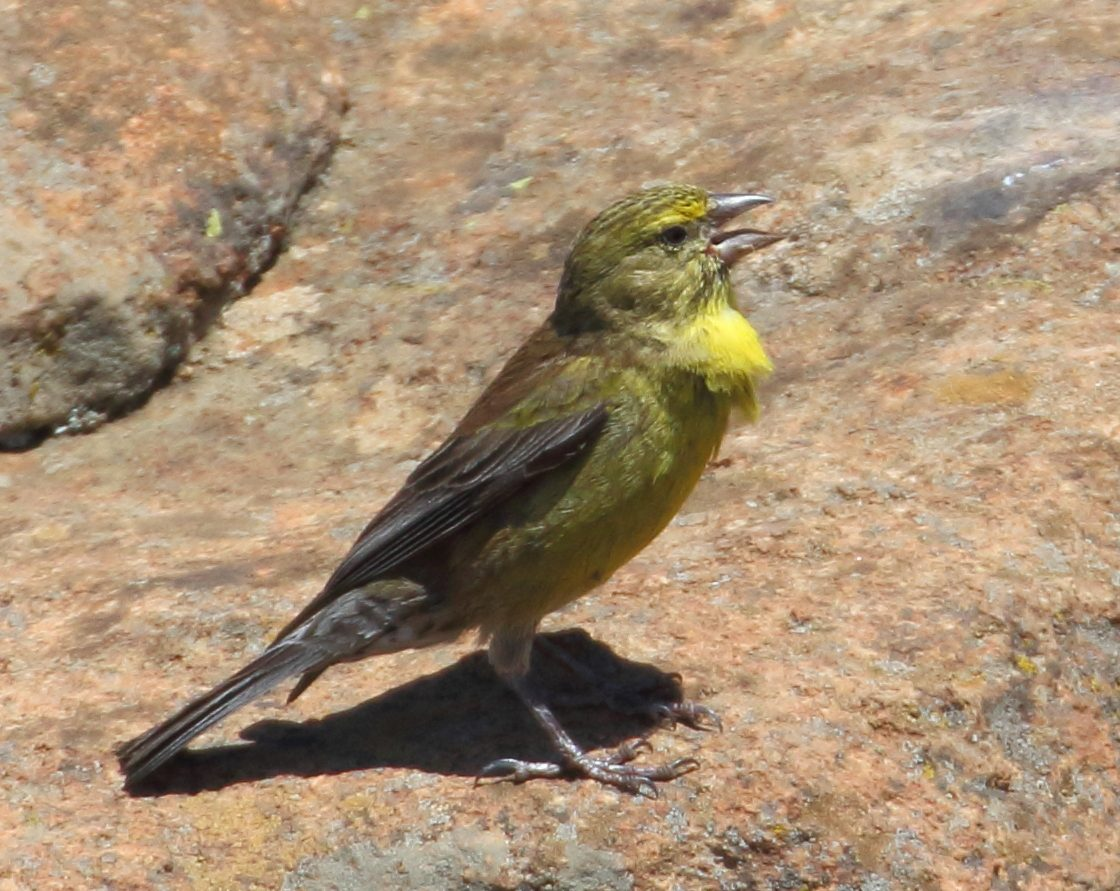
Drakensberg siskin

The wildlife of Lesotho is composed of its flora and fauna. Lesotho has 60 species of mammals and 339 species of birds.

== Fauna ==
=== Mammals ===
- African leopard
- South African cheetah

== Flora ==
Grass is the natural vegetation in Lesotho. The high plateau is covered with montane or subalpine grassland. Red oat grass forms a dry carpet in much of the Drakensberg foothill region.

== Sources ==
- Kovtunovich, V. & Ustjuzhanin, P. 2011. On the fauna of the plume moths (Lepidoptera: Pterophoridae) of Lesotho. African Invertebrates 52 (1): 167-175.
- "The IUCN Red List of Threatened Species: Mammals of Lesotho". IUCN. 2001.
- "Mammal Species of the World". Smithsonian National Museum of Natural History. 2005. Archived from the original on 27 April 2007.
- "Animal Diversity Web". University of Michigan Museum of Zoology. 1995–2006.
- Lepage, Denis. "Checklist of birds of Lesotho". Bird Checklists of the World. Avibase.
- Clements, James F. (2000). Birds of the World: a Checklist. Cornell University Press. p. 880. ISBN 0-934797-16-1.
