= Sport in Lesotho =

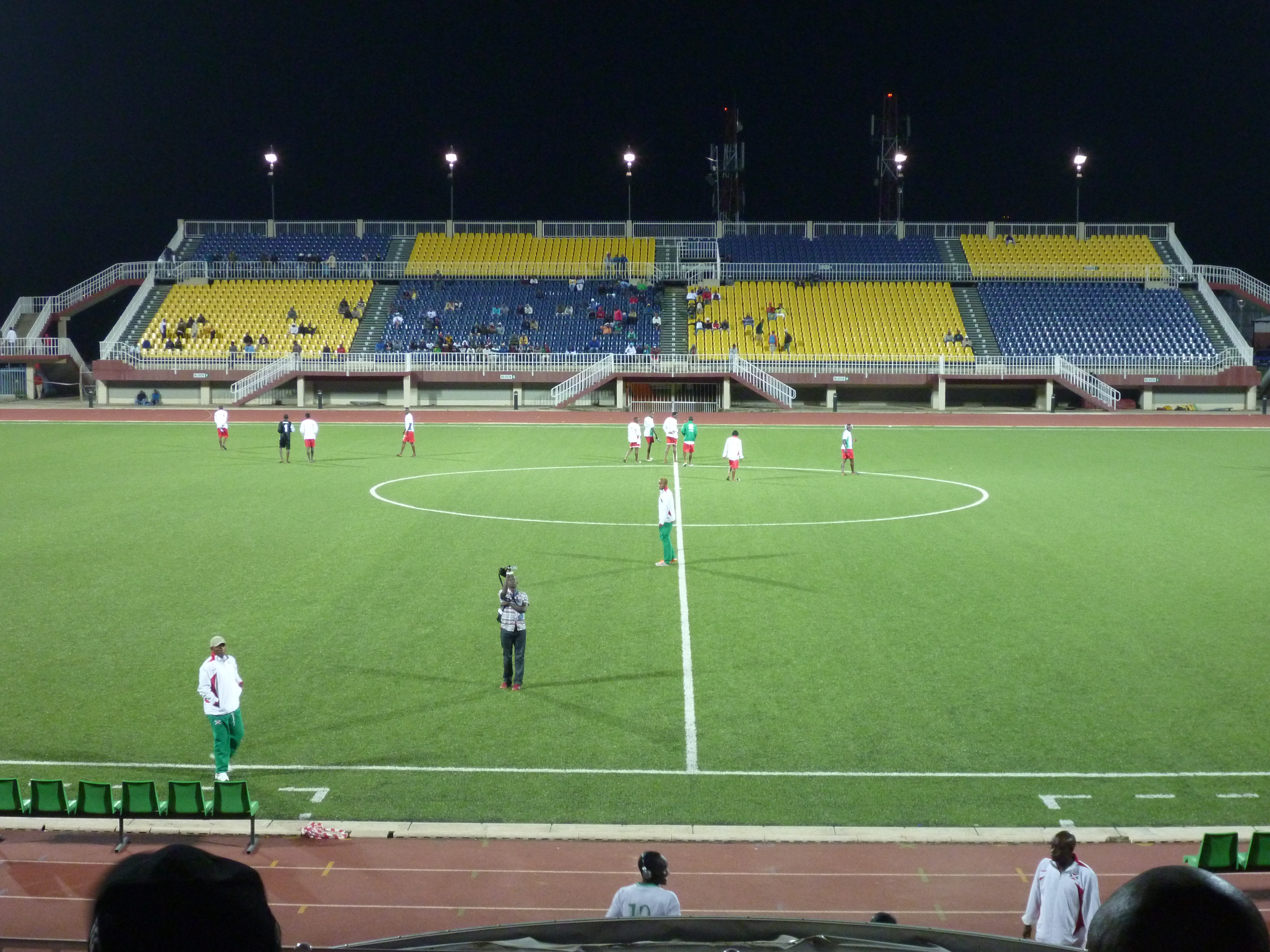
Setsoto Stadium

Sports form a part of the culture of Lesotho. Football is the most popular sport in the country.

== Olympics ==
Lesotho first participated at the Olympic Games in 1972.

== By sport ==
=== Cricket ===
The Lesotho national cricket team is an associate member of the ICC.

=== Football ===
Football is the most popular sport in the country. The national team, governed by the Lesotho Football Association represents Lesotho in various competitions, however, it has never qualified for the FIFA World Cup. The Lesotho Premier League is the top league of the country.
