= International rankings of Lesotho =

The Kingdom of Lesotho, a small country, characterized by dire poverty, economic inequality and political instability, ranks quite low in many measures.

Following are some international rankings of Lesotho.

== Geography ==
Measure	Rank	Source	Value
Land area, sq km	137	World Bank	30360
Population density, Persons per sq km	142	Countries of the World	72.83

== Population ==
Measure	Rank	Source	Value
Midyear Population	147	United States Census Bureau International Database	2,244,643
Fertility rate	52	World Bank	2.7
Total birth rate	48	Countries of the World	23.00 births/1,000 population
Life expectancy at birth	221	CIA World Factbook	60.2 years
Infant mortality	24	World Health Organization	29.4 deaths/1,000 live births

== Economy ==
Measure	Rank	Source	Value
Real GDP (purchasing power parity)	173	CIA World Factbook	$6.166 billion (2024 est.)
Current account balance	164	Countries of the World	$90.886 million
Median income	124	World Population Review	$1,157
Gini coefficient of economic inequality	24	World Bank	44.9
Budget revenues	164	Countries of the World	$ 1.054 billion

== Technological ==
Organization	Survey	Ranking
World Intellectual Property Organization	Global Innovation Index, 2026	128 out of 139
