= Nixonite =

General
- Category: Minerals
- Formula: Na_{2}Ti_{6}O_{13}
- IMA symbol: Nix
- Crystal system: Monoclinic

Identification
- Mohs scale hardness: 5–6
- Specific gravity: 3.51
- Density: 3.51(1) g/cm^{3}

Nixonite is a mineral named after Professor Peter H. Nixon (1935–2025). It is chemically related to freudenbergite and loparite-(Ce).

== Bibliography ==
- "Nixonite: Mineral information, data and localities". Mindat.org.
