= Marseilles, Free State =

Marseilles
- Location within Free State (South African province) Location within South Africa
- Coordinates: 29.1811°S 27.2947°E
- Country: South Africa
- Province: Free State
- District: Thabo Mofutsanyane
- Municipality: Mantsopa
- Time zone: UTC+2 (SAST)
- Postal code (street): 9747
- PO box: 9747

Marseilles is a town in Free State, South Africa. It is infrequently served by a station of the South African Railways.

The town is located 113 km east of Bloemfontein and 24 km west of Ladybrand. It was named after the port city of Marseille in France (historically spelt Marseilles in English).

== See also ==
- Railway stations in Lesotho
