= Rail transport in Lesotho =

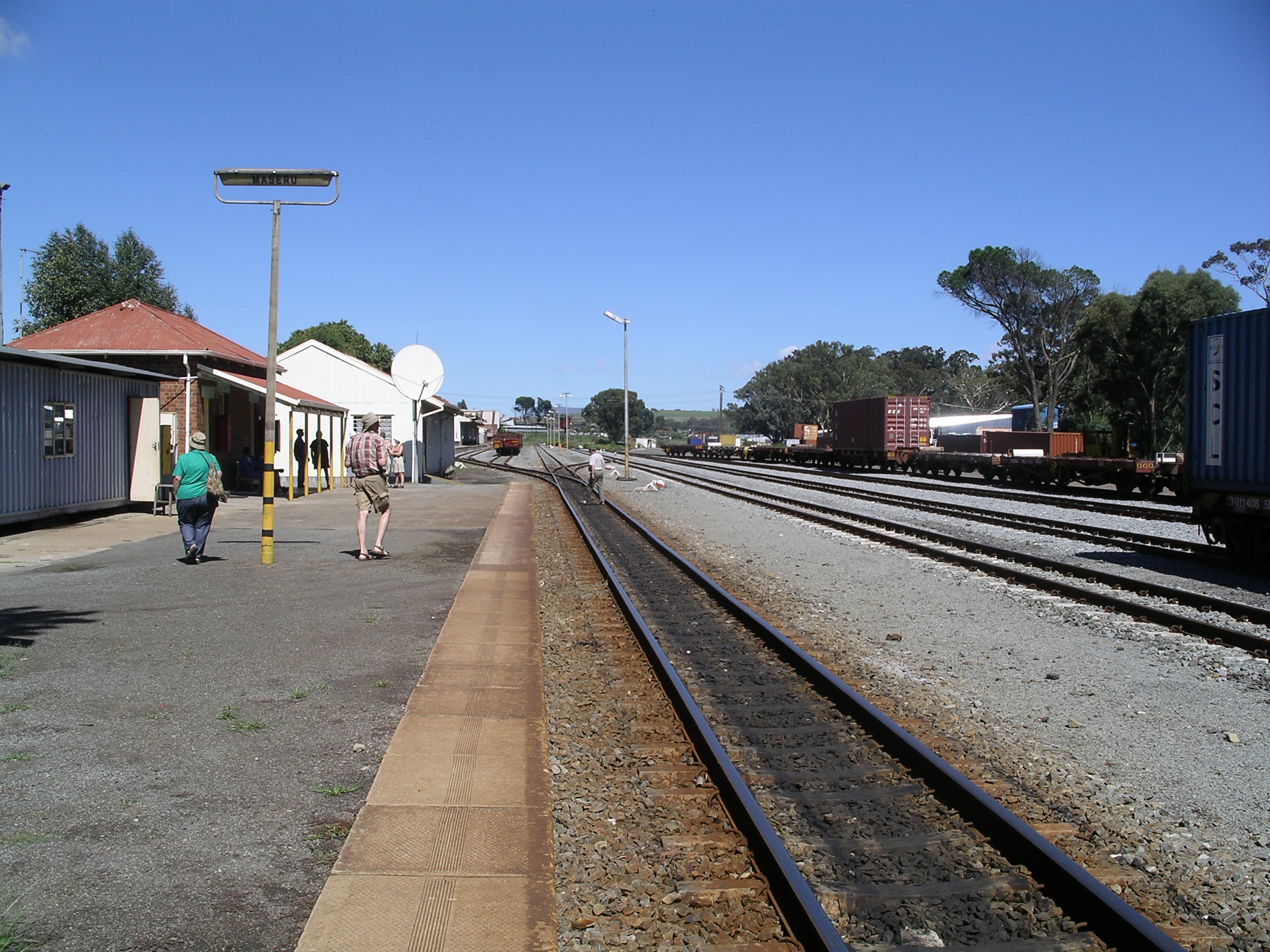
Maseru station

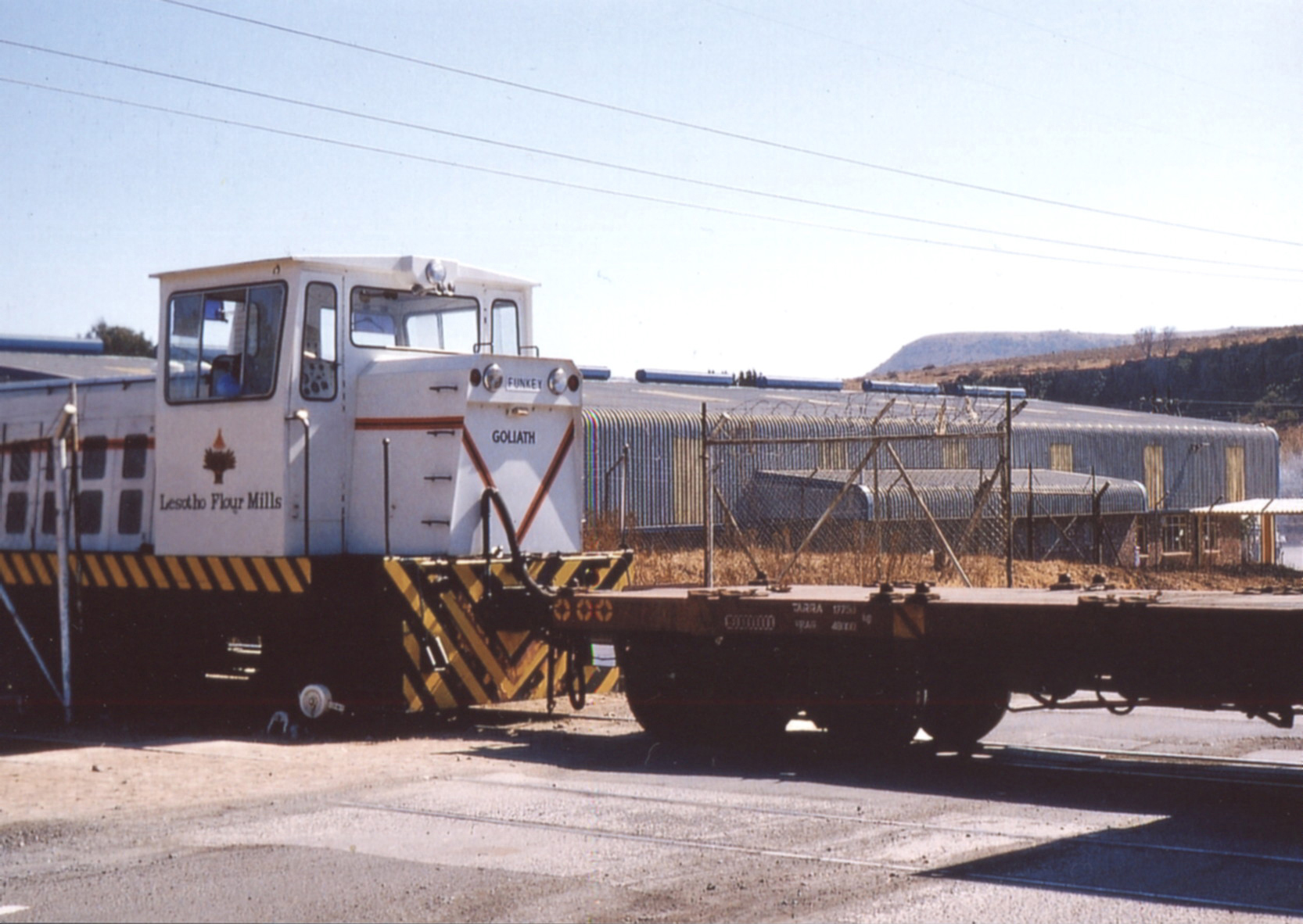
Diesel engine with goods wagon of Lesotho Flour Mills at Maseru station

The nation of Lesotho has a single railway station, located in the capital city Maseru. It is the terminus of the Maseru branch line, which connects to the railway network of South Africa.

== Overview ==
The length of the line within Lesotho, from the border bridge over the Mohokare River to the station, is 1.6 kilometres (1.0 mi). It opened on 18 December 1905. The distance by rail from Maseru to the main line at Bloemfontein is 137 kilometres (85 mi).

As of 2008, there have been talks of building new railways to connect Lesotho to Durban and Port Elizabeth.

== History ==
Lesotho was connected with the railway network of South Africa in 1905. The two nations have remained connected by a single railway line ever since.

== See also ==
- Transport in Lesotho
- Rail transport in South Africa
