= .ls =

Internet country code top-level domain for Lesotho

- Introduced: 13 January 1993
- TLD type: Country code top-level domain
- Status: Active
- Registry: Lesotho Network Information Centre
- Sponsor: Lesotho Communications Authority
- Intended use: Entities connected with Lesotho
- Actual use: Used mainly in Lesotho; sees rare use as a domain hack
- Structure: New registrations are taken on second and third level, below one of the existing second-level labels
- Documents: Registration policies
- Dispute policies: UDRP
- Registry website: www.nic.ls

.ls is the Internet country code top-level domain (ccTLD) for Lesotho.

== Second-level domains ==
Registration to .ls domains are provided through accredited registrars.

There are also registrations on third level as shown below.

Second-level domains within .ls
Domain	Intended purpose
.ac.ls	Academic or educational organisations
.co.ls	Commercial entities, companies
.gov.ls	Government departments; can only be registered through the Ministry of Communications, Science and Technology
.net.ls	Network infrastructure
.nul.ls	National University of Lesotho: used only by the university and can be registered by them only
.org.ls	Non-commercial entities
.sc.ls	Primary and High schools

== History ==
The .ls domain was established and first delegated on 13 January 1993, with the National University of Lesotho as the sponsoring authority. Initially, Rhodes University acted as the registry and hosted the primary name server, a situation that continued until September 2012.

In April 2012, the sponsoring authority changed from the National University of Lesotho to the Lesotho Communications Authority, the national communications regulator, in line with the newly promulgated Communications Act (No. 4 of 2012). In January 2016, a non-profit company, the Lesotho Network Information Centre (LsNIC) was established to take over registry operations. Re-delegation of the zone was completed by IANA in March 2017.
