= List of National Assembly members of the 11th Parliament of Lesotho =

This is a list of members of the National Assembly of Lesotho elected in 2022 general election, for the term 2022–2027.

== Current composition ==
The current composition of the National Assembly, as of 18 April 2023:

Party	Constituency seats	PR seats	Total
RFP	57	0	57
DC	18	8	26
ABC	0	8	8
BAP	0	6	6
AD	2	2	4
MEC	1	3	4
LCD	0	3	3
SR	1	1	2
BNP	0	2	2
PFD	0	1	1
BCM	0	1	1
MPS	0	1	1
NIP	1	0	1
HOPE	0	1	1
United for Change	0	1	1
BPP	0	1	1
LPC	0	1	1
Total	80	40	120

== Constituency MPs ==
#	Constituency	Name	Party
1	Mechachane	Jane Lekunya	Democratic Congress
2	Hololo	Lejone Mpotjoane	Revolution for Prosperity
3	Motete	Teboho Mojapela	Socialist Revolutionaries
4	Qalo	Dada Jooma	Revolution for Prosperity
5	Butha-Buthe	Karabo Pholosa	Revolution for Prosperity
6	Maliba-Matso	Francis Mokoto Hloaele	Alliance of Democrats
7	Mphosong	'Mamokete Ntšekhe	Revolution for Prosperity
8	Thaba-Phatsoa	Thabo Maretlane	Revolution for Prosperity
9	Mahobong	Nkhethoa Seetsa	Revolution for Prosperity
10	Pela Ts'oeu	'Mope Khati	Revolution for Prosperity
11	Matlakeng	Mahali Phamotse	Revolution for Prosperity
12	Leribe	Khotso Motseki	Revolution for Prosperity
13	Hlotse	Rethabile Nalane	Revolution for Prosperity
14	Tsikoane	Malefane Mabote	Revolution for Prosperity
15	Maputsoe	Mputi Mputi	Revolution for Prosperity
16	Moselinyane	Tommy Tayob	Revolution for Prosperity
17	Peka	Mohopoli Isaac Monokoane	Revolution for Prosperity
18	Kolonyana	Mahlathene Lempe	Revolution for Prosperity
19	Mosalemane	Ntoi Rapapa	Alliance of Democrats
20	'Makhoroana	Tšitso Cheba	Democratic Congress
21	Bela-Bela	Teboho Malataliana	Revolution for Prosperity
22	Malimong	Lephoi Makara	Revolution for Prosperity
23	Khafung	Chopho Lekholoane	Revolution for Prosperity
24	Teya-Teyaneng	Lebona Lephema	Revolution for Prosperity
25	Tsoana-Makhulo	Teboho Notsi	Revolution for Prosperity
26	Thuathe	Voeswa Tsheka	Revolution for Prosperity
27	Mokhethoaneng	Mokhothu Makhalanyane	Revolution for Prosperity
28	Khubetsoana	Lekhotsa Mafatle	Revolution for Prosperity
29	Mabote	Lethole Lethole	Revolution for Prosperity
30	Motimposo	Makatleho Motsoasele	Revolution for Prosperity
31	Majoe-Lits'oene	Evaristus Ramakatsa	Revolution for Prosperity
32	Stadium Area	Mampho Tjabane	Revolution for Prosperity
33	Maseru	Nthomeng Majara	Revolution for Prosperity
34	Thetsane	Nthati Moorosi	Revolution for Prosperity
35	Tsolo	Mathiba Malothoane	Revolution for Prosperity
36	Likotsi	Itumeleng Rantsho	Revolution for Prosperity
37	Qoaling	Mohlomi Moleko	Revolution for Prosperity
38	Lithoteng	Kobeli Letlailana	Revolution for Prosperity
39	Abia	Thuso Jacob Makhalanyane	Revolution for Prosperity
40	Lithabaneng	Mokhethi Shelile	Revolution for Prosperity
41	Matala	Tseliso Moroke	Revolution for Prosperity
42	Thaba-Bosiu	Malebaleba Joseph	Revolution for Prosperity
43	Machache	Motheo Ralitapole	Revolution for Prosperity
44	Thaba-Putsoa	Lebohang Monaheng	Democratic Congress
45	Maama	Pitso Lesaoana	Revolution for Prosperity
46	Koro-Koro	Abinyane Mahatanya	Revolution for Prosperity
47	Qeme	Sello Hakane	Revolution for Prosperity
48	Rothe	Lebohang Simon Phohleli	Revolution for Prosperity
49	Matsieng	Makotoko Moshe	Revolution for Prosperity
50	Makhaleng	Mootsi Lehata	Democratic Congress
51	Maletsunyane	Peiso Kelane	Democratic Congress
52	Thaba-Phechela	Mohau Hlalele	Democratic Congress
53	Phoqoane	Matankiso Tekane	Revolution for Prosperity
54	Matelile	Maimane Maphathe	Democratic Congress
55	Maliepetsane	Lehlohonolo Hlapisi	Democratic Congress
56	Thabana-Morena	Selibe Mochoboroane	Movement for Economic Change
57	Qalabane	Retšelisitsoe Matlanyane	Revolution for Prosperity
58	Mafeteng	Moeketsi Motsoane	Revolution for Prosperity
59	Taung	Matiisetso Elizaberth Matsie	Democratic Congress
60	Mpharane	Nku Mohlalisi	Revolution for Prosperity
61	Mohale's Hoek	Ezekiel Mdlokovana	Revolution for Prosperity
62	Mekaling	Thabiso Lekitla	Democratic Congress
63	Mekaling	Marefuoe Alice Muso	Democratic Congress
64	Hloahloeng	Katleho Mabeleng	Democratic Congress
65	Moyeni	Thabo Mofosi	Revolution for Prosperity
66	Sempe	Lehlohonolo Mosoang	National Independent Party
67	Mt. Moorosi	Thuso Mosetlolo	Revolution for Prosperity
68	Qhoali	Mathibeli Mokhothu	Democratic Congress
69	Qacha's Nek	Mohlahlobo Busa	Democratic Congress
70	Lebakeng	Letsekang Moloi	Democratic Congress
71	Tsoelike	Ts'eliso Nkoefoshe	Democratic Congress
72	Mantsonyane	Sam Matekane	Revolution for Prosperity
73	Thaba-Moea	Lejone Puseletso	Revolution for Prosperity
74	Thaba-Tseka	Mamamello Holomo	Revolution for Prosperity
75	Semena	John Mosotho	Democratic Congress
76	Mashai	Sekhele Mosebetsane	Revolution for Prosperity
77	Malingoaneng	Monethi Ramakalima	Revolution for Prosperity
78	Malingoaneng	Bolala Khesa	Revolution for Prosperity
79	Mokhotlong	Letsema Adonts'i	Revolution for Prosperity
80	Bobatsi	Bataung Makhakhe	Democratic Congress

== Proportional representation MPs ==
Name	Party
Nkaku Kabi	All Basotho Convention
Pinki Manamolela	All Basotho Convention
Lebohang Hlaele	All Basotho Convention
Agatha Tsoanamatsie	All Basotho Convention
Rantsitile Ramone	All Basotho Convention
Maleleka Malakane	All Basotho Convention
Montoeli Masoetsa	All Basotho Convention
Mathabo Seatile	All Basotho Convention
Monyane Moleleki	Alliance of Democrats
Maboiketlo Maliehe	Alliance of Democrats
Nqosa Mahao	Basotho Action Party
Mamoipone Senauoane	Basotho Action Party
Motlatsi Maqelepo	Basotho Action Party
Hilda van Rooyen	Basotho Action Party
Tello Kibane	Basotho Action Party
Manyaneso Taole	Basotho Action Party
Tšepo Lipholo	Basotho Covenant Movement
Machesetsa Mofomobe	Basotho National Party
Masetota Leshota	Basotho National Party
Masetota Leshota	Basotho Patriotic Party
Mabafokeng Mpobole	Democratic Congress
Maoshoa Mpeoa	Democratic Congress
Mamookho Phiri	Democratic Congress
Ramosa Ramaisa	Democratic Congress
Makhahliso Mosoeunyane	Democratic Congress
Hlalele Letšaba	Democratic Congress
Machabana Lemphane Letsie	HOPE – Mphatlalatsane
Mothetjoa Metsing	Lesotho Congress for Democracy
Mamello Phooko	Lesotho Congress for Democracy
Tšeliso Mokhosi	Lesotho Congress for Democracy
Paul Masiu	Lesotho People's Congress
Tšepang Mosena	Movement for Economic Change
Napo Moshoeshoe	Movement for Economic Change
Mantoetsi Mohatonyana	Movement for Economic Change
Remaketse Sehlabaka	Mpulule Political Summit
Lekhetho Rakuoane	Popular Front for Democracy
Mamarame Matela	Socialist Revolutionaries
Mohlominyane Tota	United for Change

== 2023 reallocation of seats ==
In April 2023, the Independent Electoral Commission won a case in the Lesotho High Court to change the seat allocation after it had told the court that it had erroneously given seats to two opposition parties at the election. The ruling resulted in the Democratic Congress losing three proportional representation seats, while the Alliance of Democrats lost one PR seat; the Basotho National Party gained an additional PR seat, while the Lesotho People's Congress, United for Change, and the Basotho Patriotic Party all gained one seat each, which allowed the three parties to enter the National Assembly.
