= List of political parties in Lesotho =

This is a list of political parties in Lesotho.

== Parties ==
=== Parliamentary parties ===
Party	Abbr.	Leader	Political position	Ideology	MPs
Revolution for Prosperity; Thalaboliba ea Ntlafatso	RFP	Sam Matekane	Centre	Liberalism; Social liberalism	57 / 120
Democratic Congress	DC	Mathibeli Mokhothu	Centre-left	Pan-Africanism; Social democracy	29 / 120
All Basotho Convention; Kobo-tata ea Basotho	ABC	Nkaku Kabi	Centre	Liberalism	8 / 120
Basotho Action Party	BAP	Nqosa Mahao	Centre-left	Social democracy Left-wing populism	6 / 120
Alliance of Democrats; Lekhotla la Kopano ea Sechaba	AD	Monyane Moleleki	Centre-left	Social democracy	5 / 120
Movement for Economic Change; Sethala sa Kholiso ea Moruo	MEC	Selibe Mochoboroane		Anti-corruption	4 / 120
Lesotho Congress for Democracy; Lekhotla la puso ea sechaba ka sechaba	LCD	Mothetjoa Metsing	Centre-left	Pan-Africanism; Social democracy	3 / 120
Socialist Revolutionaries; Kanana Ea Basotho	SR	Teboho Mojapela	Left-wing	Socialism	2 / 120
Basotho National Party	BNP	Machesetsa Mofomobe	Centre-right	Nationalism; Populism; Conservatism	1 / 120
Popular Front for Democracy; Khoeetsa ea Sechaba	PFD	Lekhetho Rakuoane	Centre-left to left-wing	Social democracy Democratic socialism	1 / 120
Mpulule Political Summit	MPS	Remaketse Sehlabaka	Centre-right	Conservatism; Christian democracy	1 / 120
Basotho Covenant Movement	BCM	Monaheng Sekese	Centre-right	Conservatism; Christian democracy	1 / 120
HOPE – Mphatlalatsane	HOPE	Machabana Lemphane Letsie			1 / 120
National Independent Party	NIP	Kimetso Mathaba	Centre-right to right-wing	Conservatism; Republicanism	1 / 120

=== Other parties ===
- African Ark (AA)
- African Unity Movement (AUM)
- Alliance of Congress Parties (ACP)
- Alliance for Free Movement (AFM)
- Basotho Batho Democratic Party (BBDP)
- Basotho Democratic National Party (BDNP)
- Basotho Patriotic Party (BPP)
- Basutoland Total Liberation Congress (BTLC)
- Basutoland African Congress (BAC)
- Basutoland Congress Party (BCP)
- Communist Party of Lesotho (CPL)
- Lekhotla la Mekhoa le Meetlo (LMM)
- Lesotho People's Congress (LPC)
- Lesotho Workers' Party (LWP)
- Marematlou Freedom Party (MFP)
- National Progressive Party (NPP)
- Reformed Congress of Lesotho (RCL)
- United For Change (UFC)
- Basotho Liberation Movement (BLM)

== See also ==
- List of political parties by country
- Politics of Lesotho
