= Next Lesotho general election =

- By October 2027
Party	Leader	Last election
RFP	Sam Matekane	57
DC	Mathibeli Mokhothu	29
ABC	Nkaku Kabi	8
BAP	Nqosa Mahao	6
AD	Ntoi Rapapa	5
MEC	Selibe Mochoboroane	4
LCD	Mothetjoa Metsing	3
SR	Teboho Mojapela	2
BNP	Machesetsa Mofomobe	1
PFD	Lekhetho Rakuoane	1
MPS	Remaketse Sehlabaka	1
BCM	Ts'epo Lipholo	1
HOPE	Machabana Lemphane Letsie	1
NIP	Kimetso Mathaba	1
Incumbent Prime Minister
Sam Matekane; RFP

General elections are scheduled to be held in Lesotho by October 2027 to elect members of the National Assembly, the lower house of Parliament.

== Electoral system ==
The 120 members of the National Assembly are elected using a mixed single vote with seat linkage system for mixed-member proportional representation. Eighty members are elected from single-member constituencies by first-past-the-post voting, with the remaining 40 elected from a single nationwide constituency as leveling seats, which are allocated to make seat totals reflect the national vote share. Any party winning more seats in the single-member constituencies than their national vote share entitles them to will not be awarded more seats.
