= Elections in Lesotho =

Lesotho elects a legislature on the national level. The Parliament has two chambers: the National Assembly with 120 members, elected for a five-year term by Mixed Member Proportional Representation, 80 of them in single-seat constituencies; and the Senate, with 33 nominated members.

== Previous elections ==
- 1970 Lesotho general election
- 1985 Lesotho general election
- 1993 Lesotho general election
- 1998 Lesotho general election
- 2002 Lesotho general election
- 2007 Lesotho general election
- 2012 Lesotho general election
- 2015 Lesotho general election
- 2017 Lesotho general election

== Latest election ==
The elections were postponed in the Stadium Area constituency following the death of the Basotholand Total Liberation Congress candidate.

The ruling All Basotho Convention lost all its constituency seats, including that of party leader Nkaku Kabi. Although the Democratic Congress party ran its campaign opposing the ABC, the party's recent support for the coalition government allowed the new Revolution for Prosperity (RFP) party to seem more credible as a new start.

Party	Votes	%	Seats			
Party	Votes	%	FPTP	List	Total	+/−
Revolution for Prosperity	201,478	38.89	57	0	57	New
Democratic Congress	128,517	24.81	18	11	29	−1
All Basotho Convention	37,809	7.30	0	8	8	−40
Basotho Action Party	29,285	5.65	0	6	6	New
Alliance of Democrats	20,843	4.02	2	3	5	−4
Movement for Economic Change	17,281	3.34	1	3	4	−2
Lesotho Congress for Democracy	12,326	2.38	0	3	3	−8
Socialist Revolutionaries	10,738	2.07	1	1	2	New
Basotho National Party	7,367	1.42	0	1	1	−4
Popular Front for Democracy	4,655	0.90	0	1	1	−2
Mpulule Political Summit	4,485	0.87	0	1	1	New
Basotho Covenant Movement	4,117	0.79	0	1	1	New
HOPE – Mphatlalatsane	3,717	0.72	0	1	1	New
National Independent Party	3,704	0.71	1	0	1	0
Basotho Patriotic Party	3,201	0.62	0	0	0	New
United For Change	2,940	0.57	0	0	0	New
Lesotho People's Congress	2,075	0.40	0	0	0	0
Alliance for Free Movement	2,002	0.39	0	0	0	New
Basutoland Congress Party	1,911	0.37	0	0	0	−1
Reformed Congress of Lesotho	1,809	0.35	0	0	0	−1
Marematlou Freedom Party	1,767	0.34	0	0	0	−1
Basotho Liberation Movement	1,530	0.30	0	0	0	New
Basotho Democratic Congress	1,167	0.23	0	0	0	New
Basotho Democratic National Party	1,165	0.22	0	0	0	0
Lesotho Economic Freedom	1,153	0.22	0	0	0	New
Basotho Economic Enrichment	1,076	0.21	0	0	0	New
Basotho Total Liberation Congress	888	0.17	0	0	0	New
Khothalang Basotho	828	0.16	0	0	0	New
African Unity Movement	750	0.14	0	0	0	0
Your Opportunity and Network Alliance	719	0.14	0	0	0	New
Lekhotla la Mekhoa le Meetlo	579	0.11	0	0	0	0
Basotho Social Party	557	0.11	0	0	0	New
Metsi and Natural Resources Party	533	0.10	0	0	0	New
Basotho Poverty Solution Party	472	0.09	0	0	0	New
Bahlabani ba Tokoloho Movement	468	0.09	0	0	0	New
Development Party for All	469	0.09	0	0	0	New
Basutholand African National Congress	446	0.09	0	0	0	0
Revolutionary Alliance of Democracy	432	0.08	0	0	0	New
Tsepo Ea Basotho	423	0.08	0	0	0	New
African Ark	344	0.07	0	0	0	New
Basotho Council for Economic Freedom	302	0.06	0	0	0	New
Basotho Redevelopment Party	288	0.06	0	0	0	New
Empowerment Movement for Basotho	282	0.05	0	0	0	New
Mookoli Theological Front	264	0.05	0	0	0	New
Yearn for Economic Sustainability	231	0.04	0	0	0	New
People's Convention	225	0.04	0	0	0	New
Allies for Patriotic Change	195	0.04	0	0	0	New
Prayer Shawl and Light	118	0.02	0	0	0	New
Independents	123	0.02	0	0	0	0
Total	518,054	100.00	80	40	120	0
Valid votes	518,054	98.74				
Invalid/blank votes	6,594	1.26				
Total votes	524,648	100.00				
Registered voters/turnout	1,388,117	37.80				
Source: IEC

== See also ==
- Electoral calendar
- Electoral system
