= Politics of Lesotho =

Politics of Lesotho takes place in a framework of a parliamentary representative democratic constitutional monarchy, whereby the Prime Minister of Lesotho is the head of government, and of a multi-party system. Executive power is exercised by the government. Legislative power is vested in both the government and the two chambers of Parliament, the Senate and the National Assembly. The Judiciary is independent of the executive and the legislature.

== Executive branch ==
Main office-holders
Office	Name	Party	Since
King	Letsie III		7 February 1996
Prime Minister	Sam Matekane	Revolution for Prosperity	28 October 2022

The Lesotho Government is a constitutional monarchy. The Prime Minister, Sam Matekane, is head of government and has executive authority. The King serves a largely ceremonial function; he no longer possesses any executive authority and is proscribed from actively participating in political initiatives. According to the constitution, the leader of the majority party in the assembly automatically becomes prime minister; the monarch is hereditary, but, under the terms of the constitution which came into effect after the March 1993 election, the monarch is a "living symbol of national unity" with no executive or legislative powers; under traditional law the college of chiefs has the power to determine who is next in the line of succession, who shall serve as regent in the event that the successor is not of mature age, and may even depose the monarch.

== Legislative branch ==
Parliament has two chambers. The National Assembly has 120 members, elected for a five-year term, 80 in single-seat constituencies and 40 by proportional representation. The Senate has 33 nominated members.

== Political parties and elections ==
=== General elections ===
The elections were postponed in the Stadium Area constituency following the death of the Basotholand Total Liberation Congress candidate.

The ruling All Basotho Convention lost all its constituency seats, including that of party leader Nkaku Kabi. Although the Democratic Congress party ran its campaign opposing the ABC, the party's recent support for the coalition government allowed the new Revolution for Prosperity (RFP) party to seem more credible as a new start.

Graph of the party split among 120 seats.
Party	Votes	%	Seats			
Party	Votes	%	FPTP	List	Total	+/−
Revolution for Prosperity	201,478	38.89	57	0	57	New
Democratic Congress	128,517	24.81	18	11	29	−1
All Basotho Convention	37,809	7.30	0	8	8	−40
Basotho Action Party	29,285	5.65	0	6	6	New
Alliance of Democrats	20,843	4.02	2	3	5	−4
Movement for Economic Change	17,281	3.34	1	3	4	−2
Lesotho Congress for Democracy	12,326	2.38	0	3	3	−8
Socialist Revolutionaries	10,738	2.07	1	1	2	New
Basotho National Party	7,367	1.42	0	1	1	−4
Popular Front for Democracy	4,655	0.90	0	1	1	−2
Mpulule Political Summit	4,485	0.87	0	1	1	New
Basotho Covenant Movement	4,117	0.79	0	1	1	New
HOPE – Mphatlalatsane	3,717	0.72	0	1	1	New
National Independent Party	3,704	0.71	1	0	1	0
Basotho Patriotic Party	3,201	0.62	0	0	0	New
United for Change	2,940	0.57	0	0	0	New
Lesotho People's Congress	2,075	0.40	0	0	0	0
Alliance for Free Movement	2,002	0.39	0	0	0	New
Basutoland Congress Party	1,911	0.37	0	0	0	−1
Reformed Congress of Lesotho	1,809	0.35	0	0	0	−1
Marematlou Freedom Party	1,767	0.34	0	0	0	−1
Basotho Liberation Movement	1,530	0.30	0	0	0	New
Basotho Democratic Congress	1,167	0.23	0	0	0	New
Basotho Democratic National Party	1,165	0.22	0	0	0	0
Lesotho Economic Freedom	1,153	0.22	0	0	0	New
Basotho Economic Enrichment	1,076	0.21	0	0	0	New
Basotho Total Liberation Congress	888	0.17	0	0	0	New
Khothalang Basotho	828	0.16	0	0	0	New
African Unity Movement	750	0.14	0	0	0	0
Your Opportunity and Network Alliance	719	0.14	0	0	0	New
Lekhotla la Mekhoa le Meetlo	579	0.11	0	0	0	0
Basotho Social Party	557	0.11	0	0	0	New
Metsi and Natural Resources Party	533	0.10	0	0	0	New
Basotho Poverty Solution Party	472	0.09	0	0	0	New
Bahlabani ba Tokoloho Movement	468	0.09	0	0	0	New
Development Party for All	469	0.09	0	0	0	New
Basutholand African National Congress	446	0.09	0	0	0	0
Revolutionary Alliance of Democracy	432	0.08	0	0	0	New
Tsepo Ea Basotho	423	0.08	0	0	0	New
African Ark	344	0.07	0	0	0	New
Basotho Council for Economic Freedom	302	0.06	0	0	0	New
Basotho Redevelopment Party	288	0.06	0	0	0	New
Empowerment Movement for Basotho	282	0.05	0	0	0	New
Mookoli Theological Front	264	0.05	0	0	0	New
Yearn for Economic Sustainability	231	0.04	0	0	0	New
People's Convention	225	0.04	0	0	0	New
Allies for Patriotic Change	195	0.04	0	0	0	New
Prayer Shawl and Light	118	0.02	0	0	0	New
Independents	123	0.02	0	0	0	0
Total	518,054	100.00	80	40	120	0
Valid votes	518,054	98.74				
Invalid/blank votes	6,594	1.26				
Total votes	524,648	100.00				
Registered voters/turnout	1,388,117	37.80				
Source: IEC

== Judicial branch ==
The constitution provides for an independent hierarchical judicial system. The judiciary is made up of the High Court of Lesotho, the Court of Appeal of Lesotho, magistrate's courts, and traditional (customary) courts which exist predominantly in rural areas. There is no trial by jury; rather, judges make rulings alone, or, in the case of criminal trials, with two other judges as observers. The constitution also protects basic civil liberties, including freedom of speech, association, and the press; freedom of peaceful assembly; and freedom of religion.

The Court of Appeal is located in Maseru and consists of a President and 6 justices of Appeal.

The High Court has unlimited original jurisdiction over civil and criminal matters, as well as appellate jurisdiction from the lower courts and comprises a Chief Justice and other puisne judges. Parallel to the High Court is the Labour Court, which is a specialist court dealing exclusively with industrial and labour matters.

Magistrates Courts are presided over by judicial officers (magistrates) employed as civil servants. They are not courts of record and as such their decisions are not binding on future cases.

The Chief Justice and Justices of the Court of Appeal are appointed by the King of Lesotho on the advice of the Prime Minister of Lesotho. Puisne judges of the High Court are appointed by the King on the advice of the Judicial Service Commission. High Court judges may retire any time after attaining the age of 75, but may be removed from office by the King for malfeasance or infirmity.

Until 1970, there was a right of appeal from the Court of Appeal of Lesotho to the Judicial Committee of the Privy Council in London.

Judges in Lesotho are occasionally appointed from other Commonwealth countries, especially from South Africa and the U.K..

Chief Justices

Chief Justices of Basutoland;

- 1937-1948 Sir Walter Huggard (British)
- 1950-1952 Sir Walter Harragin (British)
- 1952-1956 Harold Curwen Willan (British)
- 1959-1961 Cox (British)
- 1961-1962 Elyan (British)
- 1962-1965 Watkin Williams (British)
- 1965-1966 Benson (British)

Chief Justices of Lesotho;

- 1966-1968 Johnston
- 1968–1973 Hendrik Rudolf Jacobs (South African)
- 1974–1975 Joas Tseliso Mapetla
- 1976–1986 Taufik Suliman Cotran (afterwards Chief Justice of Belize, 1986)
- 1986–1993 Peter Brendan Cullinan
- <1994–2002 Joseph Lebona Kheola
- 2002–2013 Mahapela Lehohla
  - 2004 Baptista Molai (acting)
  - 2013 Tseliso Monaphathi (acting)
- 2014-2018 Nthomeng Majara
- 2020-Present Sakoane Peter Sakoane

== Administrative divisions ==
For administrative purposes, Lesotho is divided into 10 districts, each headed by a district secretary and a district military officer appointed by the central government and the RLDF, respectively. The districts are: Berea, Butha-Buthe, Leribe, Mafeteng, Maseru, Mohales Hoek, Mokhotlong, Qacha's Nek, Quthing, Thaba-Tseka

== International organization participation ==
Lesotho is member of ACP, AfDB, C, CCC, ECA, FAO, G-77, IBRD, ICAO, ICC, ICRM, IDA, IFAD, IFC, IFRCS, ILO, IMF, Intelsat (nonsignatory user), Interpol, IOC, ITU, NAM, OPCW, SACU, SADC, United Nations, UNCTAD, UNESCO, UNHCR, UNIDO, UPU, WFTU, WHO, WIPO, WMO, UNWTO and WTO. It was also member of the WCL and OAU before they disbanded.

== Literature ==
- K. Matlosa Electoral System Design and Conflict Mitigation: the Case of Lesotho // Democracy, Conflict and Human Security
