= Tefo Mapesela =

Mosotho accountant and politician (b. 1974)

Tefo Mapesela MP
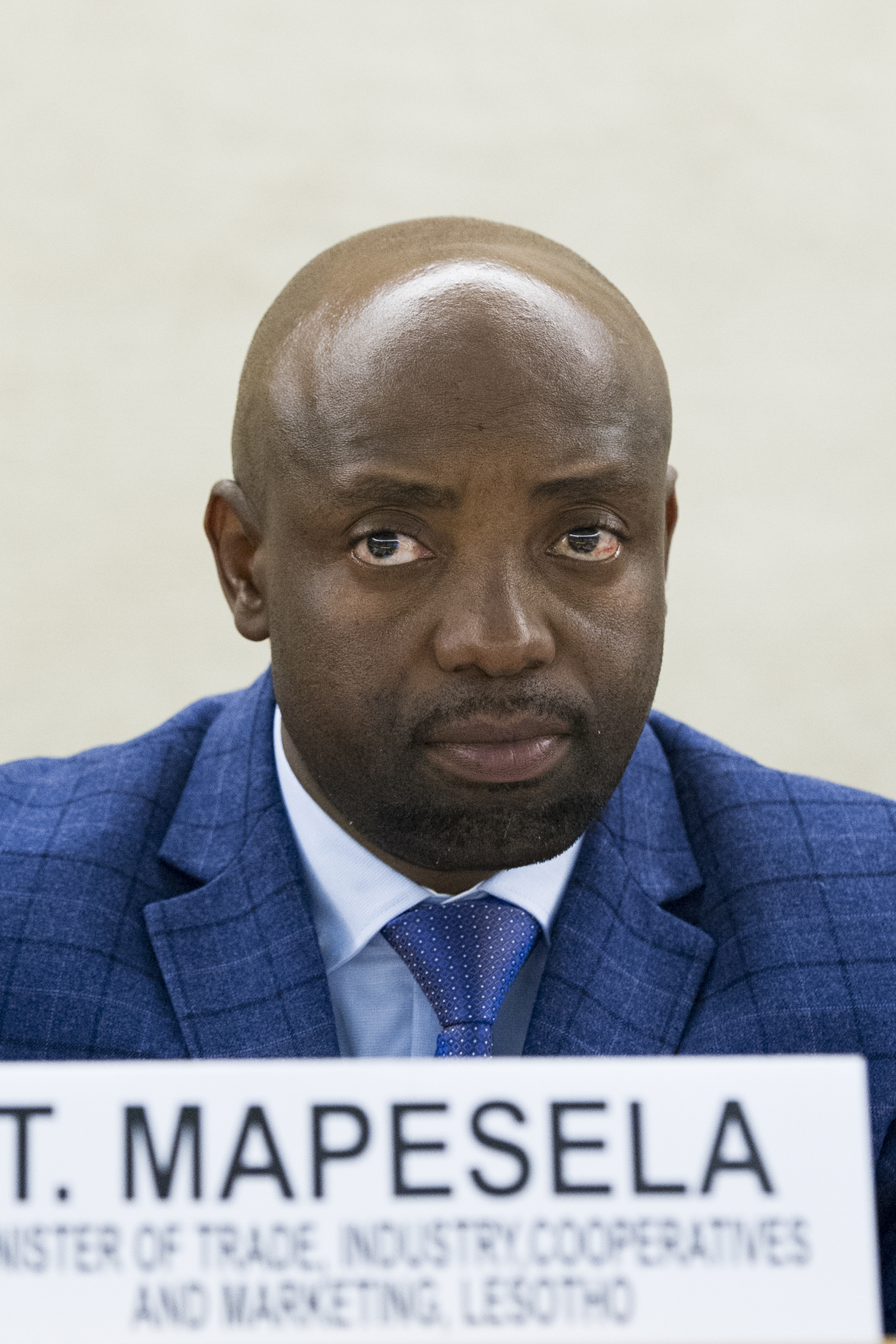
- Mapesela in 2018

Member of the National Assembly of Lesotho
- Incumbent
- Assumed office 17 April 2023
- Constituency: Proportional Representation
- In office 2015 – 7 October 2022
- Preceded by: Tlohang Sekhamane
- Succeeded by: Adontsi Letsema
- Constituency: Mokhotlong No. 79

Minister of Agriculture and Food Security
- In office 21 May 2020 – 14 April 2021
- Prime Minister: Moeketsi Majoro
- Preceded by: Litšoane Litšoane
- Succeeded by: Likopo Mahase

Minister of Defence and National Security
- In office 17 December 2018 – April 2020
- Prime Minister: Tom Thabane
- Preceded by: Sentje Lebona
- Succeeded by: Prince Maliehe

Minister of Trade and Industry
- In office 23 June 2017 – 17 December 2018
- Prime Minister: Tom Thabane
- Preceded by: Joshua Setipa
- Succeeded by: Habofanoe Lehana

Personal details
- Born: 25 April 1974 (age 52) Mapeleng, Mokhotlong District, Lesotho
- Party: Basotho Patriotic Party (2021–present)
- Other political affiliations: All Basotho Convention (Until 2021)
- Education: Centre for Accounting Studies

Tefo Mapesela (born 25 April 1974) is a Mosotho accountant and politician who serves as the leader of the Basotho Patriotic Party. He has been a proportional representation member of the National Assembly since April 2023, after previously serving as the legislator for Mokhotlong No. 79 constituency from 2015 until 2022. A former member of the All Basotho Convention, Mapesela served as the Minister of Trade and Industry from 2017 until 2018, as the Minister of Defence and National Security from 2018 to 2020 and as the Minister of Agriculture and Food Security between 2020 and 2021.

== Early and education ==
Mapesela was born on 25 April 1974 in the village of Mapela. He was raised by his grandparents. He was a livestock herder until he went to St James High High School in Mokhotlong. After finishing school, he trained as an accountant at the Centre for Accounting Studies. Mapesela then proceeded to work at Nedbank Lesotho, the Ministry of Gender, Sports and Environment and Lesotho Funeral Services before moving to the United Kingdom in 2003 to join his wife. He returned to Lesotho in 2005.

== Political career ==
=== Election to Parliament and cabinet roles ===
Mapesela became a member of the All Basotho Convention and was elected to the National Assembly of Lesotho in the 2015 general election for the Mokhotlong No. 79 constituency. He was re-elected at the 2017 general election. Shortly afterwards, he was appointed Minister of Trade and Industry by Prime Minister Tom Thabane.

During a cabinet reshuffle in December 2018, Mapesela was named Minister of Defence and National Security by Thabane; Habofanoe Lehana took over as Minister of Trade and Industry. He and the Minister of Mining Keketso Sello were dismissed as cabinet ministers in April 2020. Thabane resigned from office in May 2020 over his alleged links to his estranged wife's murder and was replaced by his Finance Minister Moeketsi Majoro as Prime Minister; Majoro appointed Mapesela as Minister of Agriculture and Food Security. Less than one year, Mapesela was dismissed as a cabinet minister by Majoro in April 2021 due to infighting within the ABC party.

=== Formation of the BPP ===
Mapesela soon announced that he would be leaving the ABC and was planning on forming a party, the Basotho Action Party, with Nqosa Mahao, who had also left the ABC. BAP MPs disapproved of him being a party member and he then formed the Basotho Patriotic Party shortly afterwards. Mapesela was a staunch critic of Majoro and tabled a motion of no confidence against his government in September 2021.

Mapesela lost his seat at the 2022 general election to Adontsi Letsema of the Revolution for Prosperity. Initially, the BPP did not win any proportional representation seats, however, after the election, the Independent Electoral Commission found that it had erroneously allocated PR seats to the Democratic Congress and the Alliance of Democrats to the detriment of the BPP and other small parties. The IEC consequently approached the High Court to allow it to amend the PR list and the court ruled in its favour in early-April 2023 which saw the BPP gain parliamentary representation with one seat in the Assembly. Mapesela was sworn in as a Member of Parliament on 17 April 2023.

== Personal life ==
Mapesela is married. He and his wife have five children. They reside in Mokhotlong.
