= Taung, Lesotho =

Constituency in Lesotho

Taung No. 56
- Single-member constituency for the National Assembly
- District: Mohale's Hoek
- Electorate: 14,329

Current constituency
- Party: Democratic Congress
- Member: Matiisetso Matsie

Taung is a constituency for the National Assembly that is located in the Mohale's Hoek District, Lesotho.

== Election results ==
=== 2022 ===
Candidate	Party	Votes	%
Matsie Matiisetso Elizaberth	Democratic Congress	2,465	33.08
Mokoroane-Manoeli Tselane	Revolution for Prosperity	1,796	24.10
Mangobe Selemo Desmond	All Basotho Convention	1,032	13.85
Madamane Thato	Movement for Economic Change	526	7.06
Lesenyeho Mojaki	Alliance of Democrats	423	5.68
Monare Motsokoane Mary	Basotho Action Party	199	2.67
Chale Hlalefang	Alliance for Free Movement	81	1.09
Various	Others	929	12.47
Total		7,451	100.00
Valid votes		7,451	98.35
Invalid/blank votes		125	1.65
Total votes		7,576	100.00
Registered voters/turnout		19,100	39.66
Source: Independent Electoral Commission
