= 2022 Lesotho general election =

- 7 October 2022
- All 120 seats in the National Assembly; 61 seats needed for a majority
- Turnout: 37.80% (▼9.05pp)
Party	Leader	Vote %	Seats	+/–
RFP	Sam Matekane	38.89	57	New
DC	Mathibeli Mokhothu	24.81	29	−1
ABC	Nkaku Kabi	7.30	8	−40
BAP	Nqosa Mahao	5.65	6	New
AD	Monyane Moleleki	4.02	5	−4
MEC	Selibe Mochoboroane	3.34	4	−2
LCD	Mothetjoa Metsing	2.38	3	−8
SR	Teboho Mojapela	2.07	2	New
BNP	Machesetsa Mofomobe	1.42	1	−4
PFD	Lekhetho Rakuoane	0.90	1	−2
MPS	Remaketse Sehlabaka	0.87	1	New
BCM	Ts'epo Lipholo	0.79	1	New
HOPE	Machabana Lemphane Letsie	0.72	1	New
NIP	Kimetso Mathaba	0.71	1	0
This lists parties that won seats. See the complete results below.

Prime Minister before	Prime Minister after
Moeketsi Majoro; ABC	Sam Matekane; RFP

General elections were held in Lesotho on 7 October 2022 to elect all 120 members of the National Assembly, the lower house of Parliament.

== Background ==
The previous general elections in 2017 were called after prime minister Pakalitha Mosisili lost a vote of no confidence. In the election, the All Basotho Convention (ABC), led by Tom Thabane, won 48 seats. The Democratic Congress (DC) led by Mosisili won 30 seats, the Lesotho Congress for Democracy party (LCD) secured 11 seats whilst numerous minor parties won 27. The ABC won three additional seats; however, the results of those constituencies were declared null and void due to the deaths of some candidates contesting those seats. Following the election, the ABC announced its intention to form coalition government with the Reformed Congress of Lesotho, the Alliance of Democrats and the Basotho National Party. The new government was sworn in on 16 June and Thabane assumed office as prime minister.

Thabane's estranged wife, Lipolelo, was murdered shortly before his inauguration. In 2020, Thabane began to face pressure to step down due to his alleged role in Lipolelo's murder. The coalition government subsequently collapsed after ABC's alliance partners withdrew their support. Thabane resigned from the premiership in May, and finance minister Moeketsi Majoro succeeded him. The ABC then formed another government with the Basotho National Party. Thabane later resigned as leader of the ABC, and in February 2022, the party elected Nkaku Kabi to succeed him.

Majoro did not contest the ABC primaries, while several ABC ministers lost their nominations.

== Electoral system ==
The 120 members of the National Assembly were elected using a mixed single vote with seat linkage system for mixed-member proportional representation. Eighty members were elected from single-member constituencies by first-past-the-post voting, with the remaining 40 elected from a single nationwide constituency as leveling seats, which were allocated to make seat totals reflect the national vote share. Any party winning more seats in the single-member constituencies than their national vote share entitles them to will not be awarded more seats.

== Conduct ==
Polling stations opened at 07:00. Delegations from the African Union, the Southern African Development Community, the Commonwealth of Nations and the European Union were present to observe the elections.

Voting concluded at 17:00. Whilst there were no reports of significant upheavals to the electoral process, polling stations turned away several individuals whose names were not present on the electoral roll. Independent Electoral Commission (IEC) director, Mpaiphele Maqutu, said turnout was higher than in previous elections. However, the IEC did acknowledge that participation in some rural regions was low, with a lighter voter presence in places such as Thaba-Tseka.

== Opinion polls ==
Polling firm	Fieldwork date	Sample	ABC	DC	LCD	AD	MEC	BNP	PFD	NIP	RCL	BCP	MFP	SR	BBDP	BAP	RFP	Others	Lead
2022 election	7 Oct 2022	581,692	7.1	24.7	2.3	4.0	3.2	1.4	0.9	0.7	—N/a	—N/a	—N/a	2.1	—N/a	5.4	38.9	5.9	14.2
Afrobarometer/Advision	Feb–Mar 2022	1,200	21	42	6	6	6	5	1	—N/a	—N/a	—N/a	—N/a	3	—N/a	8	—N/a	2	21
Afrobarometer/Advision	23 Feb–11 Mar 2020	1,200	18.7	42.3	7.2	7.8	10.9	6.2	1.2	0.2	0.6	1.4	0.2	2.2	0.2	—N/a	—N/a	0.9	23.6
2017 election	3 Jun 2017	581,692	40.5	25.8	9.0	7.3	5.1	4.1	2.3	1.1	0.7	0.6	0.5	—N/a	—N/a	—N/a	—N/a	3.0	14.7

== Results ==
The elections were postponed in the Stadium Area constituency following the death of the Basotholand Total Liberation Congress candidate.

The ruling All Basotho Convention lost all its constituency seats, including that of party leader Nkaku Kabi. Although the Democratic Congress party ran its campaign opposing the ABC, the party's recent support for the coalition government allowed the new Revolution for Prosperity (RFP) party to seem more credible as a new start.

Graph of the party split among 120 seats.
Party	Votes	%	Seats			
Party	Votes	%	FPTP	List	Total	+/−
Revolution for Prosperity	201,478	38.89	57	0	57	New
Democratic Congress	128,517	24.81	18	11	29	−1
All Basotho Convention	37,809	7.30	0	8	8	−40
Basotho Action Party	29,285	5.65	0	6	6	New
Alliance of Democrats	20,843	4.02	2	3	5	−4
Movement for Economic Change	17,281	3.34	1	3	4	−2
Lesotho Congress for Democracy	12,326	2.38	0	3	3	−8
Socialist Revolutionaries	10,738	2.07	1	1	2	New
Basotho National Party	7,367	1.42	0	1	1	−4
Popular Front for Democracy	4,655	0.90	0	1	1	−2
Mpulule Political Summit	4,485	0.87	0	1	1	New
Basotho Covenant Movement	4,117	0.79	0	1	1	New
HOPE – Mphatlalatsane	3,717	0.72	0	1	1	New
National Independent Party	3,704	0.71	1	0	1	0
Basotho Patriotic Party	3,201	0.62	0	0	0	New
United for Change	2,940	0.57	0	0	0	New
Lesotho People's Congress	2,075	0.40	0	0	0	0
Alliance for Free Movement	2,002	0.39	0	0	0	New
Basutoland Congress Party	1,911	0.37	0	0	0	−1
Reformed Congress of Lesotho	1,809	0.35	0	0	0	−1
Marematlou Freedom Party	1,767	0.34	0	0	0	−1
Basotho Liberation Movement	1,530	0.30	0	0	0	New
Basotho Democratic Congress	1,167	0.23	0	0	0	New
Basotho Democratic National Party	1,165	0.22	0	0	0	0
Lesotho Economic Freedom	1,153	0.22	0	0	0	New
Basotho Economic Enrichment	1,076	0.21	0	0	0	New
Basotho Total Liberation Congress	888	0.17	0	0	0	New
Khothalang Basotho	828	0.16	0	0	0	New
African Unity Movement	750	0.14	0	0	0	0
Your Opportunity and Network Alliance	719	0.14	0	0	0	New
Lekhotla la Mekhoa le Meetlo	579	0.11	0	0	0	0
Basotho Social Party	557	0.11	0	0	0	New
Metsi and Natural Resources Party	533	0.10	0	0	0	New
Basotho Poverty Solution Party	472	0.09	0	0	0	New
Bahlabani ba Tokoloho Movement	468	0.09	0	0	0	New
Development Party for All	469	0.09	0	0	0	New
Basutholand African National Congress	446	0.09	0	0	0	0
Revolutionary Alliance of Democracy	432	0.08	0	0	0	New
Tsepo Ea Basotho	423	0.08	0	0	0	New
African Ark	344	0.07	0	0	0	New
Basotho Council for Economic Freedom	302	0.06	0	0	0	New
Basotho Redevelopment Party	288	0.06	0	0	0	New
Empowerment Movement for Basotho	282	0.05	0	0	0	New
Mookoli Theological Front	264	0.05	0	0	0	New
Yearn for Economic Sustainability	231	0.04	0	0	0	New
People's Convention	225	0.04	0	0	0	New
Allies for Patriotic Change	195	0.04	0	0	0	New
Prayer Shawl and Light	118	0.02	0	0	0	New
Independents	123	0.02	0	0	0	0
Total	518,054	100.00	80	40	120	0
Valid votes	518,054	98.74				
Invalid/blank votes	6,594	1.26				
Total votes	524,648	100.00				
Registered voters/turnout	1,388,117	37.80				
Source: IEC

== Aftermath ==
On 11 October Revolution for Prosperity leader Sam Matekane announced that his party had reached a coalition agreement with the Alliance of Democrats and the Movement for Economic Change. Matekane will lead the government as Prime Minister.

PM Majoro submitted his formal resignation to the King on 14 October; the King accepted, and asked Majoro to remain until the new PM was inaugurated. This occurred on 28 October after the new parliament was sworn in.
