= Lehlohonolo Ramohlanka =

Mosotho politician

Deputy Speaker of the National Assembly of Lesotho
- In office 24 June 2020 – 25 October 2022
- President: Sephiri Motanyane
- Preceded by: Teboho Lehloenya
- Succeeded by: Tšepang Tšita-Mosena

Personal details
- Born: Matelile Ha Seeiso, Mafeteng District, Lesotho
- Party: Democratic Congress
- Education: National University of Lesotho

Lehlohonolo Ramohlanka is a Lesotho politician who was the first woman to be Deputy Speaker of the National Assembly of Lesotho, from 2020 to 2022. She previously served as the Secretary of the Government of Lesotho and High Commissioner to the United Kingdom.

== Career ==
Ramohlanka was born in the rural village of Matelile Ha Seeiso, Mafeteng District, Lesotho. She graduated from the National University of Lesotho in 1979 and the Lesotho Distance Education Centre.

She has a long track record in administrative and managerial roles across various ministeries, and has served as clerk of the National Assembly between 2007 and 2012, the first woman Secretary of the Government of Lesotho since 2015 until the collapse of Pakalitha Mosisili's government in 2017, and High Commissioner to the United Kingdom between 2000 and 2005. Ramohlanka was also the administrator of the Mafeteng District between 2005 and 2007 and member of the National Dialogue Planning Committee.

She is member of the Democratic Congress. Following Teboho Lehloenya’s removal from office via a motion of no confidence on 22 June 2020, Ramohlanka was elected the first female Deputy Speaker of the National Assembly on 24 June 2020, with 61 votes defeating minister of health Nyapane Kaya. She was succeeded on 25 October 2022 by Tšepang Tšita-Mosena.
