= List of socialist parties with national parliamentary representation =

The following is a list of political parties presently espousing a variety of socialism which have representation in national parliaments. The list does not contain parties historically or formerly represented in parliaments, nor parties whom identify as social democratic parties.

150 socialist, communist and anti-capitalist parties have been elected worldwide to parliament in 76 different recognized and non-recognized states. Of the 71 states listed here, 14 of them are republics ruled by a socialist, communist or anti-capitalist party, five of them are official socialist states ruled by a communist party; four of which espouse Marxism–Leninism (China, Cuba, Laos, and Vietnam) while the fifth (North Korea) espouses Juche.

N.B. Bold indicates the party is a governing party or part of a governing coalition

== List ==
Country	Party	Political Group	Election	Lower house	Upper house	Official ideology
Algeria	**National Liberation Front** (**FLN**)		2025 and 2026 elections	People's National Assembly 91 / 407	Council of the Nation 41 / 144	Socialism
Algeria	Workers' Party (PT)		2025 and 2026 elections	3 / 407	0 / 144	Trotskyism
Angola	**People's Movement for the Liberation of Angola** (**MPLA**)		2022 election	124 / 220	—	Democratic socialism
Argentina	Socialist Workers' Party (PTS)	Workers' Left Front(FIT-U)	2023 and 2025 elections	Chamber of Deputies 2 / 257	Senate 0 / 72	Trotskyism
Argentina	Workers' Party (PO)	Workers' Left Front(FIT-U)	2023 and 2025 elections	2 / 257	0 / 72	Trotskyism
Armenia	Armenian Revolutionary Federation	Armenia Alliance	2026 election	National Assembly 12 / 105	—	Nationalism; Socialism
Australia	Katter's Australian Party		2025 election	House of Representatives 1 / 150	Senate 0 / 76	Agrarian socialism
Belarus	Communist Party of Belarus		2024 election	House of Representatives 7 / 110	Council of the Republic 1 / 64	Marxism–Leninism
Belarus	Republican Party of Labour and Justice (RPTS)		2024 election	8 / 110	0 / 64	Socialism
Belgium	Workers' Party of Belgium (PVDA-PTB)		2024 election	Chamber of Representatives 15 / 150	Senate 6 / 60	Marxism
Bolivia	Popular Alliance (AP)		2025 election	Chamber of Deputies 8 / 130	Chamber of Senators 0 / 36	Socialism of the 21st century
Bolivia	Movement Toward Socialism (MAS-IPSP)		2025 election	2 / 130	0 / 36	Socialism of the 21st century
Botswana	**Botswana People's Party**	**Umbrella for Democratic Change**	2024 election	National Assembly 4 / 69	—	Democratic socialism
Brazil	**Communist Party of Brazil** (**PCdoB**)	**Brazil of Hope**	2026 election	Chamber of Deputies 11 / 513	Federal Senate 0 / 81	Marxism–Leninism
Brazil	Socialism and Liberty Party (PSOL)	PSOL REDE Federation	2026 election	14 / 513	0 / 81	Democratic socialism
Cape Verde	**African Party for the Independence of Cape Verde** (**PAICV**)		2026 election	National Assembly 37 / 72	—	Democratic socialism
Chile	Frente Amplio	Unidad por Chile	2025 election	Chamber of Deputies 18 / 155	Senate 2 / 50	Democratic socialism
Chile	Communist Party of Chile (PCCh)	Unidad por Chile	2025 election	12 / 155	3 / 50	Marxism–Leninism
China	**Chinese Communist Party** (**CPC**)		2022–2023 election	National People's Congress 2,478 / 2,847	Standing Committee 116 / 171	Socialism with Chinese characteristics
Colombia	Historic Pact for Colombia (PHxC)		2026 election	Chamber of Representatives 45 / 183	Senate 26 / 103	Democratic socialism
Comoros	**Convention for the Renewal of the Comoros**	—	2025 election	Assembly of the Union of the Comoros 31 / 33	—	Democratic socialism
Democratic Republic of the Congo	**Unified Lumumbist Party**	**Sacred Union of the Nation**	2023 election	National Assembly 8 / 500	Senate 1 / 108	Lumumbism
Costa Rica	Broad Front	—	2026 election	Legislative Assembly 7 / 57	—	Socialism of the 21st century
Croatia	We Can!	—	2024 election	Sabor 10 / 151	—	Eco-socialism
Cuba	**Communist Party of Cuba**	—	2023 election	National Assembly of People's Power 442 / 470	—	Castroism
Cyprus	Progressive Party of Working People	—	2026 election	House of Representatives 15 / 56	—	Marxism–Leninism
Denmark	**Green Left**	—	2026 election	Folketing 20 / 179	—	Democratic socialism
Denmark	Red–Green Alliance	—	2026 election	11 / 179	—	Eco-socialism
Denmark	Inuit Ataqatigiit	—	2026 election	1 / 179	—	Democratic socialism
East Timor	FRETILIN	—	2023 election	National Parliament 19 / 65	—	Democratic socialism
Ecuador	Citizen Revolution Movement	—	2025 election	National Assembly 65 / 151	—	Socialism of the 21st century
Ecuador	Pachakutik	—	2025 election	9 / 151	—	Socialism
Ecuador	Popular Unity	—	2025 election	1 / 151	—	Communism; Marxism-Leninism
Egypt	National Progressive Unionist Rally Party	National Unified List for Egypt	2025 Senate and Parliamentary Elections	House of Representatives 5 / 596	Senate 2 / 300	Nasserism
Eritrea	**People's Front for Democracy and Justice**	—	1992 election	National Assembly 75 / 150	—	Socialism
Finland	Left Alliance	—	2023 election	Parliament 11 / 200	—	Democratic socialism
France	For Réunion	Democratic and Republican Left group	2024 election	2 / 577	0 / 348	Post-Marxism; Democratic socialism
France	French Communist Party	Democratic and Republican Left group	2024 election	8 / 577	14 / 348	Communism
France	Republican and Socialist Left	Democratic and Republican Left group	2024 election	1 / 577	0 / 348	Socialism; Eco-socialism
France	Génération.s	Ecologist Group	2024 election	6 / 577	0 / 348	Democratic socialism Eco-socialism
France	L'Après	Ecologist Group	2024 election	4 / 577	0 / 348	Eco-socialism
France	Ecological Revolution for the Living	La France Insoumise group	2024 election	1 / 577	0 / 348	Democratic socialism
France	Independent Worker's Party	La France Insoumise group	2024 election	1 / 577	0 / 348	Trotskyism
France	La France Insoumise	La France Insoumise group	2024 election	71 / 577	1 / 348	Democratic socialism
France	Left Party (France)	La France Insoumise group	2024 election	20 / 577	0 / 348	Democratic socialism
France	Euskal Herria Bai	Socialists and affiliated group	2024 election	1 / 577	0 / 348	Socialism
France	Progressive Democratic Party of Guadeloupe	Socialists and affiliated group	2024 election	1 / 577	0 / 348	Democratic socialism Post-Marxism
Gambia	People's Democratic Organisation for Independence and Socialism	—	2022 election	National Assembly 2 / 58		Socialism
Germany	The Left	—	2025 election	64 / 630	4 / 69	Democratic socialism
Greece	Communist Party of Greece	—	2023 election	21 / 300	—	Marxism–Leninism
Guatemala	Guatemalan National Revolutionary Unity — Winaq	—	2023 election	1 / 160	—	Revolutionary socialism
Honduras	Liberty and Refoundation	—	2025 election	35 / 128	—	Democratic socialism Socialism of the 21st Century
India	Samajwadi Party	Indian National Developmental Inclusive Alliance	2024 election	37 / 543	4 / 245	Democratic socialism
India	Communist Party of India (Marxist)	Indian National Developmental Inclusive Alliance	2024 election	4 / 543	4 / 245	Marxism–Leninism
India	Rashtriya Janata Dal	Indian National Developmental Inclusive Alliance	2024 election	4 / 543	5 / 245	Socialism
India	Jharkhand Mukti Morcha	Indian National Developmental Inclusive Alliance	2024 election	3 / 543	2 / 245	Socialism
India	Communist Party of India	Indian National Developmental Inclusive Alliance	2024 election	2 / 543	2 / 245	Marxism–Leninism
India	Communist Party of India (Marxist–Leninist) Liberation	Indian National Developmental Inclusive Alliance	2024 election	2 / 543	0 / 245	Marxism–Leninism; Mao Zedong Thought
India	Revolutionary Socialist Party	Indian National Developmental Inclusive Alliance	2024 election	1 / 543	0 / 245	Marxism–Leninism
Ireland	People Before Profit	People Before Profit–Solidarity	2024 election	2 / 174	0 / 60	Socialism
Ireland	Solidarity (Ireland)	People Before Profit–Solidarity	2024 election	1 / 174	0 / 60	Trotskyism
Israel	Israeli Communist Party	Democratic Front for Peace and Equality	2022 election	3 / 120	—	Marxism–Leninism
Italy	Italian Left	Greens and Left Alliance	2022 election	4 / 400	3 / 200	Democratic socialism
Japan	Japanese Communist Party	—	2025 and 2026 elections	4 / 465	7 / 248	Scientific socialism
Jordan	Jordanian Communist Party	—	2024 election	1 / 138	0 / 65	Marxism-Leninism
Laos	**Lao People's Revolutionary Party**	**Lao Front for National Development**	2026 election	169 / 175	—	Kaysone Phomvihane Thought
Lebanon	Progressive Socialist Party	Democratic Gathering	2022 election	8 / 128	—	Socialism
Lebanon	Armenian Revolutionary Federation in Lebanon	March 8 Alliance	2022 election	2 / 128	—	Democratic socialism
Lebanon	Popular Nasserist Organization	March 8 Alliance	2022 election	1 / 128	—	Nasserism
Lebanon	Union Party	March 8 Alliance	2022 election	1 / 128	—	Nasserism
Lebanon	Lebanese Communist Party	—	2022 election	1 / 128	—	Communism; Marxism-Leninism
Lesotho	Socialist Revolutionaries	—	2022 election	2 / 120	—	Socialism
Lesotho	Popular Front for Democracy	—	2022 election	1 / 120	—	Democratic socialism
Luxembourg	The Left	—	2023 election	2 / 60	—	Democratic socialism
Mauritius	**Mauritian Militant Movement**	**Alliance du Changement**	2024 election	19 / 66	—	Democratic socialism
Mauritius	**Rezistans ek Alternativ**	**Alliance du Changement**	2024 election	3 / 66	—	Eco-socialism
Mexico	**Labor Party**	**Juntos Hacemos Historia**	2021 and 2024 elections	49 / 500	6 / 128	Democratic socialism Socialism of the 21st century
Moldova	Party of Socialists of the Republic of Moldova	Patriotic Electoral Bloc	2025 election	17 / 101	—	Democratic socialism
Moldova	Party of Communists of the Republic of Moldova	Patriotic Electoral Bloc	2025 election	8 / 101	—	Communism Marxism-Leninism
Morocco	Party of Progress and Socialism (PPS)	—	2026 election	19 / 395	0 / 120	Socialism
Morocco	Left Alliance	—	2026 election	8 / 395	0 / 120	Democratic socialism
Morocco	Front of Democratic Forces	—	2026 election	2 / 395	0 / 120	Socialism
Mozambique	**FRELIMO**	—	2024 election	171 / 250	—	Democratic socialism
Mozambique	PODEMOS	—	2024 election	43 / 250	—	Democratic socialism
Namibia	**South West Africa People's Organisation**	—	2024 election	51 / 104	28 / 42	Socialism
Namibia	Affirmative Repositioning	—	2024 election	7 / 104	0 / 42	Marxism-Leninism; Fanonism; Sankarism
Namibia	Landless People's Movement	—	2024 election	5 / 104	6 / 42	Democratic socialism
Namibia	Namibian Economic Freedom Fighters	—	2024 election	1 / 104	0 / 42	Anti-capitalism
Namibia	South West Africa National Union	—	2024 election	1 / 104	0 / 42	Democratic socialism
Nepal	Communist Party of Nepal (Unified Marxist-Leninist)	—	2026 election	25 / 275	11 / 59	Communism Marxism-Leninism
Nepal	Nepali Communist Party	—	2026 election	17 / 275	18 / 59	Communism Marxism-Leninism
Nepal	People's Socialist Party, Nepal	—	2026 election	0 / 275	3 / 59	Democratic socialism
Nepal	Rastriya Janamorcha	—	2026 election	0 / 275	1 / 59	Communism Marxism-LeninismMaoism
Nicaragua	**Sandinista National Liberation Front**	—	2021 election	75 / 90	—	Sandinismo
North Korea	**Workers' Party of Korea**	—	2026 election	671 / 687	—	Kimilsungism-Kimjongilism
North Macedonia	The Left (North Macedonia)	—	2024 election	6 / 120	—	Socialism
Norway	Socialist Left Party	—	2025 election	9 / 169	—	Socialism Eco-socialism
Norway	Red Party	—	2025 election	9 / 169	—	Communism
Pakistan	Balochistan National Party (Mengal)	—	2024 election	2 / 336	1 / 100	Democratic socialism
Pakistan	Majlis Wahdat-e-Muslimeen	—	2024 election	2 / 336	0 / 336	Islamic socialism
Palestine	Popular Front for the Liberation of Palestine	Palestine Liberation Organization	2006 election	3 / 132	—	Marxism–Leninism
Palestine	Democratic Front for the Liberation of Palestine	Palestine Liberation Organization	2006 election	1 / 132	—	Marxism–Leninism
Palestine	Palestinian People's Party	Palestine Liberation Organization	2006 election	1 / 132	—	Scientific socialism
Paraguay	Guasú Front	—	2023 election	0 / 80	1 / 45	Democratic socialism
Peru	Together for Peru	Together for Peru	2026 election	32 / 130	14 / 60	Democratic socialism Mariáteguism
Poland	Polish Socialist Party	The Left	2023 election	0 / 460	1 / 100	Democratic socialism
Portugal	Portuguese Communist Party	Unitary Democratic Coalition	2025 election	3 / 230	—	Marxism–Leninism
Portugal	Left Bloc	—	2025 election	1 / 230	—	Democratic socialism
Russia	Communist Party of the Russian Federation	—	2026 election	37 / 450	2 / 178	Marxism–Leninism
Sahrawi Arab Democratic Republic	**Polisario Front**	—	2023 election	51 / 51	—	Arab socialism Democratic socialism
Saint Vincent and the Grenadines	Unity Labour Party	—	2025 election	1 / 15	—	Democratic socialism
São Tomé and Príncipe	Movement of Independent Citizens of São Tomé and Príncipe – Socialist Party	—	2026 election	6 / 55	—	Democratic socialism
Slovenia	LEVICA	Levica and Vesna	2026 election	5 / 90	—	Democratic socialism Eco-socialism
South Africa	Economic Freedom Fighters	—	2024 election	39 / 400	9 / 90	Marxism–Leninism
South Africa	uMkhonto weSizwe	—	2024 election	58 / 400	6 / 90	Socialism
South Africa	South African Communist Party (Note: Its currently unknown how many seats the South African Communist Party has in the national legislature since its MPs are elected through the African National Congress, a separate political party. In the last election "almost the entire top SACP leadership was absorbed into the government".)	Tripartite Alliance	2024 election	0 / 400	0 / 90	Marxism–Leninism
South Ossetia	Communist Party of South Ossetia	—	2024 election	3 / 34	—	Marxism–Leninism
Spain	**United Left**	**Sumar**	2023 election	5 / 350	0 / 266	Communism, Socialism
Spain	**Chunta Aragonesista**	**Sumar**	2023 election	0 / 350	0 / 266	Eco-socialism
Spain	**Més per Mallorca**	**Sumar**	2023 election	1 / 350	0 / 266	Democratic socialism
Spain	Podemos	—	2023 election	4 / 350	0 / 266	Democratic socialism
Spain	EH Bildu	Left for Independence	2023 election	6 / 350	5 / 266	Socialism
Spain	Republican Left of Catalonia	Left for Independence	2023 election	7 / 350	4 / 266	Democratic Socialism
Spain	Galician Nationalist Bloc	—	2023 election	1 / 350	1 / 266	Socialism
Sri Lanka	**Janatha Vimukthi Peramuna**	**National People's Power**	2024 election	159 / 225	—	Marxism–Leninism
Sweden	Left Party	—	2026 election	30 / 349	—	Socialism
Tajikistan	Socialist Party of Tajikistan	—	2025 election	1 / 63	0 / 33	Socialism
Tanzania	Alliance for Change and Transparency	—	2025 election	2 / 403	—	Democratic socialism
Turkey	Party of the Greens and Left Future	Labour and Freedom Alliance	2023 election	61 / 600	—	Anti-capitalism
Turkey	Workers' Party of Turkey	Labour and Freedom Alliance	2023 election	4 / 600	—	Marxism-Leninism
United Kingdom	Your Party	Independent Alliance	—	2 / 650	—	Socialism
Uruguay	**Movement of Popular Participation**	**Broad Front**	2024 election	35 / 99	9 / 30	Socialism of the 21st century
Uruguay	**Communist Party of Uruguay**	**Broad Front**	2024 election	5 / 99	2 / 30	Marxism–Leninism
Uruguay	**People's Victory Party**	**Broad Front**	2024 election	1 / 99	0 / 30	Marxism
Uruguay	**Socialist Party of Uruguay**	**Broad Front**	2024 election	0 / 99	1 / 30	Socialism of the 21st century
Vanuatu	Vanua'aku Pati	—	2025 election	7 / 52	—	Melanesian socialism
Venezuela	**United Socialist Party of Venezuela**	Great Patriotic Pole	2025 election	219 / 285	—	Socialism of the 21st century
Venezuela	Fatherland for All	Great Patriotic Pole	2025 election	8 / 285	—	Democratic socialism
Venezuela	Tupamaro	Great Patriotic Pole	2025 election	7 / 285	—	Marxism–Leninism
Venezuela	Movement We Are Venezuela	Great Patriotic Pole	2025 election	5 / 285	—	Socialism
Venezuela	For Social Democracy	Great Patriotic Pole	2025 election	4 / 285	—	Democratic socialism
Venezuela	Alliance for Change	Great Patriotic Pole	2025 election	3 / 285	—	Democratic socialism
Venezuela	People's Electoral Movement	Great Patriotic Pole	2025 election	3 / 285	—	Socialism
Venezuela	Venezuelan Popular Unity	Great Patriotic Pole	2025 election	2 / 285	—	Socialism; Marxism
Vietnam	**Communist Party of Vietnam**	Vietnamese Fatherland Front	2026 election	482 / 500	—	Ho Chi Minh Thought
Yemen	Nasserist Unionist People's Organisation	—	2003 election	3 / 301	—	Nasserism
Yemen	Arab Socialist Ba'ath Party – Yemen Region	—	2003 election	1 / 301	—	Ba'athism
Zambia	Resolute Party	Tonse Alliance	2026 election	5 / 280	—	Socialism

== See also ==
- List of socialist parties
- List of communist parties
- List of communist parties represented in European Parliament
- List of social democratic and democratic socialist parties that have governed
