= Tšepang Tšita-Mosena =

Mosotho politician and computer scientist (born 1977)

Deputy Speaker of the National Assembly of Lesotho
- Incumbent
- Assumed office 25 October 2022
- President: Tlohang Sekhamane
- Preceded by: Lehlohonolo Ramohlanka

Personal details
- Born: 6 January 1977 (age 49) Maseru, Lesotho
- Party: Movement for Economic Change
- Education: National University of Lesotho; Open University

Tšepang Tšita ‘Matlhohonolofatso Mosena (born 6 January 1977) is a Lesotho computer scientist and politician. She has served as the Deputy Speaker of the National Assembly of Lesotho since 2022.

== Early life ==
Tšita-Mosena was born on 6 January 1977 in Maseru, Lesotho, as the daughter of judge and sports executive Bambatha and Makhosi Jeanette Ts'ita, and has a twin sister and 12 other brothers and sisters.

She earned a bachelor's degree in Computer Science and Physics from the National University of Lesotho in 1998, and a master's degree in Development Management from the Open University of London in 2005.

== Career ==
She began working as a volunteer in 1998 at the Lesotho Highlands Development Authority and in 2000 she moved to Paris to work at UNESCO. In 2002, she was promoted to systems development specialist and returned to Lesotho in 2007 and founded the BAM business group with her brothers.

In 2017, Tšita-Mosena joined Movement for Economic Change as communications and marketing secretary and was elected vice president of the party in 2019, being the only woman in a leadership position in a political party in the country. In 2020, she advocated for the need for a new generation of young people in Lesotho politics, lowering the maximum age for members of parliament.

In the 2017 Lesotho general election, Tšita-Mosena won a seat in the National Assembly and chaired the Standing Committee on Trade, Industry, Finance, and Investment of the Southern African Development Community Parliamentary Forum. Her parliamentary activity focused on business growth, women rights, and vulnerable communities.

Following the 2022 general election, she was elected Deputy Speaker of the National Assembly on 25 October, succeeding Lehlohonolo Ramohlanka.

== Personal life ==
She is married and has three children.
