= Lebohang Monaheng =

Ministers in Lesotho

Minister of Public Works and Transport
- In office May 2020 – October 2022
- Prime Minister: Moeketsi Majoro
- Vice PM: Mathibeli Mokhothu

Member of the National Assembly of Lesotho
- Incumbent
- Assumed office 28 October 2022

Personal details
- Born: 12 August 1970 (age 55) Maseru District, Lesotho
- Party: DC

Lebohang Monaheng (born 12 August 1970) is a former Minister of Lesotho. He was serving as the Minister of Public Works from May 2020 to October 2022.

== Background and education ==
Monaheng was born in 1970 in Maseru District and grew up in Makhaleng in Lesotho. Monaheng got his primary school certificate from Lithabaneng Primary School, Maseru and his high school certificate from Masianokeng High School, Lesotho. In 1994, Monaheng received a Diploma in Motor Mechanics from Technical School in Leribe District in Lesotho.

== Career ==
Monaheng started his career as an Assistant Clerk in Lesotho Communication, he also worked at a Moolman Construction as a Mechanic. Monaheng occupied other positions in different firms before he went into politics in 2004 and became a member of Lesotho congress for democracy.
