= 2017 Lesotho general election =

General election held in Lesotho

- 3 June 2017
- All 120 seats in the National Assembly; 61 seats needed for a majority
- Turnout: 46.85% (▼0.90pp)
Party	Leader	Vote %	Seats	+/–
ABC	Tom Thabane	40.52	48	+2
DC	Pakalitha Mosisili	25.82	30	−17
LCD	Mothetjoa Metsing	8.95	11	−1
AD	Monyane Moleleki	7.34	9	New
MEC	Selibe Mochoboroane	5.06	6	New
BNP	Thesele Maseribane	4.05	5	−2
PFD	Lekhetho Rakuoane	2.27	3	+1
NIP		1.10	1	0
RCL		0.69	1	−1
BCP		0.59	1	0
DPL		0.48	1	New
MFP		0.47	1	0
This lists parties that won seats. See the complete results below.
Constituency winners and regional winners
Prime Minister before	Prime Minister after election
Pakalitha Mosisili; DC	Tom Thabane; ABC

Early general elections were held in Lesotho on 3 June 2017 to elect all 120 seats of the National Assembly, the lower house of Parliament. The elections were called more than three years ahead of schedule due to a successful vote of no confidence against the incumbent Prime Minister Pakalitha Mosisili.

== Background ==
After three years out of power, Pakalitha Mosisili returned to office as prime minister in the February 2015 general election as leader of the Democratic Congress, defeating Prime Minister Tom Thabane of the All Basotho Convention. However, in November 2016 an agreement was announced between the deputy leader of the Democratic Congress, Monyane Moleleki, and Thabane to remove Mosisili and install Moleleki as prime minister. Moleleki was suspended from the Democratic Congress in December 2016 and launched a new party, the Alliance of Democrats, in January 2017.

On 12 February 2017 Thabane returned to Lesotho from self-imposed exile, declaring that Prime Minister Mosisili no longer commanded a parliamentary majority and vowing to oust him in a vote of no confidence. He claimed that he was risking his life by returning.

The new opposition alliance defeated Mosisili in a vote of no confidence on 1 March 2017 and proposed Moleleki's name as the new prime minister; Mosisili, faced with the choice of stepping aside in favor of Moleleki or calling an early election, chose the latter. He advised King Letsie III to dissolve Parliament, and the King did so on 7 March, despite an opposition effort to obstruct the move. It was announced on 13 March that an early election would be held on 3 June 2017.

== Electoral system ==
The 120 members of the National Assembly were elected using a mixed single vote with seat linkage system for mixed-member proportional representation. Eighty members were elected from single-member constituencies by first-past-the-post voting, with the remaining 40 elected from a single nationwide constituency in a closed list as leveling seats. The votes from every constituency were tabulated (with votes cast for independent candidates ignored) to give a nationwide total for each party. A quota of the 120 total seats in the National Assembly is then calculated using each party's vote share and the number of seats won in constituencies is deducted in order to give the number of the 40 leveling -seats that a party is due. If the total number of seats due to be awarded is less than 120, the highest remainder method is used to distribute the remaining leveling seats.

== Results ==
Partial results available by 5 June, with counting for 57 constituencies completed, showed Thabane's opposition party, the ABC, winning 45 constituencies against only eight for Mosisili's party, the Democratic Congress.

Full results were released on 6 June, confirming a victory for Thabane and the ABC, which won 48 seats against 30 for Mosisili's Democratic Congress.

Party	Votes	%	Seats			
Party	Votes	%	Constituency	PR	Total	+/−
All Basotho Convention (Note: An additional three seats were won by ABC candidates, but the results in those constituencies was declared null, because candidates had died before the election.)	235,729	40.52	47	1	48	+2
Democratic Congress	150,172	25.82	26	4	30	−17
Lesotho Congress for Democracy	52,052	8.95	1	10	11	−1
Alliance of Democrats	42,686	7.34	1	8	9	New
Movement for Economic Change	29,420	5.06	1	5	6	New
Basotho National Party	23,541	4.05	0	5	5	−2
Popular Front for Democracy	13,200	2.27	1	2	3	+1
National Independent Party	6,375	1.10	0	1	1	0
Reformed Congress of Lesotho	4,037	0.69	0	1	1	−1
Basutoland Congress Party	3,458	0.59	0	1	1	0
Democratic Party of Lesotho	2,801	0.48	0	1	1	New
Marematlou Freedom Party	2,761	0.47	0	1	1	0
Lesotho People's Congress	2,364	0.41	0	0	0	−1
Basotho Democratic National Party	1,818	0.31	0	0	0	0
Lesotho Workers' Party	1,711	0.29	0	0	0	0
Baena	1,393	0.24	0	0	0	0
Hamore Democratic Party	1,311	0.23	0	0	0	0
Lekhotla la Mekhoa le Meetlo	1,024	0.18	0	0	0	0
Majalefa Development Movement	1,024	0.18	0	0	0	New
True Reconciliation Unity	817	0.14	0	0	0	New
Basutoland African National Congress	684	0.12	0	0	0	0
Tsebe Social Democrats	402	0.07	0	0	0	0
Community Freedom Movement	322	0.06	0	0	0	0
Basotho Thabeng ea Sinai	279	0.05	0	0	0	New
Sankatana Social Democracy	246	0.04	0	0	0	New
All Democratic Cooperation	170	0.03	0	0	0	0
White Horse Party	139	0.02	0	0	0	0
African Unity Movement	78	0.01	0	0	0	0
IND PR	37	0.01	0	0	0	–
Independent	1,641	0.28	0	0	0	0
Vacant			3	0	3	–
Total	581,692	100.00	80	40	120	0
Valid votes	581,692	99.04				
Invalid/blank votes	5,617	0.96				
Total votes	587,309	100.00				
Registered voters/turnout	1,253,540	46.85				
Source: IEC

=== By district ===
District	ABC	DC	LCD	AD	MEC	BNP	PFD	NIP	Others
Butha-Buthe District	43.38	14.74	10.91	7.97	3.79	1.71	9.46	1.64	6.40
Leribe District	43.30	8.75	22.38	2.25	2.57	3.72	10.23	1.68	5.12
Berea District	50.90	10.63	17.05	6.34	3.29	3.62	1.50	1.19	5.48
Maseru District	51.23	19.96	7.32	9.80	2.45	3.62	0.77	0.53	4.32
Mafeteng District	33.01	35.11	1.83	2.56	18.27	1.45	1.29	0.74	5.74
Mohale's Hoek District	30.11	48.82	-	5.13	7.53	2.29	1.27	0.85	4.00
Quthing District	14.39	52.33	-	7.22	3.26	19.27	1.33	1.19	1.01
Qacha's Nek District	6.64	76.25	-	3.67	4.53	5.66	0.59	0.33	2.33
Thaba-Tseka District	29.59	39.01	-	5.95	5.25	4.34	8.30	1.62	5.94
Mokhotlong District	37.59	39.55	-	3.96	6.14	3.28	1.84	1.87	5.67

== Government formation ==
The ABC said on 6 June that it planned to form a government in coalition with the Alliance of Democrats, the Basotho National Party, and the Reformed Congress of Lesotho. A government statement on 8 June said that Mosisili had submitted his resignation to King Letsie but would continue in a caretaker capacity. However, on 9 June, Deputy Prime Minister Mothetjoa Metsing, leader of the Lesotho Congress for Democracy, said that "there is no need for the removal of the existing government in office" and argued for the formation of "a government of national unity" for the sake of national stability.

Thabane's estranged wife Dipolelo was shot and killed on 14 June. Thabane was sworn in as prime minister on 16 June, and his cabinet was sworn in on 23 June, including Monyane Moleleki as deputy prime minister and minister of parliamentary affairs.
