= Mohlominyane Tota =

Mosotho politician

Mohlominyane Tota MP

Member of the National Assembly of Lesotho
- Incumbent
- Assumed office 17 April 2023

Personal details
- Party: United for Change
- Profession: Politician

Mohlominyane Tota is a Mosotho politician and the deputy leader of the United for Change political party. He was elected interim party leader in January 2023 after 'Malichaba Lekhoaba secured a job outside the country.

Tota became a member of the National Assembly of Lesotho following a High Court judgement in April 2023 which saw the UFC gain one proportional representation seat in the Assembly. In August 2023, Tota defied the party's instruction to vote with the government which led to the party distancing themselves from him.
