= Moeketsi Majoro =

Prime Minister of Lesotho from 2020 to 2022

The Right Honourable Moeketsi Majoro MP
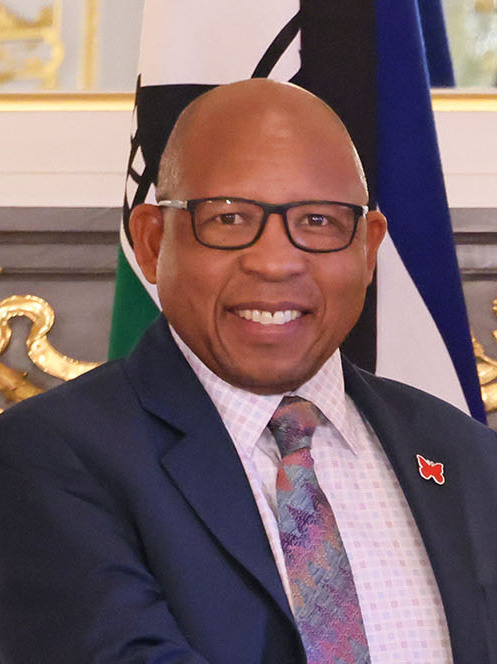
- Majoro in 2022

5th Prime Minister of Lesotho
- In office 20 May 2020 – 28 October 2022
- Monarch: Letsie III
- Deputy: Mathibeli Mokhothu
- Preceded by: Tom Thabane
- Succeeded by: Sam Matekane

Minister of Finance
- In office 23 June 2017 – 19 May 2020
- Prime Minister: Tom Thabane
- Preceded by: 'Mamphono Khaketla
- Succeeded by: Thabo Sofonea

Personal details
- Born: 3 November 1961 (age 64) Tsikoane, Leribe District, Basutoland (now Lesotho)
- Party: All Basotho Convention
- Spouse: 'Masekoalane Majoro
- Children: 2
- Education: Washington State University (MS, PhD); National University of Lesotho (BA)

Moeketsi Majoro (born 3 November 1961) is a Mosotho economist and politician who served as the sixth prime minister of Lesotho from May 2020 to October 2022. He was previously the minister of Finance in the cabinet of Tom Thabane from 2017 to 2020. Majoro has been representing the Thetsane Constituency No. 33 in the National Assembly since his election in 2017. He was formerly a senator and the minister of Development Planning from 2013 to 2015. Majoro is a member of the All Basotho Convention (ABC).

== Early life and education ==
Moeketsi Majoro was born on 3 November 1961 in Tsikoane, Leribe District, in Basutoland. He obtained a BA degree in Economics from the National University of Lesotho and achieved both a PhD in Natural Resource Economics and a Master of Science degree in Agricultural Economics from the Washington State University.

== Career ==
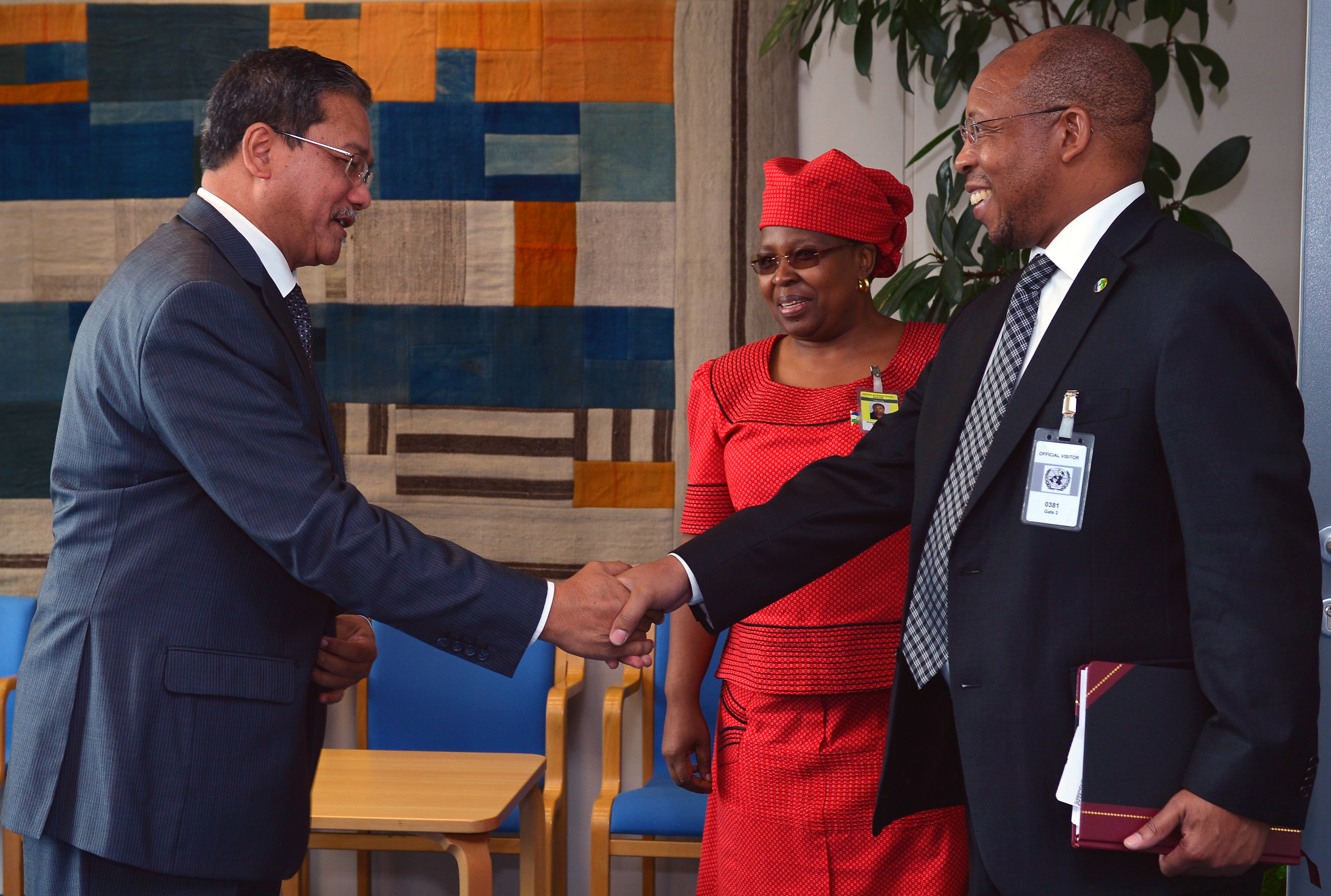
Majoro meets with International Atomic Energy Agency Deputy Director-General Daud Mohamad in September 2013

Majoro was a lecturer in economics at the National University of Lesotho between 1991 and 2000. He joined the finance ministry as a fiscal analyst in 2000 and worked in the position before he was promoted to be the principal secretary in 2004. He served the Africa Group 1 Constituency of the International Monetary Fund (IMF) as both Executive Director and Alternate Executive Director between 2008 and 2012.

In January 2013, Majoro was appointed Minister of Development Planning by Prime Minister Tom Thabane. He had earlier been appointed as a Senator. The government was voted out in the 2015 general election. In the 2017 general election, he was elected the MP for the Thetsane Constituency No. 33. Thabane returned as Prime Minister and appointed him the Minister of Finance.

In 2020, Thabane came under pressure to resign due to his alleged involvement in his ex-wife's murder. On 22 March 2020, the ABC Group in the National Assembly elected Majoro as Thabane's successor with 26 out of 46 votes.

=== Premiership ===
On 12 May 2020, Majoro was announced as the incoming Prime Minister after Thabane had lost his majority in the legislature. Thabane announced his resignation on 18 May with it taking effect the next day. Majoro was sworn in as Prime Minister on 20 May. He announced his cabinet the following day, which included Democratic Congress leader Mathibeli Mokhothu as his deputy. It consists of mostly ABC and DC MPs with other opposition party leaders serving in the cabinet. Majoro made his first international trip as Prime Minister on 12 June to South Africa and met with President Cyril Ramaphosa.

== Personal life ==
Majoro is married to 'Masekoalane 'Mamusa Rankhelepe. The couple have two children.

Political offices
Preceded by 'Mamphono Khaketla	Minister of Finance; 2017–2020	Succeeded by Thabo Sofonea
Preceded by Tom Thabane	Prime Minister of Lesotho; 2020–2022	Succeeded by Sam Matekane
