= Masetota Leshota =

Mosotho politician

Masetota Leshota MP

Member of the National Assembly of Lesotho
- Incumbent
- Assumed office 17 April 2023

Personal details
- Party: Basotho National Party

Masetota Leshota is a Mosotho politician who serves as a Member of the National Assembly of Lesotho for the Basotho National Party. She became an MP in April 2023 after the Lesotho High Court ruled in favour of the Independent Electoral Commission's application to recalculate and reallocate the proportional representation (PR) seats, which saw the BNP gain one PR seat following the 2022 general elections.
