= Paul Masiu =

Mosotho politician

Member of the National Assembly of Lesotho
- Incumbent
- Assumed office 17 April 2023

Personal details
- Party: Lesotho People's Congress; Baena
- Profession: Politician

Paul Masiu is a Mosotho politician, reverend and the leader of the Baena political party. In April 2023, he entered the National Assembly after the Independent Electoral Commission won its case in the Lesotho High Court to recalculate and reallocate proportional representation (PR) seats after it had erroneously awarded PR seats to two other opposition parties at the election in October 2022. He sits as an MP for the Lesotho People's Congress which is part of a coalition with his party and the Lesotho Workers Party.
