= 2015 Lesotho general election =

- 28 February 2015
- All 120 seats in the National Assembly; 61 seats needed for a majority
- Turnout: 47.75% (▼2.29pp)
Party	Leader	Vote %	Seats	+/–
DC	Pakalitha Mosisili	38.37	47	−1
ABC	Tom Thabane	37.75	46	+16
LCD	Mothetjoa Metsing	9.91	12	−14
BNP	Thesele Maseribane	5.53	7	+2
PFD	Lekhetho Rakuoane	1.73	2	−1
RCL		1.18	2	New
NIP	Kimetso Mathaba	0.95	1	−1
MFP		0.60	1	0
BCP		0.48	1	0
LPC	Kelebone Maope	0.34	1	0
This lists parties that won seats. See the complete results below.
Prime Minister before	Prime Minister after election
Tom Thabane; ABC	Pakalitha Mosisili; DC

General elections were held in Lesotho on 28 February 2015 for all 120 seats of the National Assembly, the lower house of the Parliament of Lesotho, more than two years ahead of schedule due to the 2014 political crisis. Following mediation facilitated by the Southern African Development Community (SADC), King Letsie III on the advice of the incumbent Prime Minister Tom Thabane, dissolved the Eighth Parliament and called a snap election.

Lesotho uses the mixed-member proportional representation voting system. More than 1.2 million voters had been registered by the Independent Electoral Commission. The army was confined to the barracks on the election day. The opposition Democratic Congress managed to form a coalition government as no party achieved an outright majority. Voter turnout was 48%.

== Background ==
After the 2012 election, Prime Minister Pakalitha Mosisili's Democratic Congress failed to attain a majority; and thus a coalition government was formed among the three opposition parties: All Basotho Convention (ABC), Lesotho Congress for Democracy (LCD) and the Basotho National Party (BCP). The government was led by ABC's Tom Thabane, who served as the new prime minister; whilst the leader of LCD, Mothetjoa Metsing was appointed as the Deputy Prime Minister.

Following political tensions and the suspension of the National Assembly over the controversial change of the head of the army from Lieutenant General Kennedy Tlali Kamoli to Lieutenant General Maaparankoe Mahao, an attempted coup d'état forced Prime Minister Tom Thabane to flee the country. He then returned under cover of South African and Namibian police, who guarded him around-the-clock. Under the auspices of the SADC, mediation led by South African Deputy President Cyril Ramaphosa resulted in a call for an early election. The national elections took place on 28 February. Thabane was backed by the national police, while his deputy Mothetjoa Metsing was backed by the army, which refused to recognise the change in army leadership.

On 17 October, the National Assembly reconvened in a bid to avert the political crisis, with Thabane's advisor Tumisang Mosotho saying "It’s a milestone. We want to hope this is the first step in the right direction, in liberating our country from the danger that has surrounded us these past few months". Senate Chief Whip Khoabane Theko said: "This is what we can call maybe the beginning of the process that takes us to the elections, because we are going to have a budget and maybe deliberate other laws... ahead of our elections from here on".

== Electoral system ==
The 120 members of the National Assembly were elected in two groups using a mixed single vote with seat linkage system for mixed-member proportional representation. Eighty members were elected from single-member constituencies via the first-past-the-post voting system, with 40 elected by proportional representation in a single nationwide constituency. Voters cast one vote and the 40 proportional seats were allocated in a compensatory system, in proportion to the number of votes received by each party.

== Campaign ==
Thabane said that he would run again seeking a new mandate after signing the Maseru Facilitation Declaration.

== Results ==
Election observer missions were deployed to the kingdom from the African Union, the Commonwealth of Nations and SADC; and were led by former Kenyan Prime Minister Raila Odinga, former Botswana President Festus Mogae and South African International Relations Minister Maite Nkoana-Mashabane, respectively.

UN Secretary-General Ban Ki-moon congratulated the citizens for conducting a peaceful election. The SADC Election Observer Mission concluded that the elections were "peaceful, transparent, credible, free and fair."

The Democratic Congress formed a coalition government with the Lesotho Congress for Democracy and five other smaller parties as no party achieved an outright majority. Pakalitha Mosisili took over as prime minister whilst incumbent deputy prime minister Mothetjoa Metsing retained his position.

Party	Votes	%	Seats			
Party	Votes	%	Constituency	PR	Total	+/–
Democratic Congress	218,573	38.37	37	10	47	–1
All Basotho Convention	215,022	37.75	40	6	46	+16
Lesotho Congress for Democracy	56,467	9.91	2	10	12	–14
Basotho National Party	31,508	5.53	1	6	7	+2
Popular Front for Democracy	9,829	1.73	0	2	2	–1
Reformed Congress of Lesotho	6,731	1.18	0	2	2	New
National Independent Party	5,404	0.95	0	1	1	–1
Marematlou Freedom Party	3,413	0.60	0	1	1	0
Basutoland Congress Party	2,721	0.48	0	1	1	0
Lesotho People's Congress	1,951	0.34	0	1	1	0
Basotho Democratic National Party	1,901	0.33	0	0	0	–1
All Democratic Cooperation	1,689	0.30	0	0	0	0
Basotho Batho Democratic Party	1,285	0.23	0	0	0	–1
Hamore Democratic Party	1,265	0.22	0	0	0	New
Baena	1,259	0.22	0	0	0	New
Lekhotla La Mekhoa le Moetlo	1,008	0.18	0	0	0	0
Community Freedom Movement	941	0.17	0	0	0	New
Progressive Democrats	751	0.13	0	0	0	New
Basotho African National Congress	582	0.10	0	0	0	New
Lesotho Workers' Party	577	0.10	0	0	0	–1
Tsebe Social Democrats	531	0.09	0	0	0	New
African Unity Movement	390	0.07	0	0	0	0
White Horse Party	174	0.03	0	0	0	0
Independents	5,651	0.99	0	–	0	0
Total	569,623	100.00	80	40	120	0
Valid votes	569,623	98.66				
Invalid/blank votes	7,754	1.34				
Total votes	577,377	100.00				
Registered voters/turnout	1,209,192	47.75				
Source: IEC Lesotho, Election Passport

=== By district ===
District	DC	ABC	LCD	BNP	Others
Butha-Buthe District	33.14	41.85	9.09	2.23	13.69
Leribe District	29.28	39.19	17.54	4.74	9.25
Berea District	28.47	50.10	9.15	5.25	7.03
Maseru District	35.01	49.72	4.75	4.55	6.97
Mafeteng District	41.44	30.80	14.78	3.50	9.48
Mohale's Hoek District	54.28	27.06	7.21	3.76	7.69
Quthing District	51.34	10.65	11.90	21.04	5.07
Qacha's Nek District	80.90	5.29	4.46	6.96	2.39
Thaba-Tseka District	44.09	22.38	9.32	6.37	18.01
Mokhotlong District	39.19	32.08	11.28	7.71	9.74
