= Thabang Nyeoe =

Mosotho politician

Chairman of the Basotho Democratic National Party
- Incumbent
- Assumed office 2006

Thabang Nyeoe is a Mosotho politician who served as a member of the National Assembly from 2007 to 2012. He is the leader of the Basotho Democratic National Party (BDNP), a splinter party of the Basotho National Party, since its founding in 2006.

== Early career ==
Prior to entering politics, Nyeoe was a businessman who owned a men's boutique in Maseru.
