= Mathibeli Mokhothu =

Deputy Prime Minister of Lesotho from 2020 to 2022

The Right Honourable Mathibeli Mokhothu MP

Leader of the Opposition in the National Assembly of Lesotho
- Incumbent
- Assumed office 28 October 2022
- Prime Minister: Sam Matekane
- Preceded by: Pakalitha Mosisili

Deputy Prime Minister of Lesotho
- In office 21 May 2020 – 28 October 2022
- Prime Minister: Moeketsi Majoro
- Preceded by: Monyane Moleleki
- Succeeded by: Nthomeng Majara

Minister of Parliamentary Affairs
- In office 21 May 2020 – 28 October 2022
- Prime Minister: Moeketsi Majoro
- Preceded by: Monyane Moleleki
- Succeeded by: Nthomeng Majara

Member of the National Assembly for Qhoali
- Incumbent
- Assumed office 5 June 2012

Personal details
- Born: Mathibeli Edwin Mokhothu; 20 March 1977 (age 49) Thaba-Chitja, Ha-Potso, Quthing District, Lesotho
- Party: Democratic Congress
- Education: Lesotho College of Education; National University of Lesotho
- Profession: Politician

Mathibeli Edwin Mokhothu (born 20 March 1977) is a Mosotho educator and politician who served as the Deputy Prime Minister of the Kingdom of Lesotho, as well as the Minister of Parliamentary Affairs, from 2020 to 2022. A member of the Democratic Congress, he is the party's leader and previous deputy leader. He was formerly the Leader of the Opposition in the National Assembly before the party formed part of a coalition with the All Basotho Convention in May 2020. From 2015 to 2017, he served as the Minister of Gender, Youth, Sports and Recreation. Mokhothu is the MP for the Qhoali No. 68 constituency.

== Early life and education ==
Mathibeli Edwin Mokhothu was born on 20 March 1977 in Thaba-Chitja Ha-Potso, Quthing District. His father was a miner. He studied at both the Lesotho College of Education and the National University of Lesotho.

== Political career ==
Mokhothu started his political career by joining the Lesotho Congress for Democracy and later joined the Democratic Congress. He was first elected to the National Assembly for the Qhoali No. 68 constituency in the 2012 general election. He was re-elected in the 2015 general election as the Democratic Congress emerged as the largest party without a majority. Democratic Congress leader Pakalitha Mosisili formed a coalition and became Prime Minister again. He appointed Mokhothu as the Minister of Gender, Youth, Sports and Recreation.

Mokhothu became deputy leader of the Democratic Congress in December 2016. The coalition government collapsed in 2017 and a subsequent general election was held. The incumbent government was voted out and succeeded by a coalition led by the All Basotho Convention. Mosisili announced his retirement from politics in November 2018. An elective conference was held in January 2019, in which Mokhothu was elected the leader. He received 1,681 votes versus 84 for his opponent Tlohang Sekhamane. He consequently became the Leader of the Opposition in the National Assembly.

In May 2020, All Basotho Convention leader Tom Thabane resigned as Prime Minister after his coalition partners withdrew their support. Finance minister Moeketsi Majoro was appointed his successor and formed a government that included the Democratic Congress and other parties. Mokhothu was selected as both the Deputy Prime Minister and the Minister of Parliamentary Affairs.
