= Monyane Moleleki =

Deputy Prime Minister of Lesotho from 2017 to 2020

The Honourable Monyane Moleleki MP

Deputy Prime Minister of Lesotho
- In office 16 June 2017 – 19 May 2020
- Prime Minister: Tom Thabane
- Preceded by: Mothetjoa Metsing (2015)
- Succeeded by: Mathibeli Mokhothu

Minister of Parliamentary Affairs
- In office 16 June 2017 – 19 May 2020
- Prime Minister: Tom Thabane
- Succeeded by: Mathibeli Mokhothu

Minister of Police and Public Security
- In office 30 March 2015 – 9 November 2016
- Prime Minister: Pakalitha Mosisili
- Succeeded by: Monare Phallang

Minister of Foreign Affairs
- In office 19 November 2004 – 2 March 2007
- Prime Minister: Pakalitha Mosisili
- Preceded by: Mohlabi Tsekoa
- Succeeded by: Mohlabi Tsekoa

Member of the National Assembly for National List
- Incumbent
- Assumed office 25 October 2022

Personal details
- Born: 5 January 1951 (age 75)
- Citizenship: Lesotho
- Party: Alliance of Democrats
- Occupation: Politician

Monyane Moleleki (born 5 January 1951) is a Mosotho politician who served as a Deputy Prime Minister of Lesotho, as well as Minister of Parliamentary Affairs, from 2017 to 2020. As a leading figure in the Lesotho Congress for Democracy (LCD), Moleleki was Minister of Natural Resources from 1993 to 1994, Minister of Information from 1996 to 1998, Minister of Natural Resources from 1998 to 2004, Minister of Foreign Affairs from 2004 to 2007, and Minister of Natural Resources from 2007 to 2012. After breaking with the LCD, Moleleki served as Deputy Leader of the Democratic Congress and was Minister of Police from 2015 to 2016. He left the Democratic Congress and launched a new party, the Alliance of Democrats, in 2017.

Moleleki has three children, named; Limpho Moleleki, Mohlomi Moleleki and Liepollo Moleleki, as well as four grand-children.

== Political career ==
Appointed to the government as Minister of National Resources in 1993, Moleleki was briefly kidnapped along with three other ministers by soldiers on April 14, 1994; another minister, Deputy Prime Minister Selometsi Baholo, was killed in this incident. Police then went on strike in May 1994, and Moleleki resigned and left the country for Botswana, saying that he thought he was likely to be targeted for assassination next. In March 1995 he returned to Lesotho and was detained by members of the National Security Service on March 29. He was elected as Deputy Secretary General of the governing Basutoland Congress Party at a party conference in March 1996. In December 1996 he became Minister of Information and Broadcasting following the death of the previous minister, Pakane Khala, in November, and in June 1998 he was again appointed Minister of Natural Resources.

After serving for several years as Minister of Natural Resources, Moleleki became Minister of Foreign Affairs in November 2004 and served in that position until March 2007, when he became Minister of Natural Resources again.

He was said to have been shot and wounded in the arm in an attack at his home at night on January 29, 2006.

Moleleki was viewed by some as a possible candidate to eventually take over from Prime Minister Pakalitha Mosisili. When Mosisili returned to office in 2015, this time as leader of the Democratic Congress, he appointed Moleleki, the party's deputy leader, as Minister of Police.

Amidst reports that Moleleki was talking to opposition leader Tom Thabane about forming an alliance, Mosisili removed Moleleki from his post as Minister of Police in November 2016 and instead appointed him to a post in the Prime Minister's Office. Later in the same month, Moleleki and Thabane announced an agreement to remove Mosisili and install Moleleki as prime minister. He was suspended from the Democratic Congress in December 2016 and launched a new party, the Alliance of Democrats, in January 2017. The new party and its allies defeated Mosisili in a vote of confidence on 1 March 2017 and proposed Moleleki as the new prime minister; however, Mosisili opted not to step aside and called an early election instead, despite an opposition effort to obstruct the move.

In the June 2017 parliamentary election, the parties opposed to Mosisili, including the Alliance of Democrats, won a majority of seats, and Tom Thabane became prime minister. Thabane's cabinet was sworn in on 23 June 2017, including Moleleki as Deputy Prime Minister and Minister of Parliamentary Affairs.

He is also known as "Mahaletere" because of his halter-like beard and mustache.

He is famous for a short video clip, that went viral, where he continuously kept say “Leqe” during a press conference. He was describing to a journalist what should happen when international donas give Lesotho money, he insinuated that it should be “chowed” and after it is depleted ask for more. The phrase “Leqe Leqe” means to “spoil” yourself with money that was donated to the country. The viral video inspired a song by a Lesotho Rapper named Sep Dz.

== See also ==
- List of kidnappings (1990–1999)
- List of solved missing person cases (1950–1969)
