= 2007 Lesotho general election =

- 17 February 2007

120 seats in the National Assembly 61 seats needed for a majority
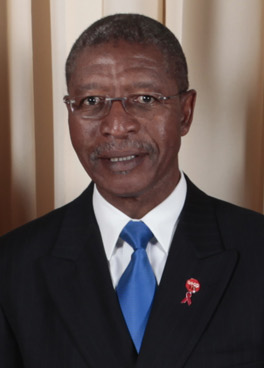

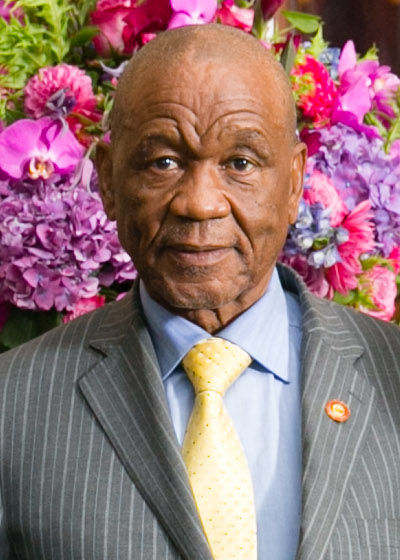

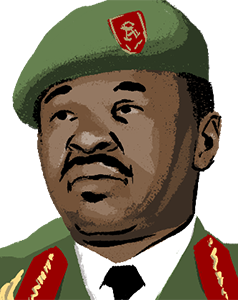
	Majority party	Minority party	Third party
Leader	Pakalitha Mosisili	Tom Thabane	Justin Lekhanya
Party	LCD	ABC	BNP
Alliance	LCD—NIP	ABC—LWP	—
Last election	78 seats	1 seat (LWP)	21 seats
Seats won	82	27	3
Seat change	▲4	▲26	▼18
Proportional vote	229,602	107,463	29,965
% and swing	51.83% (▼3.06 pp)	29.34% (▲27.90pp)	6.76% (▼15.65pp)
Constituency vote	304,316	125,880	24,721
% and swing	53.11% (▼4.53pp)	24.26% (▲22.86pp)	5.76% (▼15.68pp)
Prime Minister before election
Ntsu Mokhehle
LCD
Elected Prime Minister
Pakalitha Mosisili
LCD

General elections were held in Lesotho on 17 February 2007. They were originally scheduled to be held in April or May 2007. In October 2006, Tom Thabane left the ruling Lesotho Congress for Democracy (LCD) and formed a new party, the All Basotho Convention (ABC), and 17 other members of parliament joined him. This left the LCD with a narrow majority of 61 out of 120 seats. On the advice of Prime Minister Pakalitha Mosisili, King Letsie III dissolved parliament on November 24, 2006, and the election was scheduled for February 17, 2007. Bringing forward of the polling date caused dissatisfaction amongst the opposition, which expressed concern that it would not allow sufficient time for campaigning and electoral preparations. It was believed that the election was called early due to the possibility that there would be further defections from the LCD, depriving it of its majority in parliament.

80 constituency seats were up for election together with 40 seats allocated by proportional representation. The poll was monitored by the SADC and the American National Democratic Institute.

The electoral commission announced late on 20 February that the LCD had won 61 out of the 80 constituency seats, while the ABC won 17. The Alliance of Congress Parties won one constituency seat, and the vote in Makhaleng was delayed because a candidate there had died. The National Independent Party, which is allied with the LCD and acted as its decoy list, won 21 seats through proportional representation, and the Lesotho Workers' Party, which is allied with the ABC, won 10 seats through proportional representation. ABC leader Tom Thabane called the vote free, but not fair.

An extended dispute has followed the election regarding the allocation of the seats based on proportional representation. Despite acknowledging that the LCD won the election, the ABC has argued that the proportional seats were not allocated correctly. The LCD's reluctance to engage in talks prompted Thabane on October 18, 2007 to threaten street protests to pressure the government into holding a new election "if they continue to fail to co-operate".

== Results ==
Party or alliance		Proportional			Constituency			Total seats	+/–
Party or alliance		Votes	%	Seats	Votes	%	Seats	Total seats	+/–
LCD alliance	Lesotho Congress for Democracy				225,098	52.47	61	61	–16
LCD alliance	National Independent Party	229,602	51.83	21	2,751	0.64	0	21	+16
LCD alliance	Total	229,602	51.83	21	227,849	53.11	61	82	0
ABC alliance	All Basotho Convention				125,880	29.34	17	17	New
ABC alliance	Lesotho Workers' Party	107,463	24.26	10				10	+9
ABC alliance	Total	107,463	24.26	10	125,880	29.34	17	27	+26
Basotho National Party		29,965	6.76	3	24,721	5.76	0	3	–18
Alliance of Congress Parties		20,263	4.57	1	14,620	3.41	1	2	–6
Basotho Batho Democratic Party		8,474	1.91	1	6,561	1.53	0	1	New
Basotho Democratic National Party		8,783	1.98	1	5,938	1.38	0	1	New
Marematlou Freedom Party		9,129	2.06	1	5,106	1.19	0	1	0
Basutoland Congress Party		9,823	2.22	1	2,745	0.64	0	1	–2
New Lesotho Freedom Party		3,984	0.90	0	759	0.18	0	0	0
Lesotho Education Party					377	0.09	0	0	0
Popular Front for Democracy		15,477	3.49	1	162	0.04	0	1	0
Kopanang Basotho Party					29	0.01	0	0	0
United Party					18	0.00	0	0	0
Independents					14,243	3.32	0	0	0
Vacant							1	1	–
Total		442,963	100.00	40	429,008	100.00	80	120	0
Registered voters/turnout		916,230	–						
Source: African Elections Database, CLEA

=== By-elections ===
A by-election was held in Makhaleng on 30 June 2007 to determine the MP of that constituency; it was won by the LCD. Full results for the by-election were:

Candidate	Party	Votes	%
'Mankati Masobeng	Lesotho Congress for Democracy	2,165	45.42
Thaane Ramafikeng	All Basotho Convention	1,585	33.25
Antony Pitso Lephoto	National Independent Party	304	6.38
Gabriel Molahlehi Ramaphalla	Basutoland Congress Party	282	5.92
Gerard Khathu Khathu	Basotho National Party	262	5.50
Chobane Moqekela	Alliance of Congress Parties	71	1.49
Bernard Pheko Khoeli	Marematlou Freedom Party	51	1.07
Joseph Motheo Nchaka	Basotho Batho Democratic Party	47	0.99
Total		4,767	100.00
Valid votes		4,767	97.56
Invalid/blank votes		119	2.44
Total votes		4,886	100.00
Registered voters/turnout		11,174	43.73
Source: Government of Lesotho, Psephos
