= Alliance of Congress Parties =

Political party in Lesotho

The Alliance of Congress Parties is an electoral alliance in Lesotho, consisting of the Lesotho Peoples' Congress, the Basutoland African Congress, and the Basotho Congress Party. In the 17 February 2007 parliamentary election, the alliance won 3 out of 120 seats.
