= Keketso Rantso =

Mosotho politician

Keketso Rantso (or Rantšo) was a Minister in Lesotho. She served as the Minister of Labour and Employment in Lesotho appointed in June 2017.

== Education and career ==
Rantso completed her Primary Education at Siloe Primary School. She got her secondary school certificate in Masentle High School and a Diploma in Business Studies and Diploma in Secretarial Studies. Rantso was elected as the Deputy Secretary for Lesotho Congress for Democracy Youth league in 2003. In 2005, she became the secretary general. Rantso represented the Lesotho Congress for Democracy in 2012 and she served as the Minister of Public Works and Transport. She held various positions in the government before she was appointed to serve as the Minister of Labour and Employment.
