= United for Change (Lesotho) =

- Leader: 'Malichaba Lekhoaba
- Founded: June 2022
- Ideology: Economic liberalism
- Political position: Centre-right
- National Assembly: 1 / 120

United for Change is a political party in Lesotho. It was founded by Harvest FM founder 'Malichaba Lekhoaba in June 2020. The party did not win a seat in the National Assembly at the 2022 general election, but gained a proportional representation (PR) seat in the Assembly after the Independent Electoral Commission won a case in the High Court to change the seat allocation in April 2023 after it had wrongly allocated seats to other parties at the election. The party supports the governing coalition of the Revolution for Prosperity, the Movement for Economic Change and the Alliance of Democrats.

== Election results ==
Election	Votes	Share	Seats	+/-	Government
2022	2,940	0.57	0 / 120	New	Opposition
