= Keketso Sello =

Minister in Lesotho

Keketso Utloang Sello is a former Minister in Lesotho. He served as the Minister of Mining in 2017, the Minister of Small Business Development, Cooperatives and Marketing sworn in May 2020 and also the Minister of Communications, Science and Technology in February 2021.

== Background and education ==
Sello was born in Maseru district of Lesotho. He got his Primary School Certificate from Iketsetseng Private School in Maseru and High School Certificate from Maseru Day High School. Sello earned a certificate in Motor Mechanics from the Ighayiya Technical College, Port Elizabeth, South Africa.

== Career ==
In 1968, Sello became the Director of Lesotho Funeral Services. He is also serving as the Director of Humanities Building Construction and Transport and Logistics. Sello again occupied the position of the Director of Humanities, Farm and Poultry.
