= Reformed Congress of Lesotho =

Political party in Lesotho

- Leader: Mahabane Lemphane-Letsie
- Founded: 2014
- Split from: Lesotho Congress for Democracy
- Ideology: Social liberalism
- Political position: Centre
- National Assembly: 0 / 120

The Reformed Congress of Lesotho (RCL) is a political party in Lesotho.

== History ==
The party was formed in December 2014 as a breakaway from the Lesotho Congress for Democracy including Labour and Employment Minister Keketso Rantšo, Public Service Minister Motloheloa Phooko and former MPs Mamulula Ntabe and Motšelisi Tuoane. Rantšo was subsequently elected party leader in December.

In the February 2015 general elections the party received 1.2% of the vote, winning two of the proportional seats. In the early elections in 2017 its vote share was reduced to 0.7% and it retained only one of the two seats.

== Election results ==
Election	Votes	%	Seats	+/–	Status
2015	6,731	1.18	2 / 120	—N/a	Opposition
2017	4,037	0.69	1 / 120	▼1	Coalition government
2022	1,805	0.35	0 / 120	▼1	Extraparliamentary
