= Sam Matekane =

Prime Minister of Lesotho since 2022

The Right Honourable Sam Matekane MP
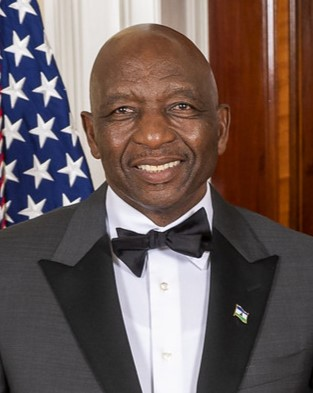
- Matekane in 2022

6th Prime Minister of Lesotho
- Incumbent
- Assumed office 28 October 2022
- Monarch: Letsie III
- Deputy: Nthomeng Majara
- Preceded by: Moeketsi Majoro

Leader of the Revolution for Prosperity
- Incumbent
- Assumed office 22 March 2022
- Preceded by: Party Founder

Member of the National Assembly for Mantsonyane
- Incumbent
- Assumed office 25 October 2022

Personal details
- Born: Ntsokoane Samuel Matekane; 15 March 1958 (age 68) Mantšonyane, Thaba-Tseka District, Basutoland (now Lesotho)
- Party: Revolution for Prosperity (2022–present)
- Relations: 3 known wives
- Children: 7
- Education: Form C (Year 10)

Ntsokoane Samuel Matekane (born 15 March 1958) is a Mosotho businessman and politician who is the current Prime Minister of Lesotho since 2022. Prior to running, he was considered to be the richest person in the country. Matekane made his fortune in diamond mining, as well as through government issued construction contracts. He founded his company, Matekane Group of Companies (MGC) in 1986.

In March 2022, Matekane held a press conference at his hotel, and formed the Revolution for Prosperity (RFP) party. Matekane self-funded a political campaign with a heavy social media presence and won the 2022 Lesotho General Election.

== Early life ==
Born on 15 March 1958, Matekane is the seventh of fourteen siblings. He was born in Mantšonyane, then called British Basutoland, now Lesotho.

He attended Bocheletsane Primary School in Basutoland before enrolling at Mabathoana High School in Maseru, where he completed a junior certificate after three years of secondary education. After obtaining his junior certificate, Matekane left school and pursued a business career. Growing up in a rural village, he balanced school with responsibilities such as herding livestock and working in the fields. Like other children in his community, he was expected to contribute to household duties, which at times led to missed school days.

== Business ==
Matekane is the founder and CEO of the Matekane Group of Companies (MGC), which was established in 1986 as a construction equipment sales business. The business purchased old and damaged vehicles from the government, repaired and resold it back to the government. The Group has since expanded into fields such as mining, aviation, property development, as well as farming and has opened a hotel.

The company's growth was largely supported through government tenders, which have since had their legitimacy questioned, as allegations concerning favouritism and political corruption have come forward.

=== Philanthropy ===
Through MGC, Matekane has funded several projects in the country. Matekane funded the construction of a football stadium, a school, and a convention center and a cost-sharing owner-farmer scheme farm in his village of Mantšonyane. During the COVID-19 pandemic, he bought testing equipment, vaccines and other medical necessities and donated them. He has made donations amounting to M8 million in Police Uniforms, and M2 million in Equipment for the Lesotho Defense Force.

== As Prime Minister ==
=== 2022 election and inauguration ===
In March 2022, several months before the 2022 Lesotho general election, Matekane founded a party called Revolution for Prosperity (RFP). He positioned himself as the "protector" of the country's business community, the "messianic" leader that would bring stability to Lesotho politics, and the "sole businessman" in the country that could end "corruption" and bring Lesotho back from the recession it has been experiencing since 2017. Matekane said he would "Make Lesotho Great Again" by any means necessary.

During his electoral campaign, Matekane accused his opponents of no longer serving Lesotho's best interests. His perceived outsider status helped his party win the election. Matekane's RFP party finished five seats shy of an absolute majority in the National Assembly. Lacking a simple majority to rule alone, Matekane formed a coalition government with two smaller parties, the Alliance of Democrats and Movement for Economic Change.

After his electoral win, Matekane outlined a 20-point plan to fight corruption and the M6.1billion Government Deficit within his first 100 days in office. He planned to reverse the economic recession via austerity and job creation from international investors.

=== Criminal activity ===
The relationship between the civil government and the police ostensibly improved under Matekane, however the government has also been criticized for a worsening homicide situation.

In response to the murder of journalist and radio presenter Ralikonelo Joki, his government introduced a nationwide curfew on 16 May 2023, banning residents from leaving their homes between 10pm and 4am. This curfew has been criticized for its strictness and concerns have been raised over its effectiveness.

=== Economic policy ===
In June 2023, Matekane launched the Entrepreneurship Hub and Seed Financing Facility, an initiative aiming to build 15 Entrepreneurship Support Organizations and incubate 500 start-ups, as well as engage with the diaspora. The total budget of the facility is $52.5M USD, with $45M as a soft loan and $7.5M as a grant, both from the World Bank.

In June 2025, Matekane declared youth unemployment in Lesotho a national crisis, and stated he would create 70,000 jobs in three weeks. Tšolo Thakeli, an activist who has protested government inaction on unemployment in the country for years, made a post criticizing Matekane's plan, saying it lacked substance, and criticized Matekane for not acting on unemployment prior to then. This post led to the Matekane's government arresting him for allegedly insulting Matekane, inciting unrest, and sedition. Thakeli' was released shortly after, following protests for his release, and statements of concern from human rights groups in the region.

=== Foreign relations ===
31 Basotho miners working illegally in South Africa were killed in an explosion in May 2023. Matekane has worked to reduce the prevalence of illegal cross-border mining, including by implementing an agreement signed by his predecessor in November 2021. In attending the launch of a binational commission on the issue, he said that the launch "ushers in a new beginning in the relationship between SA and Lesotho."

In September 2023, Matekane spoke before the United Nations in favor of more support to least developed countries and stated his hope to export electricity and water to South Africa.

=== Political issues ===
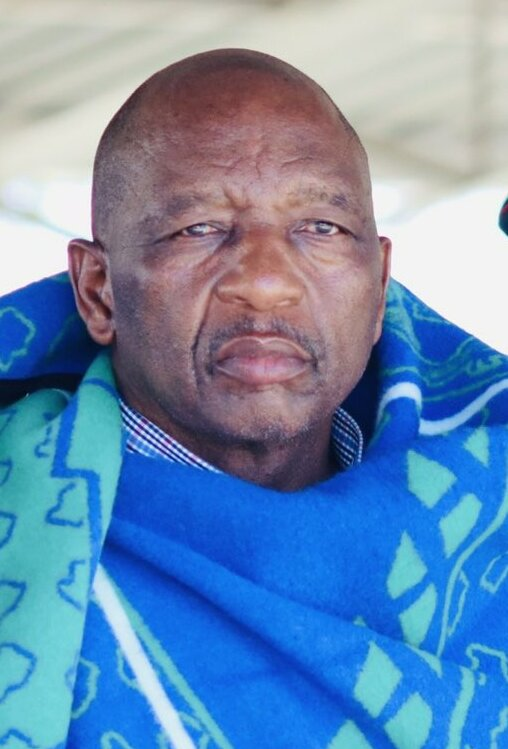
Matekane in 2023

Reportedly, Matekane had to finance his own inauguration due to a lack of public funds.

Matekane's cabinet included only 15 people, versus 36 in the previous cabinet. Three women were appointed, making up 20% of the cabinet. The previous cabinet included five women, but they made up only 14% of the cabinet. According to Afrobarometer, 73% of Basotho believe that the government should be doing more to promote women's rights and opportunities.

Matekane has thus far failed to pass the 11th Amendment to the Constitution Bill, which originated from the SADC-mediated national dialogue on reform in 2018–19. All political parties have ostensibly pledged to support the bill, however Matekane's government sought to divide it into three parts in early 2023, which was not supported by the opposition, who believed the governing parties were seeking to stack the civil service with its own supporters first.

On 30 October 2023, Matekane faced a vote of no confidence. His government sought to dispute the constitutional amendment that allowed the vote to go ahead. Lesotho's military intervened against the vote of no confidence, leading to opposition claims of a coup plot. In the end, the Basotho Action Party joined Matekane's coalition and he was not removed.

Tšolo Thakeli, an activist who has protested government inaction on unemployment in the country for years, made a post criticizing Matekane's plan to counter youth unemployment in the country, which led to the Matekane's government arresting him for allegedly insulting Matekane, inciting unrest, and sedition. Thakeli's arrest sparked protests in Lesotho's capital, Maseru, and statements of concern from human rights activists in the region. Thakeli was released shortly after, although he alleges the government told him to "never mention" Matekane's name again, and that they couldn't "guarantee" Thaekli "any protection" if he did.

== See also ==
- List of current heads of state and government
- List of heads of the executive by approval rating

Party political offices
New political party	Leader of the Revolution for Prosperity; 2022–present	Incumbent
Political offices
Preceded by Moeketsi Majoro	Prime Minister of Lesotho; 2022–present	Incumbent
