= HOPE – Mphatlalatsane =

- Leader: Machabana Lemphane Letsie
- Founded: September 2020
- Registered: November 2021
- Split from: Reformed Congress of Lesotho
- National Assembly: 1 / 120

HOPE – Mphatlalatsane is a political party in Lesotho founded in September 2020 by former home affairs principal secretary Machabana Lemphane Letsie after she left the Reformed Congress of Lesotho. The party was registered with the Independent Electoral Commission in November 2021. The party holds one seat in the National Assembly and is aligned with the governing coalition led by the Revolution for Prosperity.

== Election results ==
Election	Votes	Share	Seats	+/-	Government
2022	3,717	0.72	1 / 120	New	Opposition
