= Selibe Mochoboroane =

Mosotho politician (born 1976)

Minister of Agriculture, Food Security and Nutrition
- Incumbent
- Assumed office April 2026
- Prime Minister: Sam Matekane
- Preceded by: Thabo Mofosi
- Constituency: Thabana Morena

Minister of Health of Lesotho
- In office 22 October 2022 – April 2026
- Succeeded by: 'Mamokete Ntšekhe

Personal details
- Born: 27 July 1976 (age 49) Thabana Morena, Mafeteng, Lesotho
- Party: Movement for Economic Change

Selibe Mochoboroane (e mots'o moratuoa) is a Mosotho politician and the current Minister of Agriculture, Food Security and Nutrition after a massive reshuffle of the cabinet of Lesotho by Prime Minister Sam Matekane,previously served as Minister of Health in the same cabinet. He is the youngest party leader of the newly founded Movement for Economic Change (MEC), which was announced on 1 February 2017. He formed this political party after he was suspended from the Lesotho Congress for Democracy (LCD) which is led by former deputy prime minister Mothejoa Metsing.

He has served as a minister in the ministries of local government & chieftainship, Communications Science and Technology, Energy & Metereology, Small Business & Cooperatives as well as development planning. Mochoboroane is the current member of parliament for the Thabana-Morena constituency in Mafeteng, Lesotho. He was also the chairperson of the Public Accounts Committee (PAC) of the 10th parliament of Lesotho.
