= Basotho Patriotic Party =

- Leader: Tefo Mapesela
- Founded: May 2021
- Split from: All Basotho Convention
- National Assembly: 1 / 120

The Basotho Patriotic Party is a political party in Lesotho founded by Tefo Mapesela in May 2021 after leaving the All Basotho Convention. Mapesela, who was the Member of Parliament for the Mokhotlong constituency, lost his seat at the 2022 general election. In April 2023, the Independent Electoral Commission won its case in the High Court to reallocate seats that had been erroneously awarded to two opposition parties at the general election. The BPP was allocated one proportional representation (PR) seat and Mapesela consequently took up that seat.

== Election results ==
| Election | Votes | Share | Seats | +/- | Government |
|---|---|---|---|---|---|
| 2022 | 3,201 | 0.62 | 0 / 120 | New | Opposition |
