= Basotho Democratic National Party =

Political party in Lesotho

The Basotho Democratic National Party (BDNP) is a political party in Lesotho. It was founded in November 2006 by Thabang Nyeoe, a former member of the Basotho National Party.

In the 2007 legislative elections for the National Assembly, the party won 1 out of 120 seats.
