= Nkaku Kabi =

Mosotho politician (born 1973)

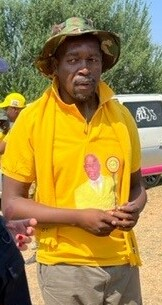

Leader of All Basotho Convention
- Assuming office February 2022
- Succeeding: Tom Thabane

Minister of Health Lesotho
- In office 2020–2021
- Prime Minister: Tom Thabane
- Constituency: Qeme

Member of the National Assembly of Lesotho
- Incumbent
- Assumed office 28 October 2022

Personal details
- Born: 10 July 1973 (age 53) Mazenod, Lesotho
- Party: All Basotho Convention
- Education: National University of Lesotho
- Occupation: Politician

Nkaku Kabi (born 10 July 1973) is a member of the National Assembly of Lesotho and a former Minister of Water in Lesotho. He is the current leader of All Basotho Convention. He previously served as Minister of Health in Lesotho.

== Background and education ==
Nkaku Kabi was born on the 10th of July 1973 at Mazenod in Maseru. Kabi got his First School Leaving Certificate from Mazenod Primary School in 1988 and his Secondary School Certificate from Masianokeng high school in 1994. Kabi received a Bachelor’s Degree in Development Studies and English from the National University of Lesotho and Honours Degree in Development Administration from the University of South Africa.

== Career ==
Kabi started his career as a tutor in bishop Mohlalisi High School. Thereafter, he worked as a Lecturer in Limkokwing University of Creative Technology. Kabi also served as a Member of Parliament in Lesotho.
