= Socialist Revolutionaries (Lesotho) =

Socialist Revolutionaries Kanana Ea Basotho
- Abbreviation: SR
- Leader: Teboho Mojapela
- Founder: Teboho Mojapela
- Founded: October 2017
- Registered: 28 January 2018
- Split from: All Basotho Convention
- Ideology: Socialism
- Colours: Orange; Black
- National Assembly: 2 / 120

Website
- www.srlesotho.co.za

The Socialist Revolutionaries (SR; Sotho: Kanana Ea Basotho) is a political party in Lesotho founded in October 2017 by Teboho Mojapela, a former member of the ABC. The party was registered on 28 January 2018.

in 2019 the party organized farmer protests against Prime Minister Tom Thabane.

In the 2022 general election, the party won 2 seats in the National Assembly.

== Election results ==
Election	Votes	Share	Seats	+/-	Government
2022	10,738	2.08	1 / 120	New	Opposition
