= Popular Front for Democracy =

Political party in Lesotho

Popular Front for Democracy Khoeetsa ea Sechaba
- Leader: Lekhetho Rakuoane
- Founded: 1990
- Registered: 11 July 1991
- Ideology: Social democracy Democratic socialism Historical: Communism; Marxism-Leninism
- Political position: Centre-left to left-wing Historical: Left-wing to far-left
- National Assembly: 1 / 120

The Popular Front for Democracy (Sotho: Khoeetsa ea Sechaba) is a political party in Lesotho. At the elections for the National Assembly, 25 May 2002, the party won 1.1% of popular votes and 1 out of 120 seats. In the 17 February 2007 parliamentary election, the party kept 1 seat. In 2012 elections it increases numbers of seats in the parliament, it got 3 seats. While in 2015 elections it got 2 seats, after 2017 elections it rise to 3 seats, although this was reduced to 1 in the 2022 elections.

== Electoral performance ==
Election	Proportional		Constituency		Seats	+/-	Government
Election	Votes	Share	Votes	Share	Seats	+/-	Government
1993	947	0.18	—		0 / 65	New	Extra-parliamentary
1998	3,077	0.52	—		0 / 89	0	Extra-parliamentary
2002	6,330	1.14	7,180	1.34	1 / 120	▲1	Opposition
2007	15,477	3.49	162	0.04	1 / 120	0	Opposition
2012	11,166	2.02	—		3 / 120	▲2	Coalition
2015	9,829	1.73	—		2 / 120	▼1	Opposition
2017	13,200	2.27	—		3 / 120	▲1	Opposition
2022	4,636	0.90	—		1 / 120	▼2	Opposition
