= Mpulule Political Summit =

- Leader: Remaketse Sehlabaka
- Ideology: Conservatism; Christian democracy
- Colours: Light blue
- National Assembly: 1 / 120

The Mpulule Political Summit is a small conservative political party in Lesotho. It is led by Remaketse Sehlabaka. The party holds one seat in the National Assembly.

== Election results ==
Election	Votes	Share	Seats	+/-	Government
2022	4,485	0.87	1 / 120	New	Opposition
