= Basotho Covenant Movement =

- Leader: Ts'epo Lipholo
- Ideology: Nationalism; Irredentism
- National Assembly: 1 / 120

The Basotho Covenant Movement (BCM) is a Basotho political party with a nationalist and irredentist stance. Led by Ts'epo Lipholo, the party advocates for the annexation of the South African province of Free State into Lesotho, as well as parts of the provinces of Northern Cape, Mpumalanga and KwaZulu-Natal. The BCM currently has one seat in the Basotho National Assembly, won at the 2022 Lesotho general election.
