= Alliance of Democrats (Lesotho) =

Political party in Lesotho

Alliance of Democrats Lekhotla la Kopano ea Sechaba
- Abbreviation: AD
- Leader: Ntoi Rapapa
- Founders: Kabelo Gilbert Mafura; Monyane Moleleki
- Founded: 16 December 2016
- Split from: Democratic Congress
- Headquarters: Maseru
- Ideology: Social democracy
- Political position: Centre-left
- Colours: Red; Black
- Slogan: Pele-Feela
- National Assembly: 5 / 120

Website
- ad.org.ls

The Alliance of Democrats (AD; Sotho: Lekhotla la Kopano ea Sechaba) is a political party in Lesotho.

== History ==
The party was established in December 2016 by Kabelo Gilbert Mafura and Monyane Moleleki after both were suspended by the Democratic Congress party following a failed leadership challenge against party leader and Prime Minister Pakalitha Mosisili. As well as Moleleki, several other MPs including Tjoetsane Seoka, Rethabile Marumo, Maboiketlo Maliehe, Refiloe Litjobo, Jobo Sekautu, Mokhele Moletsane, Tieho 'Mamasiane, Mokoto Hloaele, Ndiwuhleli Ndlopo se and Kotiti Liholo defected from the Democratic Congress. The party supported a motion of no confidence in Mosisili in March 2017, which led to early elections in June. The AD received 7.3% of the vote, winning nine seats and becoming the fourth largest party in parliament. The party subsequently joined a coalition government led by Tom Thabane of the All Basotho Convention. Following the 2022 election the AD reached an agreement with the newly formed Revolution for Prosperity (RFP) and with the Movement for Economic Change to form a government led by RFP's leader Sam Matekane.

== Election results ==
Election	Votes	%	Seats	+/–	Status
2017	42,686	7.34	9 / 120	New	Opposition
2022	20,798	4.04	5 / 120	▼4	Coalition
