= Lekhetho Rakuoane =

Ministers in Lesotho

Member of the National Assembly of Lesotho
- Incumbent
- Assumed office 2022

Lekhetho Rakuoane
- Born: 20 May 1960 (age 66); Mosotho, Lesotho
- Education: Bachelor's Degree in Law, National University of Lesotho
- Occupation: Politician
- Political party: Popular Front for Democracy

Lekhetho Rakuoane (born 20 May 1960) is the former Minister of Law and Justice of Lesotho. He previously served as the Minister of Tourism, Environment and Culture and Minister of Home Affairs.

== Background and education ==
Rakuoane was born in 1960 and he is from Mosotho in Lesotho. He got his high school certificate in Holy Names High School. He bagged his bachelor's degree in Law from the National University of Lesotho.

== Career ==
Rakuoane had a position in the National Assembly as the Deputy Speaker. He is also the Head of the Popular Front for Democracy.
