= Mothetjoa Metsing =

Deputy Prime Minister of Lesotho from 2012 to 2015

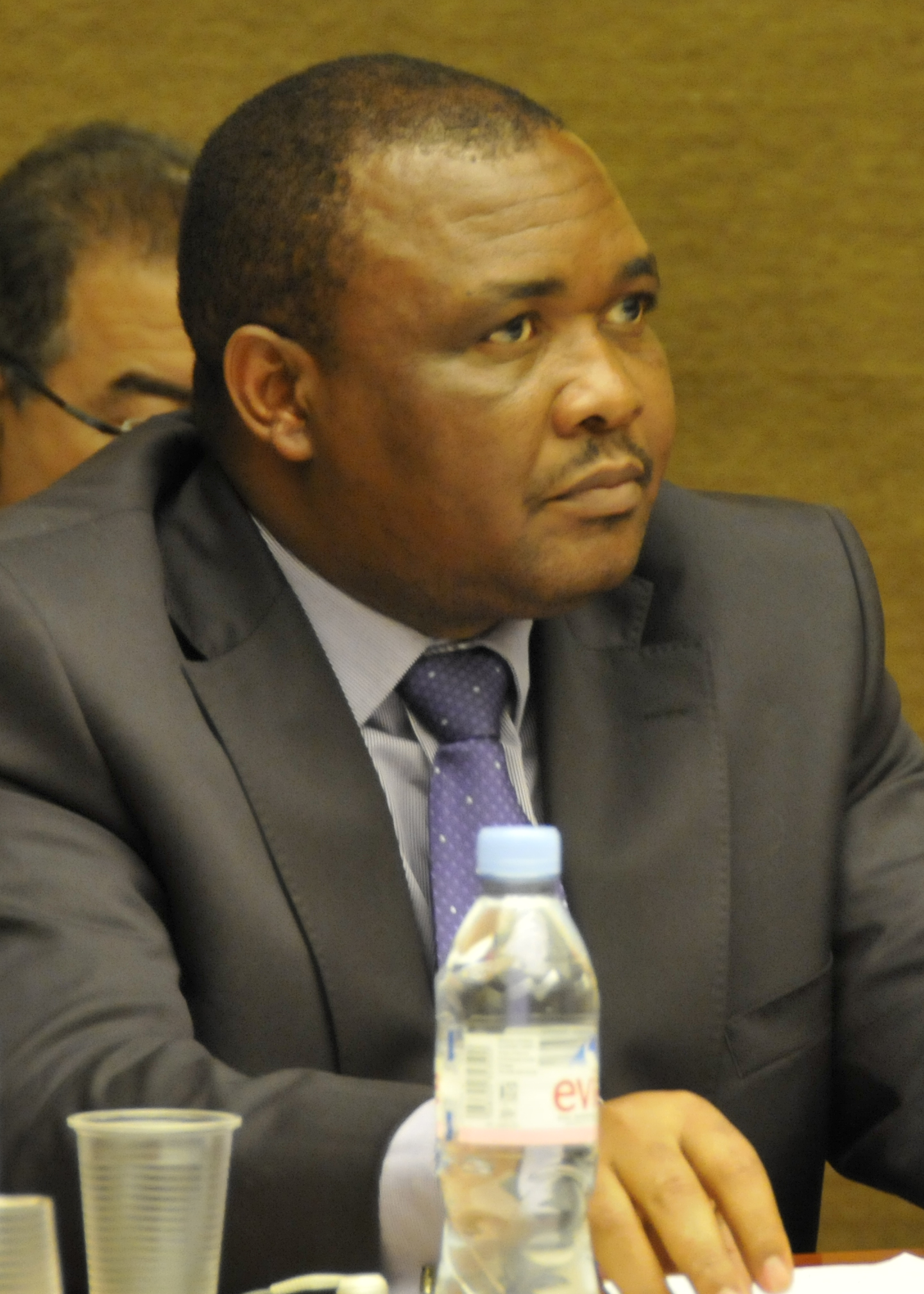

Deputy Prime Minister of Lesotho
- In office 8 June 2012 – 17 March 2015
- Monarch: Letsie III
- Prime Minister: Tom Thabane

Member of the National Assembly of Lesotho
- Incumbent
- Assumed office 28 October 2022

Personal details
- Born: 2 February 1967 (age 59) Mahobong, Leribe District, Lesotho
- Party: Lesotho Congress for Democracy
- Education: BSN (MBA)
- Website: mothetjoametsing.co.ls

Mothetjoa Metsing (born 2 February 1967) is a former Deputy Prime Minister of Lesotho. He is a member and current leader of the Lesotho Congress for Democracy (LCD). He served in the government of Prime Minister Tom Thabane between 2012 and 2015. In 2014, he was involved in controversy over an alleged coup attempt against the prime minister that was eventually resolved over calls for an early election.

== Political career ==
Before the 2012 general election, the ruling Lesotho Congress for Democracy suffered a split because of Prime Minister Pakalitha Mosisili's refusal to cede power. Mosisili then founded a new party called the Democratic Congress. LCD Secretary-General Mothetjoa Metsing then moved to lead the LCD. Tom Thabane led another faction, the All Basotho Convention, that had broken away from the LCD in 2006. The LCD's Metsing said that he would not take part in a national unity government. Similarly, the ABC ruled out working with the LCD. Yet after the election, the two parties, along with the Basotho National Party, joined hands in a coalition government.

=== Attempted coup d'état ===
Following political tensions and the suspension of parliament over the controversial change of the head of the army from Lieutenant General Kennedy Tlali Kamoli to Lieutenant General Maaparankoe Mahao, an alleged attempted coup d'état forced Thabane to flee the country. He then returned under cover of South African and Namibian police, who guarded him around-the-clock. Under the auspices of the SADC, mediation led by South African Deputy President Cyril Ramaphosa resulted in a call for an early election. Lesotho's King Letsie III set February 28, 2015, as the date for the election. Thabane was backed by the national police, while his deputy Metsing was backed by the army, which refused to recognise the change in army leadership.

On June 5, 2017, upon losing the latest round of National elections, Mr. Metsing made the following statement; "The LDF would need to be 'protected' from Prime Minister-elect Thomas Thabane who sealed an agreement yesterday with three other parties to form government.". The former deputy premier said the army needed to be "protected" for their role in propping up the outgoing government. Mr Metsing has been accused of collaborating with the LDF in his political fights, although he and the military have vehemently denied the allegations. ABC leader and former premier Thomas Thabane accused Mr Metsing of helping to plan an LDF raid on three key Maseru police stations on the morning of 30 August 2014 which the former described as a coup attempt. The raid, which left one police officer dead, triggered a chain of unsavoury events that led to the collapse of the Dr Thabane-led coalition government and intervention by the international community in an effort to avert a complete breakdown of the rule of law in Lesotho.

=== Foreign honours ===
- Italy
  - (Kingdom of the Two Sicilies) Two Sicilian Royal Family: Knight Commander of the Royal Order of Francis I
