= Movement for Economic Change =

Political party in Lesotho

Movement for Economic Change Sethala sa Kholiso ea Moruo
- Abbreviation: MEC
- Leader: Selibe Mochoboroane
- Founder: Selibe Mochoboroane
- Founded: 1 February 2017
- Split from: Lesotho Congress for Democracy
- Ideology: Anti-corruption
- Colours: Blue; Black
- Slogan: Ke Nako
- National Assembly: 4 / 120

Website
- mec.org.ls

The Movement for Economic Change (MEC; Sotho: Sethala sa Kholiso ea Moruo) is a political party in Lesotho.

== History ==
The party was established in January 2017 and announced on 1 February 2017 by Small Business Development Minister Selibe Mochoboroane, following his separation from Lesotho Congress for Democracy, of which he was secretary general appointed at the party AGM in 2015. He took a much questioned cross-bench position in parliament, claiming support of either government or opposition when necessary, with the aim of diverting political attention to economic growth and away from congress or national regimes of vengeance and divisions, but rather a nation of oneness for Basotho. He was officially released from serving as a Minister on 7 February 2017. MEC was formally registered on 9 March 2017. In the June 2017 elections the MEC received 5% of the vote, winning six seats, including a constituency seat by the leader. It landed the position of being the 4th biggest party in Lesotho after ABC, DC (with LCD) and AD. Following the 2022 election the MEC reached an agreement with the newly formed RFP and with the AD to form a government led by RFP's leader Sam Matekane.

== Election results ==
Election	Votes	Share	Seats	+/-	Government
2017	29,420	5.06	6 / 120	New	Opposition
2022	17,093	3.32	4 / 120	▼2	Coalition
