= Basotho Action Party =

- Abbreviation: BAP
- Leader: Nqosa Mahao
- Founder: Nqosa Mahao
- Founded: 21 April 2021
- Split from: All Basotho Convention
- Ideology: Social democracy Left-wing populism
- Political position: Centre-left
- Colours: Ochre; Blue; Red
- Slogan: Mafube, a rakile lilemela!
- National Assembly: 6 / 120

Website
- bap.org.ls

The Basotho Action Party is a political party in Lesotho established on 23 April 2021 by former Justice Minister and All Basotho Convention Deputy Leader Nqosa Mahao.

In the 2022 Lesotho general election, the party won 6 seats in the National Assembly.

== Election results ==
| Election | Votes | Share | Seats | +/- | Government |
|---|---|---|---|---|---|
| 2022 | 29,118 | 5.65 | 6 / 120 | New | Opposition (2022-2023) |
| 2022 | 29,118 | 5.65 | 6 / 120 | New | Coalition (2023-present) |
