= Lesotho People's Congress =

Political party in Lesotho

- Abbreviation: LPC
- Founder: Kelebone Maope
- Founded: October 8, 2001
- Split from: Lesotho Congress for Democracy
- Ideology: Mokhehleism
- Political position: Left-wing

The Lesotho People's Congress is a political party in Lesotho. It was formed as a split from the ruling Lesotho Congress for Democracy (LCD) by that party's Lesiba faction after Deputy Prime Minister Kelebone Maope resigned from the government in September 2001, and it was registered on October 8, 2001. Maope became the leader of the LPC; another leading member of the LCD, Shakhane Mokhehle, also became a leading member of the LPC. It gained 27 seats in the National Assembly through defections from the LCD. The new party closely identified itself with former prime minister Ntsu Mokhehle (brother of Shakhane Mokhehle), the founder of the LCD, and used an image of his head as its party symbol. The LCD sought to prevent the LPC from using his head as its symbol, but on December 6 the High Court ruled in favor of the LPC. In the parliamentary election for the National Assembly held on 25 May 2002, the party won 5.8% of popular votes and 5 out of 120 seats. Maope was the only LPC candidate to win a constituency, but the party won four other seats through proportional representation. Maope and Shakhane Mokhehle did not include themselves on the party's list of candidates for proportional representation, expecting to win constituencies, but Mokhehle lost his constituency by nine votes, and therefore did not get a seat in the National Assembly.
