= Revolution for Prosperity =

Political party in Lesotho

Revolution for Prosperity Thalaboliba ea Ntlafatso
- Abbreviation: RFP
- Leader: Sam Matekane
- Secretary-General: Nthati Moorosi
- Founder: Sam Matekane
- Founded: 22 March 2022
- Ideology: Social liberalism; Populism
- Colours: Purple; Green
- National Assembly: 56 / 120

Website
- rfp.org.ls

Revolution for Prosperity (RFP; Sotho: Thalaboliba ea Ntlafatso) is a social liberal political party in Lesotho led by millionaire businessman Sam Matekane.

== History ==
The party was launched by Sam Matekane on 22 March 2022.

According to the preliminary results of the 2022 Lesotho general election, the party received a plurality of seats in the country's parliament. Previously, it had been suggested that the party could achieve great success in the elections.

After the election results were announced, RFP leader Matekane announced that he would form a coalition with the Alliance of Democrats and the Movement for Economic Change. The coalition will have 65 seats in the 120-seat National Assembly.

== Election results ==
Election	Votes	Share	Seats	+/-	Government
2022	199,867	38.81	56 / 120	New	Government
