= Lesotho Congress for Democracy =

Political party in Lesotho

- Leader: Mothetjoa Metsing
- Founder: Ntsu Mokhehle
- Founded: 7 June 1997
- Split from: Basutoland Congress Party
- Headquarters: Bonhomme House, Maseru
- Ideology: Pan-Africanism; Social democracy
- Political position: Centre-left
- International affiliation: Socialist International (Observer)
- Colors: Black, Red, Green
- Slogan: Truth, Justice, Peace 'Nete, Toka, Khotso
- National Assembly: 3 / 120

Party flag
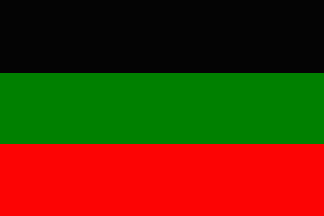

Website
- www.lcd.org.ls/

The Lesotho Congress for Democracy (LCD) is a political party in Lesotho.

== Background ==
In 1997, Prime Minister Ntsu Mokhehle left the Basutoland Congress Party to form with his faction the new Lesotho Congress for Democracy. The new party won the 1998 elections with 60.7% of the popular vote and 79 out of 80 seats. Pakalitha Mosisili became the new party leader and prime minister. At the elections for the National Assembly, 25 May 2002, the party won 54.9% of popular votes and 77 out of 120 seats. In the 17 February 2007 parliamentary election, the party won 62 out of 120 seats.

== Splits ==
Major splits from the party occurred in October 2001, when leading LCD members Kelebone Maope and Shakhane Mokhehle left the party to form the Lesotho People's Congress and in October 2006, when Tom Thabane left the party to form the All Basotho Convention. Prior to the 2012 general election, the party split up again, with incumbent Prime Minister Pakalitha Mosisili forming the Democratic Congress and General Secretary Mothetjoa Metsing taking over the LCD leadership.

== Electoral performance ==
Election	Proportional		Constituency		Seats	+/-	Government
Election	Votes	Share	Votes	Share	Seats	+/-	Government
1998	359,764	60.57	—N/a		79 / 89	New	Supermajority
2002	304,316	54.89	309,363	57.64	77 / 120	▼2	Majority
2007	did not contest		225,098	52.47	61 / 120	▼16	Majority
2012	121,076	21.94	—N/a		26 / 120	▼35	Coalition
2015	56,467	9.91	—N/a		12 / 120	▼14	Coalition
2017	52,052	8.95	—N/a		11 / 120	▼1	Opposition
2022	12,174	2.36	—N/a		3 / 120	▼8	Coalition
