= Democratic Congress =

Political party in Lesotho

- Leader: Mathibeli Mokhothu
- Founder: Pakalitha Mosisili
- Founded: 2012
- Split from: Lesotho Congress for Democracy
- Ideology: Pan-Africanism; Social democracy
- Political position: Centre-left
- Colors: Red, Green, Black
- Slogan: Nete Ke Thebe, Sechaba ke Poho!
- National Assembly: 29 / 120

Website
- www.dc.org.ls

The Democratic Congress is a political party in Lesotho that split from the Lesotho Congress for Democracy. It is led by Mathibeli Mokhothu.

== History ==
Before the 2012 election, the ruling Lesotho Congress for Democracy (LCD) split, with Prime Minister Pakalitha Mosisili leaving the party. He then founded the Democratic Congress, initially incorporating the name of LCD founder Ntsu Mokhehle into the name of the new party. LCD Secretary-General Mothetjoa Metsing subsequently moved to lead the LCD.

== Electoral performance ==
In its first election, the party won a plurality of seats, but failed to secure a majority after the allotment of proportional seats. It attempted to form a coalition government but was unsuccessful.

== Election results ==
Election	Votes	Share	Seats	+/-	Government
2012	218,366	39.58	48 / 120	New	Opposition
2015	218,573	38.37	47 / 120	▼1	Government
2017	150,172	25.82	30 / 120	▼17	Opposition
2022	128,105	24.87	29 / 120	▼1	Opposition

== Splits ==
In December 2016, Monyane Moleleki, then deputy leader of the Democratic Congress, unveiled a new political party he had formed following his and some members of DC's national executive committee's attempts at ousting Mosisili from the DC.
