= All Basotho Convention =

Political party in Lesotho

All Basotho Convention Kobo-tata ea Basotho
- Leader: Nkaku Kabi
- Founder: Tom Thabane
- Founded: October 2006
- Split from: Lesotho Congress for Democracy
- Ideology: Liberalism; Economic liberalism Civic nationalism
- Political position: Centre
- Colors: Yellow, Red, Green
- National Assembly: 8 / 120

Website
- abc.org.ls

The All Basotho Convention (ABC; Sotho: Kobo-tata ea Basotho) is a political party in Lesotho. The party was formed in October 2006 and founded by Tom Thabane, a former minister in the Lesotho Congress for Democracy (LCD) led by the government of Prime Minister Pakalitha Mosisili. Nkaku Kabi has led the party since February 2022.

== History ==
A total of 18 members of parliament crossed the floor to join the opposition ABC party on October 13, 2006; these included Thabane and 16 other former LCD members, along with one independent member, Lehlohonolo Tšehlana, who has previously been expelled from the LCD.

The 18 members of parliament joining the ABC, along with their constituencies, are:

- M. Maliehe (Butha-Buthe)
- Sello Peter Maphalla (Hlotse)
- Mokholane Pita (Maputsoe)
- Lijane Edwin Selikane (Mosalemane)
- Matooane Mokhosi (Bela-Bela)
- Clement S. Machakela (Mahlatsa)
- Mabuo Kojoana (Thupa-Kubu)
- Seeiso Simon Sehloho (Mabote)
- Mokherane Chaltin Tsatsanyane (Stadium Area)
- ’Mapheello B. Tšuluba (Qoaling)
- Molobeli Bernard Soulo (Lithoteng)
- Tom Thabane (Abia)
- Molebatsi Khaile (Qeme)
- Freddy Rantelali Shea (’Maletsunyane)
- Retšelisitsoe Ranooe (Kolo)
- Seabata Joseph Monare (Qhalasi)
- ’Nyane Mphafi (Thaba-Tseka)
- Lehlohonolo Tšehlana (Mokhotlong)

The ABC became the third largest party in the National Assembly. The ruling party was left with 61 of the 120 parliamentary seats, and the ABC leaders expected more LCD members to defect, which would have given the opposition a majority. In late November, parliament was dissolved and an early election was called for February 2007.

ABC contested the 17 February 2007 Lesotho general elections. It was anticipated that it would win the majority of the urban constituencies. The party won 17 constituency seats, falling far short of the 61 seats won by the LCD.

In the June 2017 parliamentary election, the ABC won the most seats (48 out of 120), and, with its allies, it was able to command a majority. Party leader Tom Thabane was sworn in as Prime Minister on 16 June 2017.

In recent years the party has been riddled with divisions and infighting. It initially started out as a power struggle between Thabane and his former deputy, Nqosa Mahao, who had been elected to the national executive committee (NEC) in 2019. Eventually, Mahao left the ABC and formed his own party called the Basotho Action Party in 2021 with 10 other MPs. He accused Thabane, prime minister Majoro, and ABC secretary general Lebohang Hlaele of plotting to oust him from the party. MP Tefo Mapesela also left the party and formed the Basotho Patriotic Party. The splits along with ABC MPs crossing the floor to other parties caused ABC's number of seats in the National Assembly to drop from 50 in May 2020 to only 35 by January 2022.

In 2020, Thabane stepped down as prime minister after being charged with the murder of his ex-wife, Lipolelo Thabane, although the charges were later dropped.

Thabane announced his intention to step down as leader in January 2022, citing his advanced age and ill health. He also wanted to give the party enough time to choose a successor before the upcoming elections. On 2 February, the party elected Nkaku Kabi to succeed Thabane.

== Election results ==
Election	Votes	Share	Seats	+/-	Government
2007	125,880	29.34	17 / 120	New	Opposition
2012	138,917	25.18	30 / 120	▲13	Government
2015	215,022	37.75	46 / 120	▲16	Opposition
2017	235,729	40.52	48 / 120	▲2	Government
2022	37,553	7.29	8 / 120	▼40	Opposition
