= Parliament of Lesotho =

Legislature of Lesotho

Coordinates: 29.322739542481237°S 27.49252454519462°E

Parliament of Lesotho Palamente ea Lesotho

Type
- Type: Bicameral
- Houses: Senate; National Assembly
- Seats: 153; Senate (33); National Assembly (120)

Elections
- Senate voting system: Hereditary principal chiefs and nominations made by the King
- National Assembly voting system: Mixed single vote with seat linkage system for mixed-member proportional representation: 80 single-member constituencies, 40 leveling seats

Meeting place
- Parliament building in Maseru

Website
- parliament.ls

The Parliament of Lesotho (Sotho: Paramente ea Lesotho) is the bicameral national legislature of Lesotho. It consists of the Senate and the National Assembly (lower chamber). Under the Westminster system that the Parliament follows, the National Assembly is the popularly elected lower chamber, while the Senate is the upper chamber, and consists of hereditary chiefs and members appointed by the king.

For a bill to become law, it must be passed by both chambers of Parliament.

== Structure ==
The National Assembly has 120 members, 80 of whom are elected in single member constituties using the first-past-the-post system. The remaining 40 members are elected through proportional representation and national party-lists. Elections are held at least every five years. The National Assembly has the sole power to initiate legislation, appoint the Prime Minister, and pass motions of confidence.

The Senate has 33 members, 22 of whom are hereditary tribal chiefs and the rest appointed by the king on the Prime Minister's advice. The Senate is limited in its ability to revise and delay legislation, but constitutional amendments require approval by a two-thirds majority in both chambers.

== Precursor ==
Precursors to Lesotho's Parliament lay in the pitso, the Basotho practice of popular political consultation. Established under the nation's founding father, Moshoeshoe I, major questions were discussed in such gatherings convened by a chief, where chiefs and other adult men deliberated to form a consensus on decisions to be taken.

The institutional origins of Lesotho's Parliament can be traced to the time of the Basutoland colony, where an advisory council called the Basutoland National Council first met in July 1903. The council was established to facilitate domestic consultation with the British High Commissioner for South Africa. Its membership was dominated by chiefs and members of the royal family.

== See also ==
- Politics of Lesotho
- List of legislatures by country
