= National Assembly (Lesotho) =

Lower house of the Parliament of Lesotho

Coordinates: 29.322739542481237°S 27.49252454519462°E

National Assembly Lekhotleng la Sechaba
- 11th Parliament

Type
- Type: Lower House of the Parliament of Lesotho

History
- Founded: April 1965

Leadership
- Speaker: Tlohang Sekhamane, RFP since 25 October 2022
- Deputy Speaker: Tšepang Tšita-Mosena, MEC since 25 October 2022
- Leader of the Opposition: Mathibeli Mokhothu, DC since 28 October 2022

Structure
- Seats: 120
- Political groups: Government (76): RFP (57); BAP (6); AD (4); MEC (4); LCD (3); LPC (1); HOPE (1); Opposition (44): DC (26); ABC (8); SR (2); BNP (2); PFD (1); BCM (1); MPS (1); NIP (1); UFC (1); BPP (1)
- Length of term: 5 years

Elections
- Voting system: Mixed single vote with seat linkage compensation mixed electoral system (Mixed-member proportional representation)
- Last election: 7 October 2022

Meeting place
- Parliament building in Maseru

Website
- nationalassembly.parliament.ls

The National Assembly (Sotho: Lekhotleng la Sechaba) is the lower chamber of Lesotho's bicameral Parliament.

== Composition ==
The current National Assembly has a total of 120 members. 80 members are elected in single member constituencies using the first-preference plurality (first-past-the-post) system. The remaining 40 members are elected through proportional representation and national party-lists. Members serve five-year terms.

Tlohang Sekhamane is the current Speaker of the National Assembly.

== See also ==
- Senate of Lesotho - the upper chamber of Parliament
- History of Lesotho
- List of speakers of the National Assembly of Lesotho
