= Cabinet of Sam Matekane =

Current government of Lesotho

- Cabinet of Lesotho
- Sam Matekane
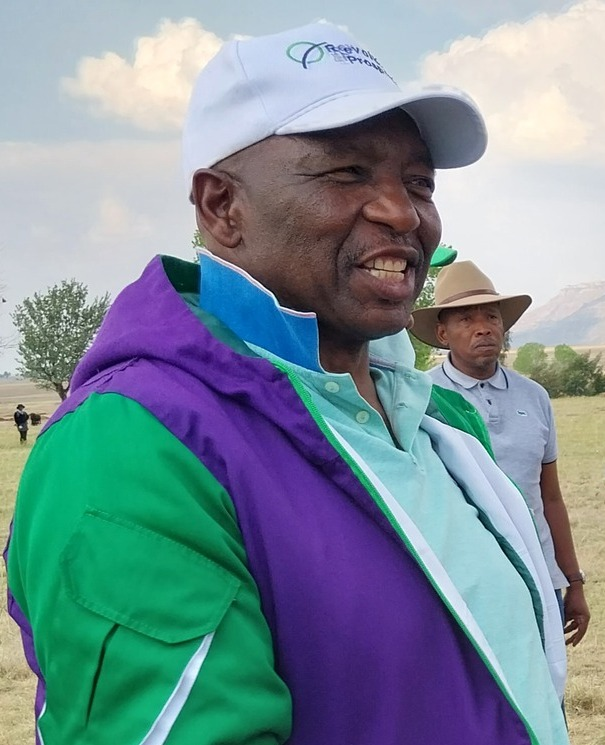
- Date formed: 4 November 2022

People and organisations
- King of Lesotho: Letsie III
- Prime Minister: Sam Matekane
- Deputy Prime Minister: Nthomeng Majara
- Total no. of members: 20
- Member parties: Revolution for Prosperity; Alliance of Democrats; Movement for Economic Change; Basotho Action Party; Lesotho Congress for Democracy; Lesotho People's Congress
- Status in legislature: Coalition government
- Opposition party: Democratic Congress
- Opposition leader: Mathibeli Mokhothu

History
- Election: 2022 general election
- Legislature terms: 11th Parliament of Lesotho
- Predecessor: Cabinet of Moeketsi Majoro

The Cabinet of Sam Matekane is the incumbent coalition government of the Kingdom of Lesotho. It was established on 4 November 2022 following the swearing-in of Prime Minister Sam Matekane on 28 October 2022. It is the fifth coalition government in Lesotho history.

== History ==
Businessman Sam Matekane's Revolution for Prosperity's won a plurality of seats in the National Assembly in the general election held on 7 October 2022. On 11 October 2022, it was announced that the RFP would form a coalition government with the Alliance of Democrats and the Movement for Economic Change. The coalition agreement between the parties were signed on 21 October 2022. The new cabinet would consists of no more than 15 ministries with the RFP being allocated control of 13 ministries while the AD and MEC would receive one minister each. Matekane was sworn in on 28 October and announced the cabinet on 4 November.

Following a failed vote of no confidence in October 2023, the Basotho Action Party joined the ruling coalition. On 8 November 2023, the cabinet was expanded to accommodate new coalition partners.

== Composition ==
Party key	Revolution for Prosperity
Party key	Alliance of Democrats
Party key	Movement for Economic Change
Party key	Basotho Action Party
Party key	Lesotho Congress for Democracy

=== October 2022–November 2023 ===
Matekane Cabinet November 2022 to November 2023
Portfolio	Minister	Term
Prime Minister	The Rt. Hon. Sam Matekane MP	October 2022–present
Minister of Defence, National Security and Environment	The Rt. Hon. Sam Matekane MP	November 2022–November 2023
Deputy Prime Minister	The Hon. Nthomeng Majara MP	November 2022–present
Minister of Justice, Law and Parliamentary Affairs	The Hon. Nthomeng Majara MP	November 2022-November 2023
Minister of Health	The Hon. Selibe Mochoboroane MP	November 2022–present
Minister of Education and Training	The Hon. Ntoi Rapapa MP	November 2022–present
Minister of Information, Communications, Science, Technology and Innovation	The Hon. Nthati Moorosi MP	November 2022–present
Minister of Finance and Development Planning	The Hon. Retšelisitsoe Matlanyane MP	November 2022–present
Minister of Trade, Industry, Business Development and Tourism	The Hon. Mokhethi Shelile MP	November 2022–November 2023
Minister of Local Government, Chieftainship, Home Affairs and Police	The Hon. Lebona Lephema MP	November 2022–present
Minister of Foreign Affairs and International Relations	The Hon. Lejone Mpotjoane MP	November 2022–present
Minister of Agriculture, Food Security and Nutrition	The Hon. Thabo Mofosi MP	November 2022–present
Minister of Natural Resources	The Hon. Mohlomi Moleko MP	November 2022–present
Minister of Gender, Youth, Sports, Arts, Culture and Social Development	The Hon. Pitso Lesaoana MP	November 2022–November 2023
Minister of Public Works and Transport	The Hon. Neo Matjato Moteane	November 2022–present
Minister of Public Service, Labour and Employment	The Hon. Richard Ramoeletsi Senator	November 2022–November 2023
Minister in the Prime Minister's Office	The Hon. Limpho Tau Senator	November 2022–present

=== November 2023–present ===
Matekane Cabinet November 2023 to present
Portfolio	Minister	Term
Prime Minister	The Rt. Hon. Sam Matekane MP	October 2022–present
Minister of Defence and National Security	The Rt. Hon. Sam Matekane MP	November 2023–present
Deputy Prime Minister	The Hon. Nthomeng Majara MP	November 2022–present
Minister of Parliamentary Affairs	The Hon. Nthomeng Majara MP	November 2023–present
Minister of Health	The Hon. Selibe Mochoboroane MP	November 2022–present
Minister of Education and Training	The Hon. Ntoi Rapapa MP	November 2022–present
Minister of Information, Communications, Science, Technology and Innovation	The Hon. Nthati Moorosi MP	November 2022–present
Minister of Finance and Development Planning	The Hon. Retšelisitsoe Matlanyane MP	November 2022–present
Minister of Trade, Industry and Small Business	The Hon. Mokhethi Shelile MP	November 2023–present
Minister of Local Government, Chieftainship, Home Affairs and Police	The Hon. Lebona Lephema MP	November 2022–present
Minister of Foreign Affairs and International Relations	The Hon. Lejone Mpotjoane MP	November 2022–present
Minister of Agriculture, Food Security and Nutrition	The Hon. Thabo Mofosi MP	November 2022–present
Minister of Natural Resources	The Hon. Mohlomi Moleko MP	November 2022–present
Minister of Gender, Youth and Social Development	The Hon. Pitso Lesaoana MP	November 2023–present
Minister of Public Works and Transport	The Hon. Neo Matjato Moteane	November 2022–present
Minister of Labour and Employment	The Hon. Ts'eliso Mokhosi Senator	November 2023–present
Minister in the Prime Minister's Office	The Hon. Limpho Tau Senator	November 2022–present
Minister of Energy	The Hon. Nqosa Mahao MP	November 2023–present
Minister of Tourism, Sports, Arts and Culture	The Hon. Motlatsi Maqelepo MP	November 2023–present
Minister of Public Service	The Hon. Mphuthi Mphuthi MP	November 2023–present
Minister of Environment and Forestry	The Hon. Letsema Adonts'i MP	November 2023–present
Minister of Law and Justice	The Hon. Richard Ramoeletsi Senator	November 2023–present

Cabinet of Lesotho
Preceded by Cabinet of Moeketsi Majoro	Government of Sam Matekane; 2022–present	Incumbent
