= Cabinet of Lesotho =

Executive organ of the Government of Lesotho

Cabinet of Ministers of Lesotho
- Kabinete ea Matona a Naha ea Lesotho

Overview
- Established: 16 March 1993 (32 years ago)
- Country: Kingdom of Lesotho
- Leader: Prime Minister
- Appointed by: King
- Ministries: 20
- Responsible to: Parliament of Lesotho
- Headquarters: Maseru
- Website: www.gov.ls

The Cabinet of Ministers (Sotho: Kabinete ea Matona) is the most senior level of the executive branch of the Government of the Kingdom of Lesotho. It consists of the Prime Minister, the Deputy Prime Minister, and the Ministers, who are appointed by the King from amongst the senators and members of the National Assembly.

== Composition ==
On 4 November 2022, the cabinet of Prime Minister Sam Matekane was sworn in. The number of ministries had been reduced from 26 to 15. The cabinet was expanded in November 2023 to accommodate the Basotho Action Party which joined the coalition government. The following table denotes the current composition of the national cabinet, as of November 2023:

Portfolio	Minister	Term
Prime Minister	The Rt. Hon. Sam Matekane MP	October 2022–present
Minister of Defence and National Security	The Rt. Hon. Sam Matekane MP	November 2023–present
Deputy Prime Minister	The Hon. Nthomeng Majara MP	November 2022–present
Minister of Parliamentary Affairs	The Hon. Nthomeng Majara MP	November 2023–present
Minister of Health	The Hon. Selibe Mochoboroane MP	November 2022–present
Minister of Education and Training	The Hon. Ntoi Rapapa MP	November 2022–present
Minister of Information, Communications, Science, Technology and Innovation	The Hon. Nthati Moorosi MP	November 2022–present
Minister of Finance and Development Planning	The Hon. Retšelisitsoe Matlanyane MP	November 2022–present
Minister of Trade, Industry and Small Business	The Hon. Mokhethi Shelile MP	November 2023–present
Minister of Local Government, Chieftainship, Home Affairs and Police	The Hon. Lebona Lephema MP	November 2022–present
Minister of Foreign Affairs and International Relations	The Hon. Lejone Mpotjoane MP	November 2022–present
Minister of Agriculture, Food Security and Nutrition	The Hon. Thabo Mofosi MP	November 2022–present
Minister of Natural Resources	The Hon. Mohlomi Moleko MP	November 2022–present
Minister of Gender, Youth and Social Development	The Hon. Pitso Lesaoana MP	November 2023–present
Minister of Public Works and Transport	The Hon. Neo Matjato Moteane	November 2022–present
Minister of Labour and Employment	The Hon. Ts'eliso Mokhosi Senator	November 2023–present
Minister in the Prime Minister's Office	The Hon. Limpho Tau Senator	November 2022–present
Minister of Energy	The Hon. Nqosa Mahao MP	November 2023–present
Minister of Tourism, Sports, Arts and Culture	The Hon. Motlatsi Maqelepo MP	November 2023–present
Minister of Public Service	The Hon. Mphuthi Mphuthi MP	November 2023–present
Minister of Environment and Forestry	The Hon. Letsema Adonts'i MP	November 2023–present
Minister of Law and Justice	The Hon. Richard Ramoeletsi Senator	November 2023–present
