= Ministry of Foreign Affairs and International Relations (Lesotho) =

Government ministry of Lesotho

- Coat of Arms of Lesotho

Agency overview
- Jurisdiction: Lesotho and its diplomatic missions worldwide
- Headquarters: Griffith Hill Road, P.O. Box 1387 Maseru 100
- Agency executives: Mpotjoane Lejone, Minister; 'Mamoliehi Moeketsi, Principal Secretary
- Website: www.foreign.gov.ls

The Ministry of Foreign Affairs and International Relations is a cabinet ministry of Lesotho in charge of conducting and designing the foreign relations of the country.

== Organization and structure ==
The ministry seeks to establish, promote and develop good relations between Lesotho and the International Community for the advancement and enhancement of Lesotho's prosperity and for the protection of its sovereignty, independence and territorial integrity.

The ministry has the following departments: Directorate of Protocol, Directorate of Political Affairs, Africa and the Middle East, Directorate of Europe and the Americas, Directorate of Asia, far East and the Pacific, Directorate of Economic and International Organizations, Directorate of Legal Affairs and Directorate of Consular Affairs.

The current minister of foreign affairs and international relations is Lejone Mpotjoane.

== List of ministers ==
This is a list of ministers of foreign affairs and international relations of Lesotho:

- 1966–1972: Leabua Jonathan
- 1972–1974: Peete Nkuebe Peter Peete
- 1974–1975: Joseph Kotsokoane
- 1975–1981: Charles Dube Molapo
- 1981–1982: Mooki Vitus Molapo
- 1982–1983: Charles Dube Molapo
- 1983–1984: Evaristus Sekhonyana
- 1984–1986: Vincent Montsi Makhele
- 1986–1988: Lengolo B. Monyake
- 1988–1990: Thaabe Letsie
- 1990–1991: Tom Thabane
- 1991–1992: Pius Tanki Molapo
- 1992–1993: Tokonye Kotelo
- 1993–1994: Molapo Qhobela
- 1994 : Evaristus Sekhonyana
- 1994–1995: Molapo Qhobela
- 1995 : Mpho Malie
- 1995–1998: Kelebone Maope
- 1998–2002: Tom Thabane
- 2002–2004: Mohlabi Tsekoa
- 2004–2007: Monyane Moleleki
- 2007–2015: Mohlabi Tsekoa
- 2015–2017: Tlohang Sekhamane
- 2017–2020: Lesego Makgothi
- 2020–2022: 'Matšepo Ramakoae
- 2022–present: Mpotjoane Lejone

== See also ==
- List of diplomatic missions of Lesotho
- List of diplomatic missions in Lesotho
