= Lesotho–Russia relations =

- Lesotho: Russia

Lesotho–Russia relations are the bilateral relations between Russia and Lesotho.

== Background ==
=== Soviet-era relations ===
The Soviet Union and the Kingdom of Lesotho established diplomatic relations on 1 February 1980. The Soviet ambassador to Mozambique was initially concurrently accredited to represent the Soviet Union's interests in Lesotho. Yuri Sepelev was appointed as the first Soviet ambassador to Lesotho, in concurrence with his posting to Maputo, on 24 April 1983, and presented his letter of credence to Basotho King Moshoeshoe II on 9 June 1983.

After a South African raid on Maseru on 9 December 1982, Lesotho began to build its relationships with the communist nations. After trips to the People's Republic of China and the Eastern Bloc in May 1983, Basotho Prime Minister Leabua Jonathan announced that China and the Soviet Union would be establishing embassies in the kingdom. The South African government responded angrily to the announcement, and reminded Jonathan of a promise he made in 1965 not to allow an embassy of any communist country in Lesotho so long as he was Prime Minister. Vincent Makhele, the Basotho Minister of Foreign Affairs, visited Moscow in September 1984 for discussions with officials in the Soviet government.

In a sign of increased KGB presence in Lesotho, staffing levels in the embassy in Maseru were increased, and in May 1985 the Soviets appointed their first resident ambassador to Lesotho. In December 1985, Makhele returned to Moscow, and signed a cultural and scientific co-operation agreement, and a technical and economic agreement, with the Soviets. Soviet inroads in Lesotho suffered a setback when Jonathan was overthrown in January 1986 in a military coup which was led by Justin Lekhanya.

== Russian Federation relations ==
=== Diplomatic ties ===
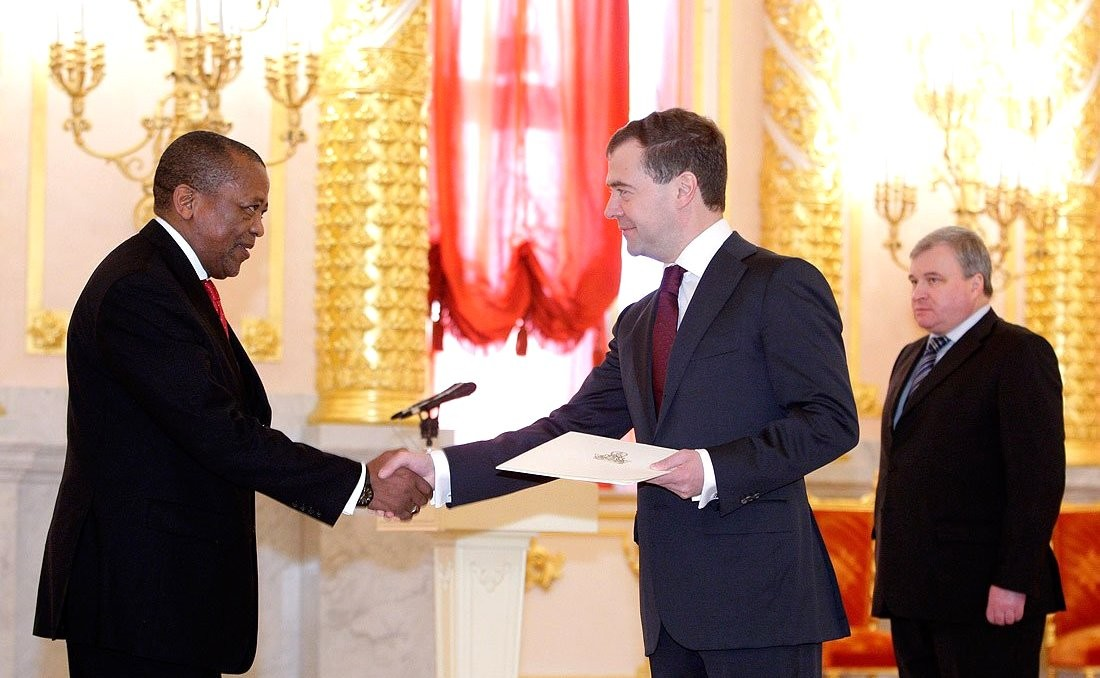
Makase Nyaphisi, until 2012 the Lesotho ambassador to Russia, presents his credentials to Dmitry Medvedev on 5 February 2010.

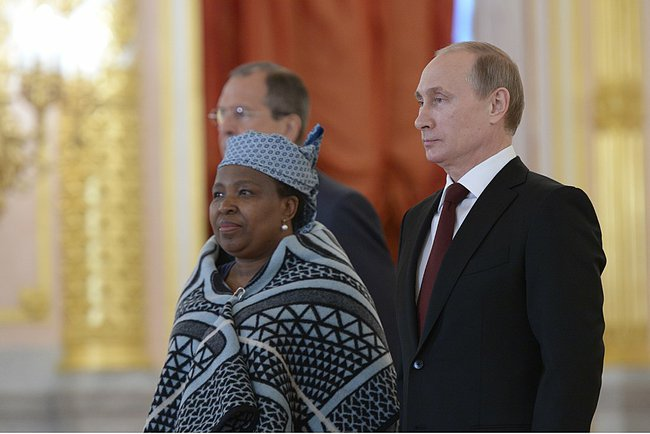
Lineo Ntoane with Vladimir Putin during her accreditation as ambassador of Lesotho to the Russian Federation on 27 June 2014

On 24 January 1992, Lesotho recognised the Russian Federation as the successor state to the Soviet Union, after the latter's dissolution. The Russian embassy in Maseru was closed in August 1992, and thereafter the Russian ambassador to South Africa has been concurrently accredited to Lesotho. Anatoly Makarov, the current Russian ambassador, presented his letters of credence to King Letsie III on 13 April 2007. Makase Nyaphisi, until 2012 the Basotho Ambassador to Russia and succeeded by Matlotliso Lineo Lydia Khechane-Ntoane, presented his credentials to Russian president Dmitry Medvedev on 5 February 2010.

=== Cultural ties ===
Since the beginning of the bilateral relationship with Lesotho, some 50 Basotho nationals have been educated in Soviet and Russian universities. Some of these graduates are employed in senior positions in the government of Lesotho, the most prominent of whom is Monyane Moleleki, the Basotho foreign minister, who graduated from Moscow State University. Since 1996, the Russian government provides to Lesotho, scholarships for three Basotho citizens to obtain basic higher education, and one scholarship for a Basotho citizen to study in graduate school.

== See also ==
- Foreign relations of Lesotho
- Foreign relations of Russia
- List of ambassadors of Russia to Lesotho
