= Visa policy of Lesotho =

Policy on permits required to enter Lesotho

Visitors to Lesotho must obtain a visa from one of the Lesotho's diplomatic missions unless they are citizens of one of the visa-exempt countries.

== Visa policy map ==
Visa policy of Lesotho Lesotho Visa not required (90 days) Visa not required (14 days) Visa required

== Visa exemption ==
=== Ordinary passports ===
Holders of ordinary passports of the following countries and territories may enter Lesotho without a visa for the following period:

90 days

- Antigua and Barbuda
- Australia
- Bahamas
- Barbados
- Belize
- Brunei
- Botswana
- Canada
- Dominica
- Eswatini
- Gambia
- Grenada
- Guyana
- Hong Kong
- Israel
- Jamaica
- Japan
- Kenya
- Kiribati
- Malawi
- Malaysia
- Maldives
- Mauritius
- Namibia
- Nauru
- Papua New Guinea
- Saint Kitts and Nevis
- Saint Lucia
- Saint Vincent and the Grenadines
- Samoa
- San Marino
- Sierra Leone
- Singapore
- Solomon Islands
- South Africa
- South Korea
- Sri Lanka
- Tanzania
- Tonga
- Trinidad and Tobago
- Tuvalu
- Uganda
- United Kingdom^{1}
- United States
- Vanuatu
- Zambia
- Zimbabwe

14 days

- All European Union member states

- Iceland
- New Zealand
- Norway
- Switzerland

_{1 - Including all classes of British nationality.}

Date of visa changes
- 1 March 1970: Israel
- 9 January 1972: Belgium, Luxembourg and Netherlands
- 15 July 1977: Japan

=== Non-ordinary passports ===
Citizens of China holding diplomatic or service passports may enter Lesotho without a visa.

== Electronic visa (e-Visa) (suspended) ==
Lesotho introduced an e-Visa system on 1 May 2017. Foreign citizens may apply for tourism, business, student and diplomatic types of visa online through the e-Visa system.

Electronic visa is processed within 72 hours. Visitors with a single-entry visa to Lesotho may remain for a maximum period of 44 days. Visitors with multiple-entry visa may travel in and out of Lesotho only within 180 days. Visitors must apply for an extension if their stay is prolonged.

Electronic visa processing via the portal has been suspended.

== Online visa ==
According to High Commission of the Kingdom of Lesotho in the UK, obtaining a visa online via email (visa-applications.immigration@gov.ls) might be possible.

== Transit ==
There are no transit facilities in Lesotho.

== Visitor statistics ==
Most visitors arriving in Lesotho were from the following countries of nationality:

Country	2017	2016	2015	2014
South Africa	1,009,856	1,081,227	970,292	968,742
Zimbabwe	20,991	20,835	20,995	20,523
Netherlands	9,275	7,856	6,223	4,454
Germany	8,913	7,955	5,951	3,746
United States	8,589	10,026	9,694	8,798
China	7,830	6,878	8,095	9,630
Botswana	7,513	8,972	6,712	6,942
United Kingdom	5,554	4,970	6,436	6,128
India	4,745	4,389	3,639	4,619
Eswatini	3,930	5,006	4,627	3,716
Total	1,137,166	1,196,214	1,082,403	1,078,510

== See also ==
- Visa requirements for Lesotho citizens
- Foreign relations of Lesotho
