= Ntlhoi Motsamai =

Mosotho politician

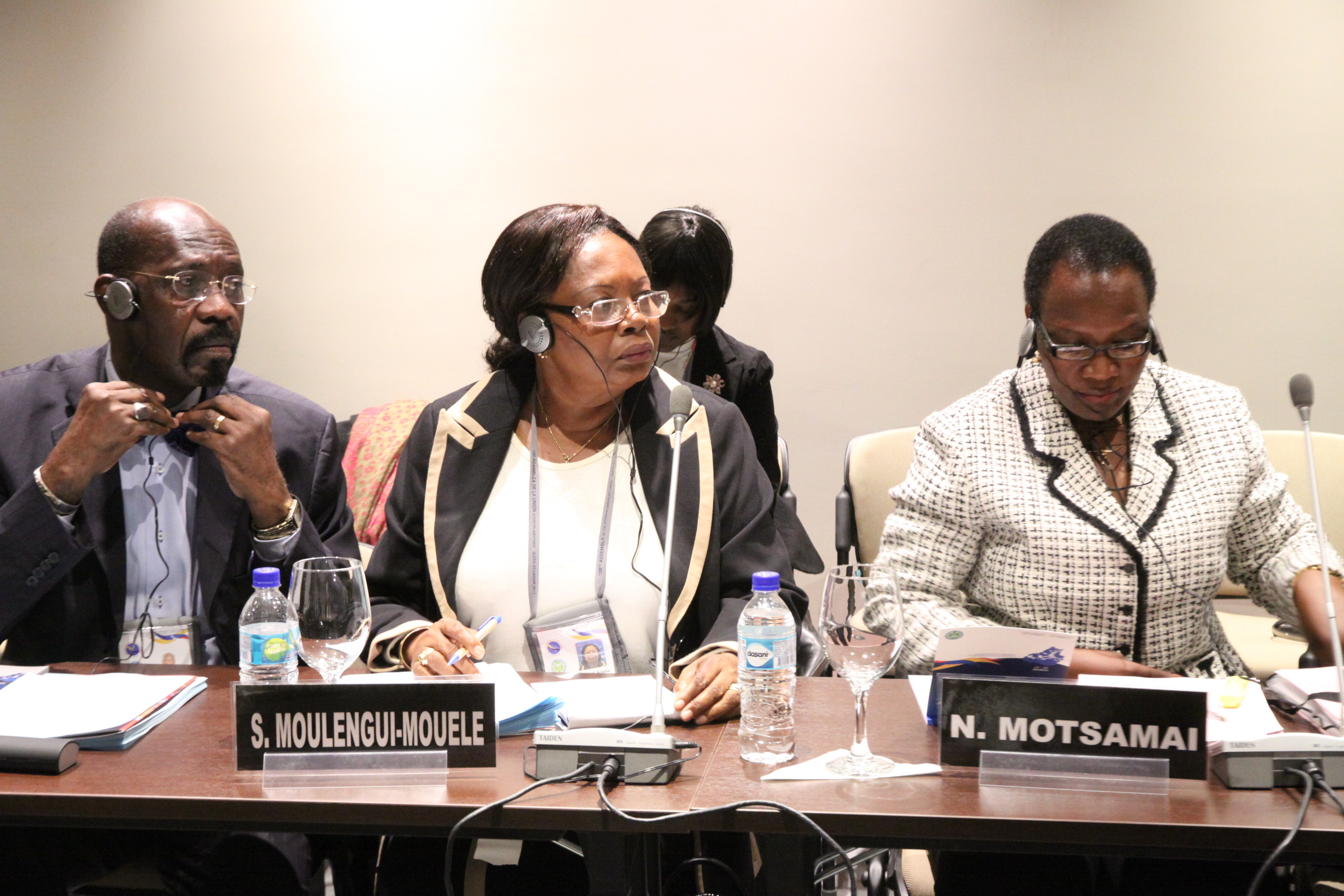

Speaker of the National Assembly of Lesotho
- In office 10 March 2015 – 3 June 2017
- Preceded by: Sephiri Motanyane
- Succeeded by: Sephiri Motanyane
- In office 1999–2012
- Preceded by: John Teboho Kolane
- Succeeded by: Sephiri Motanyane

Personal details
- Born: 1963 (age 62–63) Mohale's Hoek District, Lesotho
- Party: LCD (to 2012); Democratic Congress (from 2012)

Ntlhoi Motsamai (born 1963) is a Lesotho politician who served as the first female Speaker of the National Assembly from 1999 to 2012. She was elected again from March 2015 to June 2017. Motsamai worked as a teacher before entering politics.

== Early life ==
Motsamai was born in the remote village of Ha Pafoli, in the Mohale's Hoek District. She attended Eagle's Peak High School and then went on to study at the National University of Lesotho, graduating with a Bachelor of Science in Education (B.Sc.Ed.) degree and majoring in biology and chemistry. After her graduation, Motsamai began teaching at St. John's High School in Mafeteng. She later returned to the National University to complete a Master of Education (M.Ed.) degree, simultaneously working in the office of the dean.

== Politics ==
=== 1996–2012 ===
Motsamai entered politics in 1996, when she was elected deputy speaker of the National Assembly. Lesotho's constitution does not restrict the speakership or the deputy speakership to members of parliament, only requiring that ministers cannot be elected to those positions. Motsamai succeeded to the speakership in 1999, following the death of John Teboho Kolane. She became Lesotho's first female speaker, and was also believed to be the youngest speaker in Africa. When she took office, the National Assembly had only three female MPs.

In 2005, Motsamai nominated Bereng Sekhonyana to represent Lesotho at a SADC parliamentary reform conference in Botswana. Justin Lekhanya (the leader of the Basotho National Party) objected to her decision, and subsequently organised a series of protests at the National Assembly buildings. The assembly's privileges committee subsequently found that Lekhanya and four other BNP members had threatened and intimidated Motsamai, and recommended that they be suspended from parliament without pay for up to five months. Sekhonyana was assassinated two days after that finding was handed down.

=== 2012–present ===
In February 2012, Prime Minister Pakalitha Mosisili left the Lesotho Congress for Democracy (LCD) party to form a new party, the Democratic Congress. He was joined by 44 other members of parliament. When parliament returned, Motsamai (who had joined the new party) asked MPs to stand in the seats to show their support for Mosisili's government, and subsequently ruled that he still had control of the assembly and could thus remain in power. Her ruling was controversial, as Lesotho's electoral law prevents members elected on a party list from switching parties mid-term. Thabang Kholumo, the deputy leader of the Popular Front for Democracy, said that Motsamai's ruling was unconstitutional, as she had usurped King Letsie III's power to nominate the prime minister, while Tom Thabane, the leader of the All Basotho Convention, called for Motsamai and Mosisili to be arrested for treason.

Mosisili's government was defeated at the 2012 general election, and Motsamai was replaced as speaker by Sephiri Motanyane. She was re-elected to the speakership in March 2015, following the 2015 general election, when the Democratic Congress returned to power at the head of a coalition government. She won the speakership election 66–53, in a vote along party lines.

== See also ==
- 2014 Lesotho political crisis
- List of female speakers of national and territorial lower houses
