= List of diplomatic missions of Lesotho =

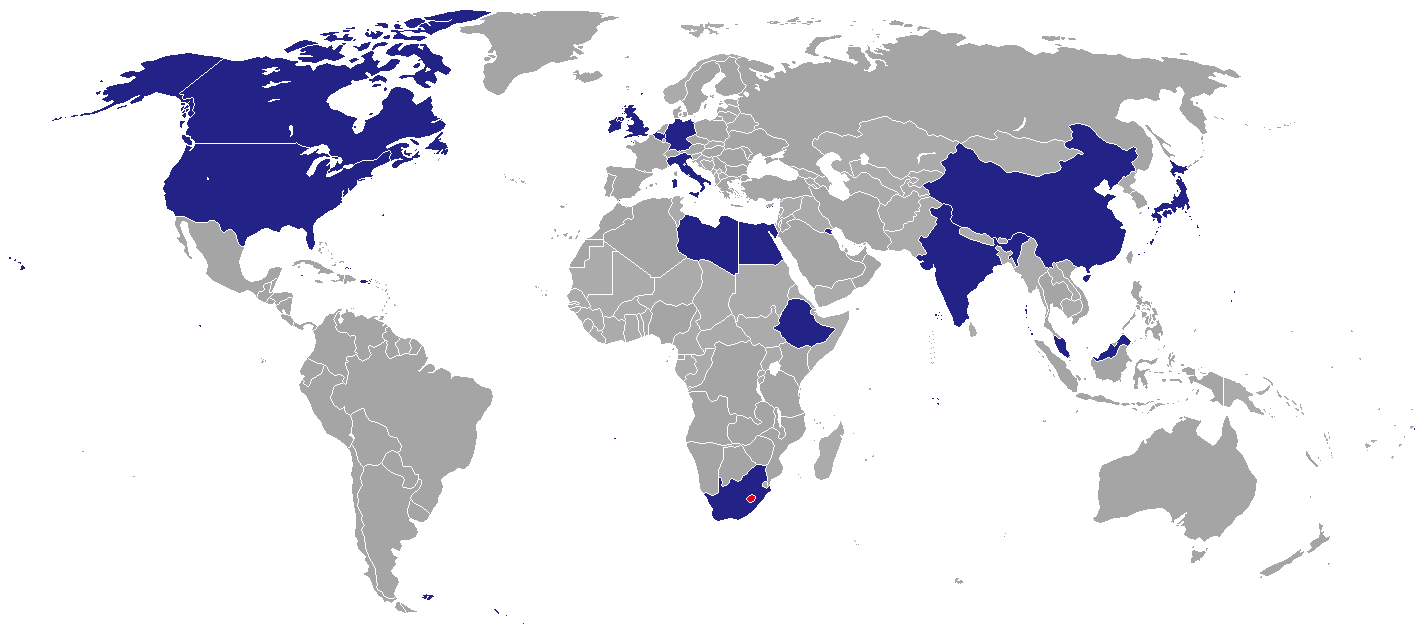
Map of Lesothan diplomatic missions

This is a list of diplomatic missions of Lesotho, excluding honorary consulates. Lesotho has a very small number of diplomatic missions.

== Current missions ==
=== Africa ===
Host country	Host city	Mission	Concurrent accreditation	Ref.
Ethiopia	Addis Ababa	Embassy	Countries: Burundi; Cameroon; Cape Verde; Central African Republic; Comoros; Djibouti; Equatorial Guinea; Gabon; Kenya; Rwanda; São Tomé and Príncipe; Somalia; Tanzania; Uganda; International Organizations: United Nations; United Nations Environment Programme; United Nations Human Settlements Programme	
South Africa	Pretoria	High Commission	Countries: Angola; Botswana; Congo-Kinshasa; Eswatini; Madagascar; Malawi; Mauritius; Mozambique; Namibia; Seychelles; Zambia; Zimbabwe; International Organizations: Southern African Customs Union; Southern African Development Community	
South Africa	Durban	Consulate-General	Countries: Angola; Botswana; Congo-Kinshasa; Eswatini; Madagascar; Malawi; Mauritius; Mozambique; Namibia; Seychelles; Zambia; Zimbabwe; International Organizations: Southern African Customs Union; Southern African Development Community	
South Africa	Johannesburg	Consulate-General	Countries: Angola; Botswana; Congo-Kinshasa; Eswatini; Madagascar; Malawi; Mauritius; Mozambique; Namibia; Seychelles; Zambia; Zimbabwe; International Organizations: Southern African Customs Union; Southern African Development Community	
South Africa	Klerksdorp	Consulate	Countries: Angola; Botswana; Congo-Kinshasa; Eswatini; Madagascar; Malawi; Mauritius; Mozambique; Namibia; Seychelles; Zambia; Zimbabwe; International Organizations: Southern African Customs Union; Southern African Development Community	
South Africa	Welkom	Consulate	Countries: Angola; Botswana; Congo-Kinshasa; Eswatini; Madagascar; Malawi; Mauritius; Mozambique; Namibia; Seychelles; Zambia; Zimbabwe; International Organizations: Southern African Customs Union; Southern African Development Community	

=== Americas ===
Host country	Host city	Mission	Concurrent accreditation	Ref.
Canada	Ottawa	High Commission	Countries: Antigua and Barbuda; Bahamas; Barbados; Costa Rica; Cuba; Dominica; Dominican Republic; Grenada; Guyana; Haiti; Jamaica; Saint Lucia; Saint Kitts and Nevis; Saint Vincent and the Grenadines; Trinidad and Tobago	
United States	Washington, D.C.	Embassy	Countries: Argentina; Belize; Bolivia; Brazil; Chile; Colombia; Ecuador; El Salvador; Guatemala; Honduras; Mexico; Nicaragua; Panama; Paraguay; Peru; Suriname; Uruguay; Venezuela; International Organizations: International Monetary Fund; World Bank	

=== Asia ===
Host country	Host city	Mission	Concurrent accreditation	Ref.
China	Beijing	Embassy	Countries: Cambodia; Laos; Myanmar; North Korea; Pakistan; Singapore	
India	New Delhi	High Commission	Countries: Afghanistan; Bangladesh; Bhutan; Kyrgyzstan; Maldives; Nepal; Sri Lanka; Tajikistan; Turkmenistan; Uzbekistan; Vietnam	
Japan	Tokyo	Embassy	Countries: Fiji; Kiribati; Nauru; New Zealand; Papua New Guinea; Philippines; Samoa; Solomon Islands; South Korea; Tonga; Tuvalu; Vanuatu	
Kuwait	Kuwait City	Embassy	Countries: Bahrain; Eritrea; Egypt; Iraq; Iran; Jordan; Lebanon; Oman; Qatar; Sahrawi Republic; Saudi Arabia; Sudan; Syria; United Arab Emirates; Yemen; International Organizations: Arab Bank for Economic Development in Africa; OPEC Fund for International Development	
Malaysia	Kuala Lumpur	High Commission	Countries: Indonesia; Thailand	

=== Europe ===
Host country	Host city	Mission	Concurrent accreditation	Ref.
Belgium	Brussels	Embassy	Countries: Luxembourg; Netherlands; International Organizations: European Union; International Criminal Court; International Court of Justice; Organisation of African, Caribbean and Pacific States; UNIDO; World Customs Organization	
Germany	Berlin	Embassy	Countries: Armenia; Austria; Azerbaijan; Belarus; Estonia; France; Georgia; Holy See; Latvia; Lithuania; Monaco; Moldova; Poland; Russia; Ukraine; International Organizations: International Atomic Energy Agency; UNESCO; UNIDO	
Ireland	Dublin	Embassy	Countries: Denmark; Finland; Iceland; Norway; Sweden	
Italy	Rome	Embassy	Countries: Albania; Bulgaria; Croatia; Czechia; Greece; Hungary; Israel; Montenegro; North Macedonia; Romania; San Marino; Serbia; Slovakia; Turkey; International Organizations: Food and Agriculture Organization; International Fund for Agricultural Development; World Food Programme	
United Kingdom	London	High Commission	Countries: Cyprus; Malta; Portugal; Spain; International Organizations: Commonwealth of Nations; UN Tourism	

=== Multilateral organisations ===
Organization	Host city	Host country	Mission	Concurrent accreditation	Ref.
United Nations	New York City	United States	Permanent Mission		
United Nations	Geneva	Switzerland	Permanent Mission	Countries: Liechtenstein; Switzerland; International Organizations: Group of 15, All UN Specialized Agencies in Geneva, WIPO, International Labour Organization; International Telecommunication Union; United Nations Trade and Development; Universal Postal Union; World Health Organization; World Intellectual Property Organization; World Meteorological Organization; World Trade Organization	

== Gallery ==
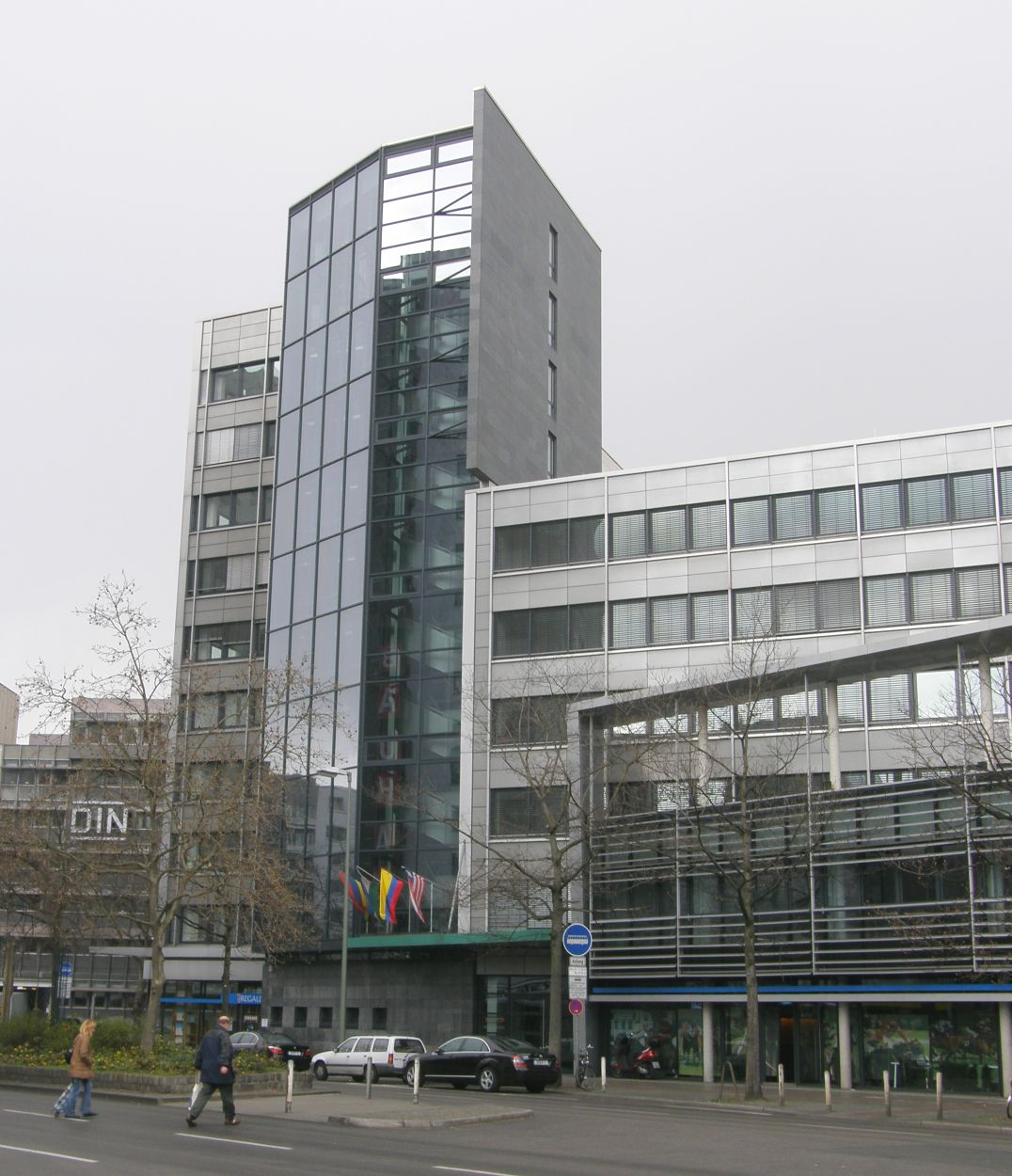
Embassy in Berlin

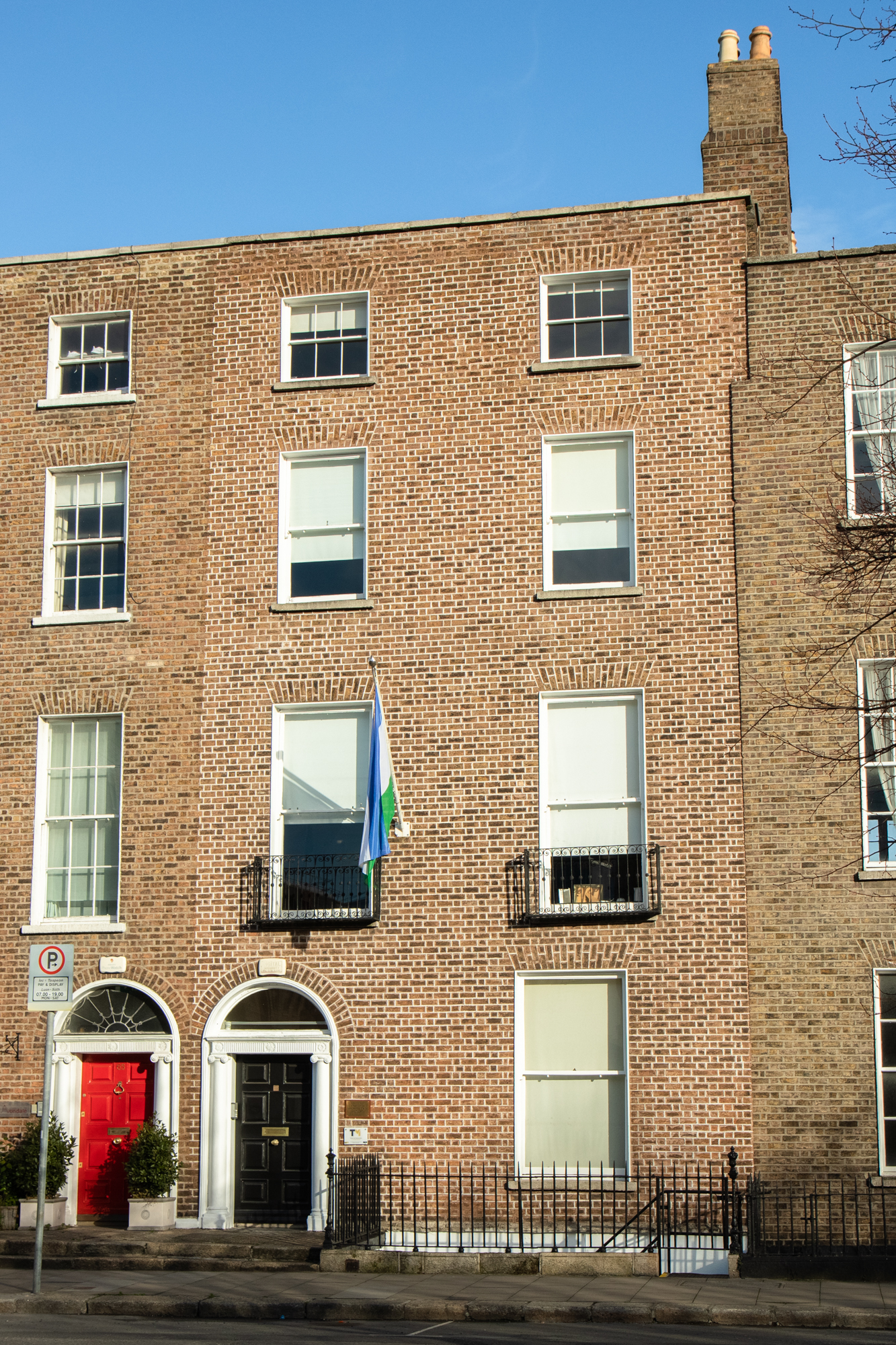
Embassy in Dublin

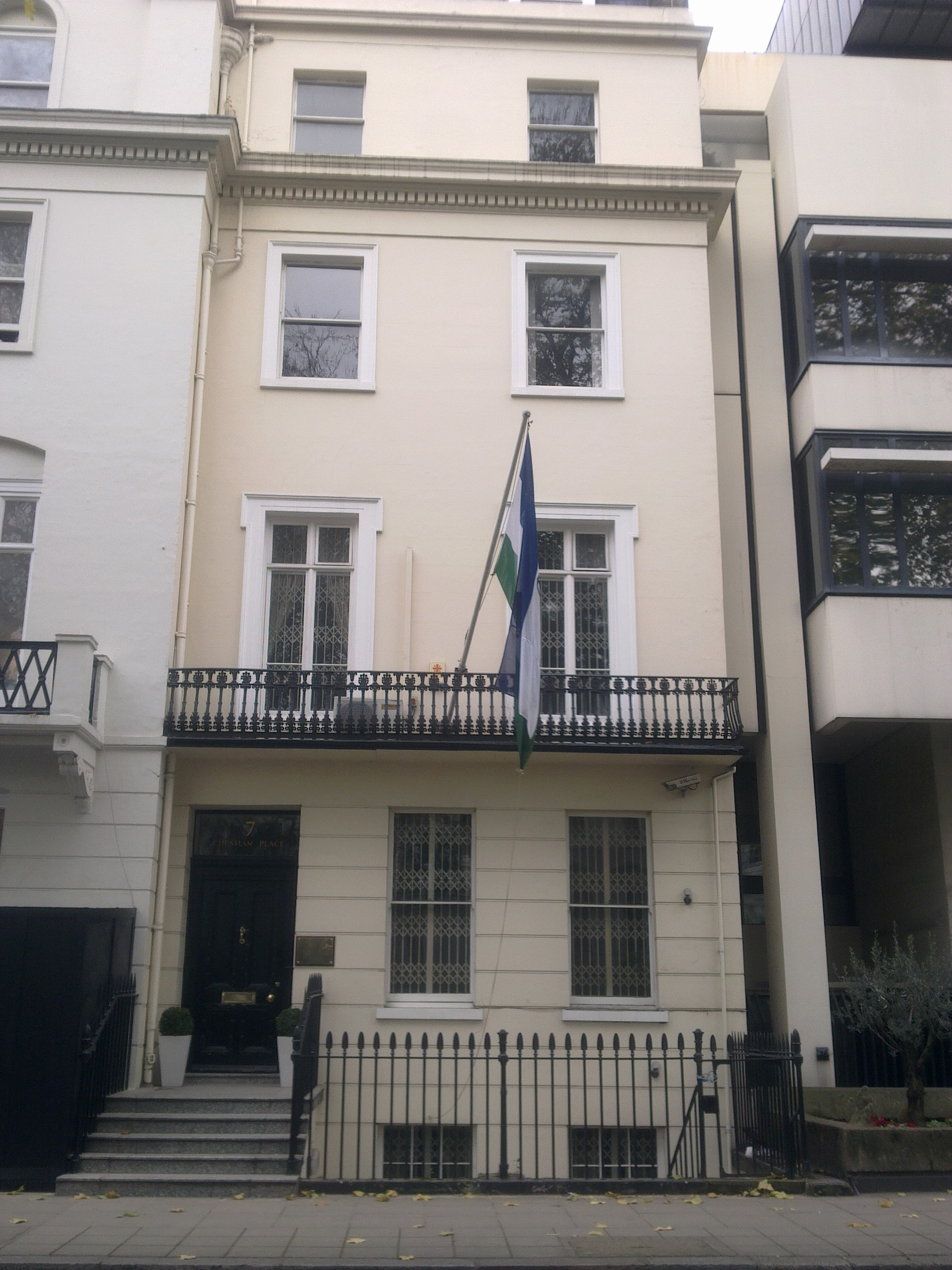
High Commission in London

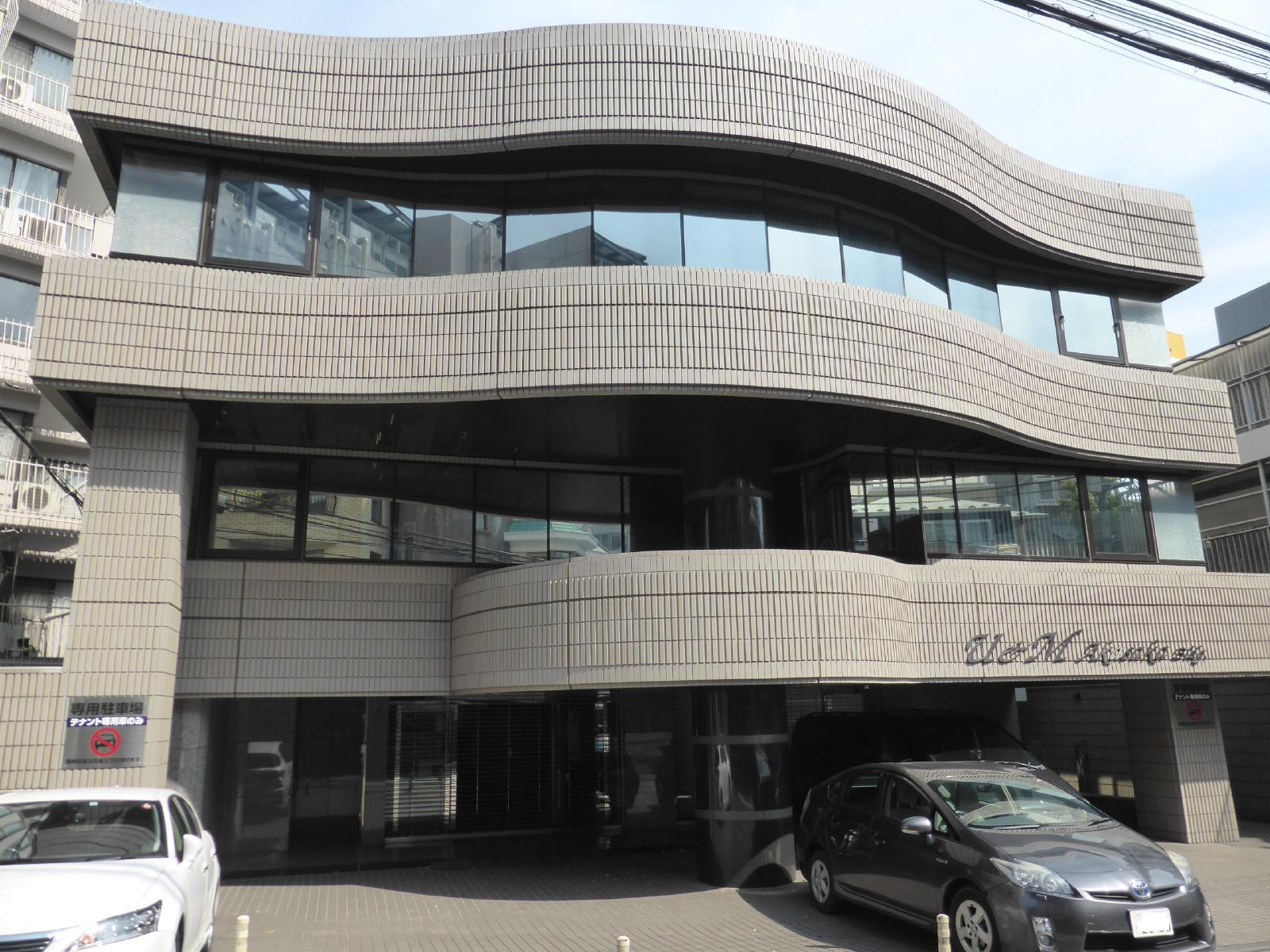
Embassy in Tokyo

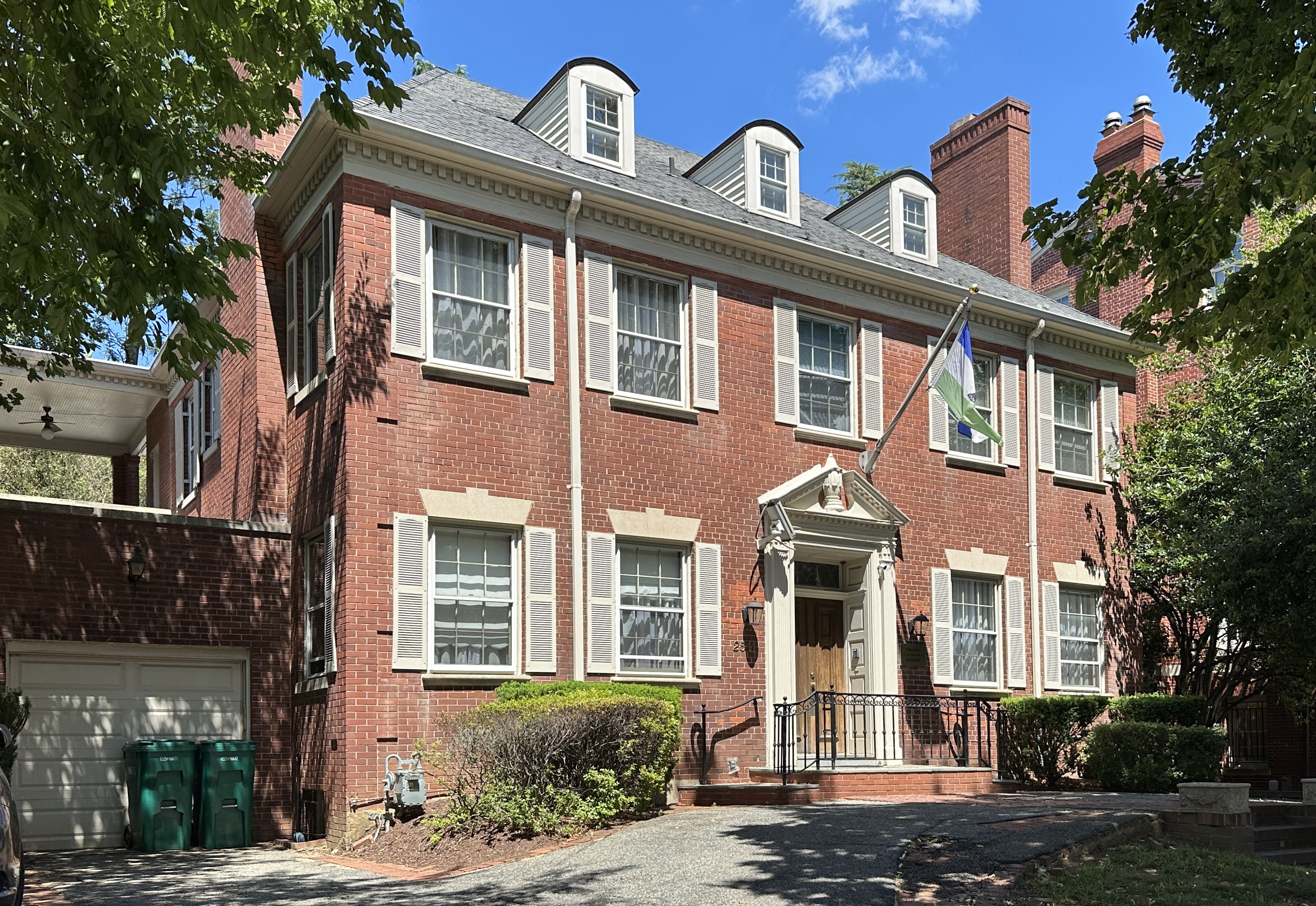
Embassy in Washington, D.C.

== Closed missions ==
=== Africa ===
Host country	Host city	Mission	Year closed	Ref.
Libya	Tripoli	Embassy	Unknown	

=== Europe ===
Host country	Host city	Mission	Year closed	Ref.
Denmark	Copenhagen	Embassy (Note: Resident in Dublin, Ireland)	2005	

== See also ==
- Foreign relations of Lesotho
- List of diplomatic missions in Lesotho
- Visa policy of Lesotho
