= Tlohang Sekhamane =

Mosotho politician (born 1955)

Speaker of the National Assembly of Lesotho
- Incumbent
- Assumed office 25 October 2022
- Prime Minister: Sam Matekane
- Deputy: Tšepang Tšita-Mosena
- Preceded by: Sephiri Motanyane

Personal details
- Born: Tlohang Joel Sekhamane; 30 May 1955 (age 71) Mokhotlong District, Lesotho
- Party: Revolution for Prosperity
- Occupation: Politician

Tlohang Sekhamane is a politician from Lesotho who is serving as the Speaker of the National Assembly since October 2022.

== Biography ==
Sekhamane was born on 30 May 1955 in Mokhotlong District. He was a member of National Assembly of Lesotho from June 2012 to March 2015. He was in the cabinet Minister of Foreign Affairs and International Relations from March 2015 to November 2016, and then as Minister of Finance from November 2016 to June 2017.
