= Lesotho–United States relations =

- Lesotho: United States

Lesotho–United States relations are bilateral relations between the Kingdom of Lesotho and the United States of America.

== Historical relations ==
The United States was one of the first four countries to establish an embassy in Maseru after Lesotho gained its independence from the United Kingdom in 1966. Since this time, Lesotho and the United States have consistently maintained positive bilateral relations. In 1996, the United States closed its bilateral aid program in Lesotho. The Southern African regional office of the U.S. Agency for International Development (USAID) in Gaborone, Botswana now administers most of the U.S. assistance to Lesotho, which totalled approximately $54 million in FY 2016. Total U.S. aid to Lesotho is over $73 million, including humanitarian food assistance. The Peace Corps has operated in Lesotho since 1967. About 100 Peace Corps volunteers concentrate in the sectors of agriculture, health and education. The Government of Lesotho encourages greater American participation in commercial life and welcomes interest from potential U.S. investors and suppliers.

== Economic relations ==
In July 2007, the Government of Lesotho signed a compact with the Millennium Challenge Corporation to provide $362.5 million in support to develop Lesotho's water sector, healthcare infrastructure, and private sector. The compact ended in September 2013, with approximately 1 million people expecting to benefit from its investments.

In January 2025, the second Trump administration ordered the cut of most American foreign aid programs. This had a disastrous effect upon Lesotho's health care system, which heavily depended on American aid.

In April 2025, during the reorganization of US tariffs, Lesotho received a 50% tariff, the highest rate of any country. Most exports to the US come in the form of textiles to be made in Jeans, including in the brand Levi Strauss & Co. These tariffs added to the economic stresses caused by the foreign aid cuts to Lesotho earlier in the year.

The country reached a new foreign aid agreement with the United States on the 10th of December. The former agreed to invest $232 million in Lesotho's health care system. In exchange, Lesotho agreed to invest at least $132 million. This deal was part of a larger effort by the Trump administration to procure bilateral aid agreements that differ from the multilateral approach taken by the World Health Organization and differ from traditional USAID delivery methods. The United States has signed similar deals with 16 other African countries as of March 2026. The deal was criticized by 21 civil society organizations in Lesotho who argued the deal threatened "national sovereignty" and lacked transparency.

== Political relations ==
In 2025, during a speech to congress, Donald Trump insulted Lesotho, claiming it is "a country nobody has heard of", while announcing the ending of a foreign aid program. The Minister of Foreign Affairs Lejone Mpotjoane condemned his words, and added that close Trump associate Elon Musk has business interests in Lesotho. Mpotjoane said he was "shocked" to hear a head of state "refer to another sovereign state in this manner" when the two countries had previously had "warm and cordial" relations, according to the spokesperson for the Ministry of Foreign Affairs.

Principal U.S. Officials include:

- Deputy Chief of Mission / Chargé d'affaires ad interim - Keisha Toms Boutaleb

== See also ==
- Foreign relations of the United States
- Foreign relations of Lesotho
- List of ambassadors of Lesotho to the United States
