= 'Matšepo Ramakoae =

Mosotho politician (born 1954)

The Honourable 'Matšepo Ramakoae MP
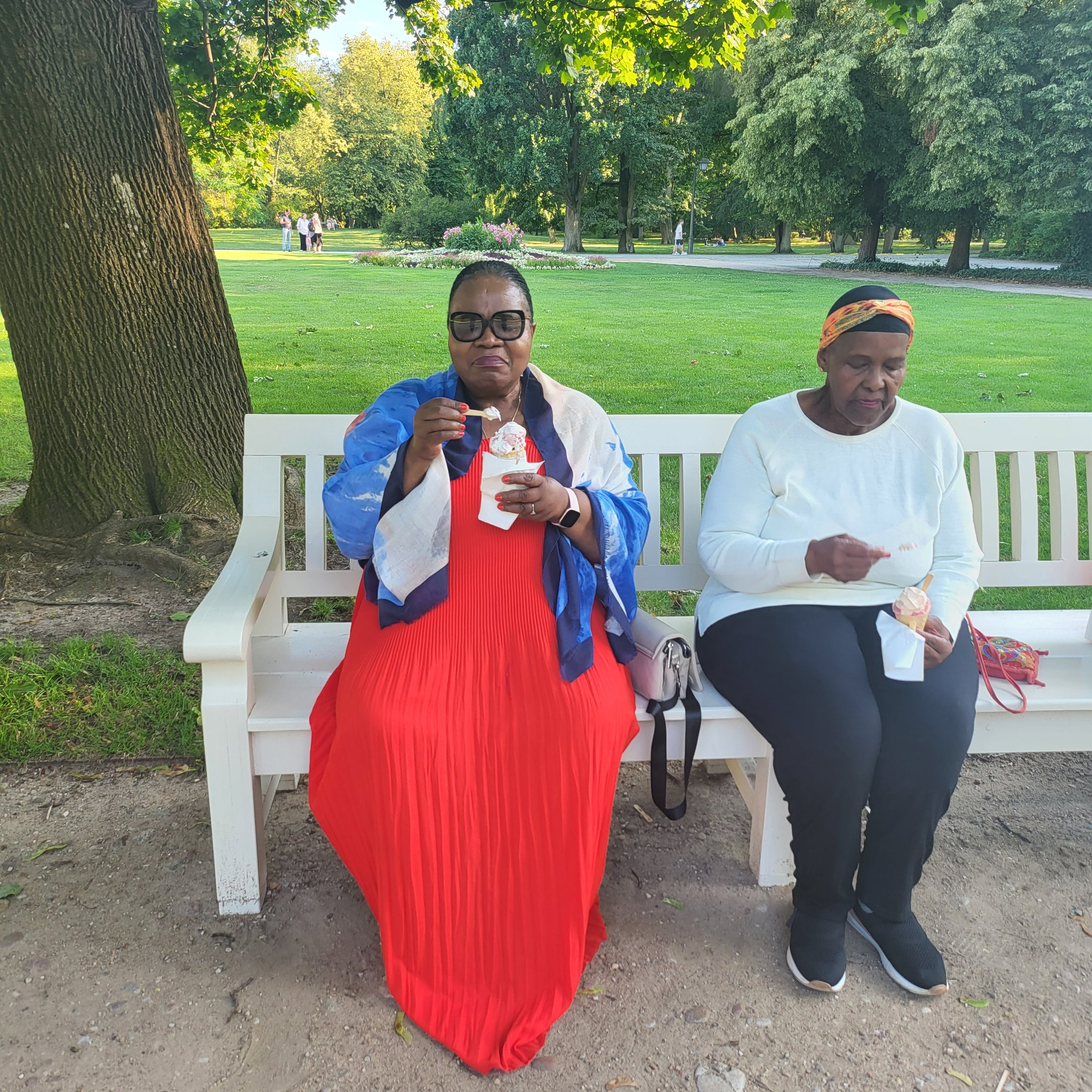
- Ramakoae in 2024

Minister of Foreign Affairs and International Relations
- In office 21 May 2020 – 27 October 2022
- Prime Minister: Moeketsi Majoro
- Preceded by: Lesego Makgothi
- Succeeded by: Mpotjoane Lejone

Personal details
- Born: 'Matšepo Molise; 5 March 1954 (age 72) Morija, Basutoland
- Party: All Basotho Convention
- Children: 1
- Education: National University of Lesotho
- Profession: Politician

'Matšepo Ramakoae (née Molise; born 3 March 1954) is a Mosotho politician. She was serving as the Minister of Foreign Affairs and International Relations from May 2020 to October 2022. She is the legislator from the Matsieng constituency No. 45. Ramakoae served as the Deputy Minister of Finance from 2012 until 2015.

== Early life and career ==
'Matšepo Molise was born on 3 March 1954 in Morija as the second out of nine children of James Koko Molise and 'Mamolise Molise. Her father worked as a miner in South Africa, while her mother was the domestic worker of French missionaries. Molise attended Lesotho High School in Maseru. Soon after finishing school, she married and took her husband's surname.

She started her professional career as a civil servant. She attained a degree in accounting and went on to attend the National University of Lesotho, from which she graduated with a Bachelor of Commerce in 1981. From then on, she was employed in the office of the Prime Minister. At the same time, she attended management courses in the United Kingdom and Sweden. In 1991, she obtained a master's degree in Policy Analysis in the Netherlands. Around this time, she separated from her husband. Upon her return from the Netherlands, she was appointed to the Auditor General's office where she worked in the performance audit department. In 1999, she began working as a principal secretary in the newly established Ministry of Defence. She was the first woman to work in the department and was primarily responsible for the budget.

== Political career ==
In 2006, Ramakoae joined the newly founded All Basotho Convention. She left public service and ran as the ABC candidate in the Matsieng constituency in the 2007 election. She lost to the Lesotho Congress for Democracy candidate. She then started working as a farmer and ran a catering service. Politically, she was active at the ABC's grassroots level.

In the 2012 election, she ran again in the Matsieng constituency. She won this time and was sworn in as a Member of the National Assembly. Prime Minister Thomas Thabane named her the Deputy Minister of Finance in his first cabinet. The coalition government collapsed in 2015 and was voted out in the subsequent general election. She lost re-election as an MP, but won the constituency back in the 2017 general election. She was selected to head the parliamentary committee for women's issues.

In early-2020, Thabane came under pressure to resign as Prime Minister due to his alleged involvement in his former spouse's murder. Ramakoae was considered a strong contender, but was ultimately not selected as the party chose Finance Minister Moeketsi Majoro to succeed Thabane. Majoro was sworn in on 20 May. He appointed her Minister of Foreign Affairs and International Relations in his cabinet. She took office on 21 May. Ramakoae is the first woman to hold this role.
