= Lesotho–United Kingdom relations =

Relations between Lesotho and the United Kingdom

- Lesotho: United Kingdom

Diplomatic mission
- High Commission of Lesotho, London: High Commission of the United Kingdom, Maseru

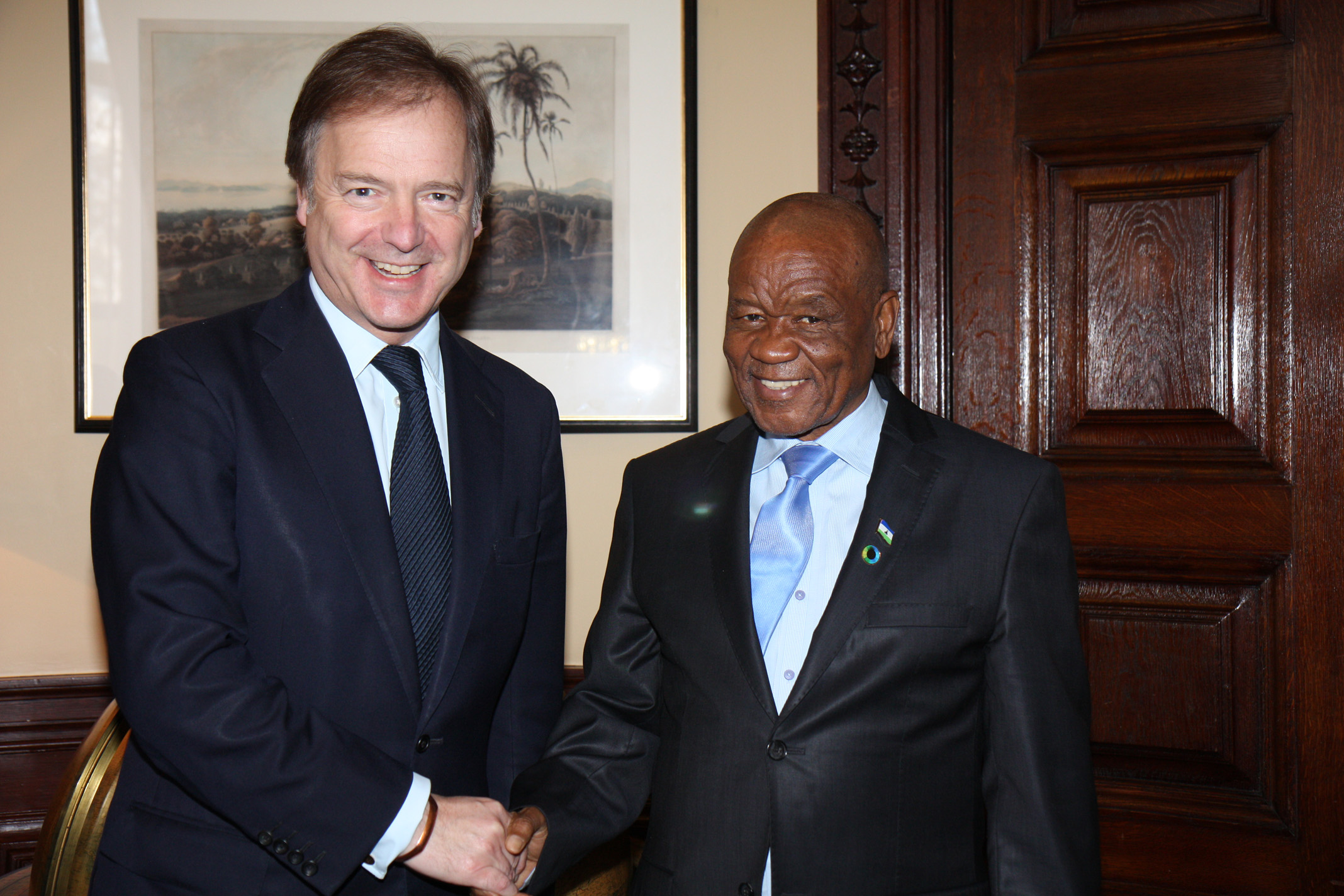
British Foreign Office Minister Hugo Swire with Masotho Prime Minister Tom Thabane in London, April 2014.

Lesotho–United Kingdom relations are the bilateral and foreign relations between the Kingdom of Lesotho and the United Kingdom of Great Britain and Northern Ireland. Upon Lesotho's independence, the two countries established diplomatic relations on 4 October 1960.

Both countries share common membership of the Commonwealth and the World Trade Organization, as well as the SACUM–UK Economic Partnership Agreement. Bilaterally the two countries have an Investment Agreement.

== History ==
The UK governed Lesotho from 1868 to 1966, when it achieved full independence.

== Economic relations ==
From 4 February 2018 until 30 December 2020, trade between Lesotho and the UK was governed by the Southern African Customs Union–European Union Economic Partnership Agreement, while the United Kingdom was a member of the European Union.

Following the withdrawal of the United Kingdom from the European Union, the UK and the 'Southern Africa Customs Union and Mozambique', a trade bloc of which Lesotho is a member, signed a continuity trade agreement on 9 October 2019, based on the EU free trade agreement; the agreement entered into force on 1 January 2021. Trade value between the 'Southern Africa Customs Union and Mozambique' and the United Kingdom was worth £12,539 million in 2022.

== Diplomatic missions ==
As Commonwealth nations, Lesotho and the United Kingdom are accredited to each other through high commissions.

- Lesotho maintains a high commission in London.
- The United Kingdom is accredited to Lesotho through its high commission in Maseru.

== See also ==
- Foreign relations of Lesotho
- Foreign relations of the United Kingdom
- Southern Africa Customs Union and Mozambique–United Kingdom Economic Partnership Agreement
