= Ministry of Finance (Lesotho) =

Ministry for finance in Lesotho

The Ministry of Finance of Lesotho is responsible for the public finances of Lesotho.

== Ministers of Finance ==
- Benedict Leseteli, 1965-1967
- Peete Nkuebe Peete, 1967-1971
- Evaristus Sekhonyana, 1971-1981
- Khetla Rakhetla, 1981-1985
- Peete Nkuebe Peete, 1986
- Evaristus Sekhonyana, 1986-1991
- Abel Leshele Thoahlane, 1991-1994
- Moeketsi Senaoana, 1995-1996
- Victor Ketso, 1996-1999
- Kelebone Albert Maope, 1999-2001
- Mohlabi Tsekoa, 2001-2002
- Timothy Thahane, 2002-2012
- Victor Ketso, 2012-2015
- 'Mamphono Khaketla, 2015-2016
- Tlohang Sekhamane, Nov 2016 - June 2017
- Moeketsi Majoro, 2017-2020
- Thabo Sophonea, 2020-2022
- Retselisitsoe Matlanyane, 2022–Present

== See also ==
- Finance ministry
- Economy of Lesotho
- Politics of Lesotho
