= Lesotho passport =

Passport issued to citizens of Lesotho

- Lesotho passport front cover
- Type: Passport
- Issued by: Lesotho
- First issued: 1 January 2006 (current version)
- Purpose: Identification
- Eligibility: Basotho citizenship
- Expiration: 10 years

Lesotho passports are issued to citizens of Lesotho to travel outside the country.

== See also ==
- Visa requirements for Lesotho citizens
- List of passports
