= Evaristus Sekhonyana =

Lesotho politician

Evaristus Rets'elisitsoe Sekhonyana (1937 – 18 November 1998) was a Lesotho politician and diplomat who served in a number of cabinet positions during the kingdom's history, including Minister of Foreign Affairs (1983–1984; 1994). Among other positions he held was minister of justice. Sekhonyana had also served as the leader of the Basotho National Party, which ruled the country from the 1986 military coup until the 1990s.

He was Minister of Finance from 1971 to 1981, and from 1986 to 1991.

== Foreign minister ==
Sekhonyana served as foreign minister in the government of Prime Minister Leabua Jonathan from 1983 to 1984. In 1986, when a military coup brought General Justin Lekhanya to power, Sekhonyana was the only former cabinet minister from Jonathan's government to be allowed in the new regime. Sekhonyana travelled to South Africa and attempted to negotiate an end to the country's blockade of Lesotho with Pik Botha, the South African foreign minister, which had been imposed because Jonathan had been supporting African National Congress rebels.

Following the "royal coup" by King Letsie III against Lesotho's democratically elected government in August 1994, Sekhonyana was appointed as foreign minister again. Sekhonyana claimed that the elected Prime Minister Ntsu Mokhehle attempted to request a South African military intervention in Lesotho without informing the king and parliament, which he described as "treason" and the reason for his removal.
