= Ministry of Justice (Lesotho) =

Government ministry of Lesotho

The Ministry of Justice, Human Rights & Correctional Services of Lesotho aims to dispense and oversee the administration of justice, protection and the promotion of human rights, as well as the rehabilitation of offenders. To fulfill its mandate, the ministry delivers justice and accessibility via the effective uses of correctional resources and the provision of skills. Lastly, the ministry employs a zero tolerance approach to corruption and the vulnerable segments of the population that are subjected to violations of human rights.

== List of ministers (Post-1966 upon achieving independence) ==
- Peete Nkuebe Peete (1966-1967)
- Benedict Leseteli (1967-1968)
- Gabriel Manyeli (1972)
- Julius Monaleli (1973-1974)
- Charles D. Molapo (1974-1975)
- Gerald P. Ramoreboli (1975-1983)
- Nathaniel Nkuatsana (1983-1985)
- Moupo Mathaba (1985-1986)
- Bernnett Khaketla (1986-1990)
- Kelebone Maope (1990-1995)
- Molapo Qhobela (1995-1996)
- Sephiri Motanyane (1997-1999)
- Shakane Mokhehle (1999-2003)
- Refiloe M. Masemene (2003-2007)
- Mpeo Mahase-Moiloa (2007-2012) [1st female]
- Hae Phoofolo (2012-2013)
- Mophato Monyake (2013-2014)
- Motlohi Maliehe (2014-2015)
- Moeketse Malebo (2015-2016)
- Mahali Phamotse (2017-present)

== See also ==
- Justice ministry
- Politics of Lesotho
