= Visa requirements for Lesotho citizens =

Administrative entry restrictions

Visa requirements for Lesotho citizens are administrative entry restrictions by the authorities of other states placed on citizens of Lesotho. As of 2026, Lesotho citizens had visa-free or visa on arrival access to 73 countries and territories, ranking the Lesotho passport 61st in terms of travel freedom according to the Henley Passport Index.

== Visa requirements map ==
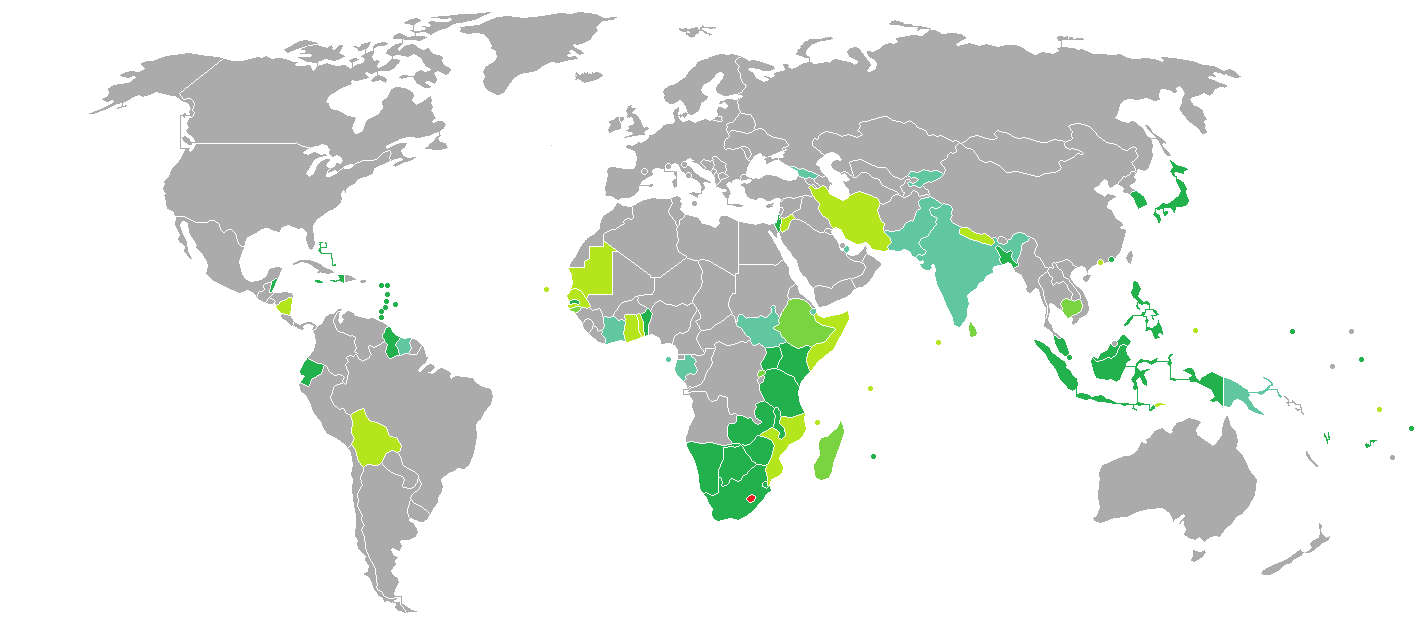
Visa requirements for Lesotho citizens Lesotho Visa free access Visa on arrival eVisa Visa available both on arrival or online Visa required

== Visa requirements ==
Country	Visa requirement	Allowed stay	Notes (excluding departure fees)
Afghanistan	eVisa		Visa is not required for Holders of a valid multiple-entry Schengen, UK or US visa has been previously used once or residence permit of Ireland, Schengen, UK, US or UAE 10 years.
Albania	eVisa		90 days visa free if hold a multiple-entry visa or a residence permit issued by a Schengen area country, United States, Cyprus, Ireland or the United Kingdom
Algeria	Visa required		Visa Issuance for passengers with a boarding authorization traveling as tourists to cities in the south of Algeria (Timimoun, Ghardaia, Ilizi, Djanet or Tamanraset) can obtain a visa on arrival for a maximum of 30 days. They must have: a return/onward ticket, a hotel reservation confirmation.
Andorra	Visa required		Multiple Schengen visa will cover entry.
Angola	Visa not required	90 days	Maximum 3 entries per calendar year: 30 days per trip, but no more than 90 days within any 1 calendar year for tourism purposes only.; Visitors must have a return/onward ticket and a hotel reservation confirmation.; An International Certificate of Vaccination is required.
Antigua and Barbuda	Visa not required	6 months	
Argentina	Visa required		The AVE (High Speed Travel) is open to Lesotho citizens holding valid, current ordinary passports traveling to Argentina for tourism. To do so, they must hold a valid category B2/J/B1/O/P (P1-P2-P3)/E/H-1B visa issued by the United States of America.
Armenia	Visa required		
Australia and territories	Visa required		May apply online (Online Visitor e600 visa).
Austria	Visa required		
Azerbaijan	Visa required		
Bahamas	Visa not required	3 months	
Bahrain	eVisa / visa on arrival	2 weeks	
Bangladesh	Visa not required	90 days	
Barbados	Visa not required	6 months	
Belarus	Visa required		
Belgium	Visa required		
Belize	Visa not required		
Benin	Visa not required	90 days	
Bhutan	eVisa	90 days	May be accessed online.; Visa fee is 40 USD per person and visa application may be processed within 5 business days with duration of stay of 90 days.; e-Visa applicant is also subject to pay Sustainable Development Fee
Bolivia	eVisa / Visa on arrival	90 days	
Bosnia and Herzegovina	Visa required		30 days visa free if hold valid multiple entry visa holders and residents of Ireland, Schengen Area member states, and United States of America
Botswana	Visa not required	90 days	
Brazil	Visa required		
Brunei	Visa required		
Bulgaria	Visa required		
Burkina Faso	eVisa	1 month	
Burundi	Visa on arrival	1 month	
Cambodia	eVisa / Visa on arrival	30 days	
Cameroon	eVisa		
Canada	Visa required		US permanent residents (Green card) holders can enter visa free
Cape Verde	Visa on arrival	30 days	Visa on arrival at Sal, Boa Vista, São Vicente or Santiago international airports.; Requirement to register online 5 days before arrival; Also pay the airport security fee of CVE 3400 either online or on arrival.
Central African Republic	Visa required		
Chad	eVisa	90 days	
Chile	Visa required		
China	Visa required		
Colombia	eVisa	90 days	
Comoros	Visa on arrival	45 days	
Republic of the Congo	Visa required		
Democratic Republic of the Congo	eVisa	90 days	
Costa Rica	Visa required		90 days visa free if hold a valid, multiple-entry visa or residence permit issued by Canada, the United States or only residence permit issued by European Union, Iceland, Norway, Switzerland or the United Kingdom
Côte d'Ivoire	eVisa		e-Visa holders must arrive via Port Bouet Airport.
Croatia	Visa required		
Cuba	eVisa	90 days	
Cyprus	Visa required		
Czech Republic	Visa required		
Denmark	Visa required		
Djibouti	eVisa	31 days	
Dominica	Visa not required	6 months	
Dominican Republic	Visa required		90 days visa free if hold a valid visa or residence card of any member state of the Schengen Area, Canada, Cyprus, Ireland, the United Kingdom or the United States
Ecuador	Visa not required	90 days	
Egypt	Visa required		
El Salvador	Visa required		Visa not required for holders of a valid visa issued by Canada, the United States or a Schengen member state.
Equatorial Guinea	eVisa		e-Visa holder must arrive via Malabo International Airport
Eritrea	Visa required		
Estonia	Visa required		
Eswatini	Visa not required	30 days	
Ethiopia	eVisa / Visa on arrival	up to 90 days	Visa on arrival is obtainable only at Addis Ababa Bole International Airport.; e-Visa holders must arrive via Addis Ababa Bole International Airport.; e-Visa is available for 30 or 90 days.
Fiji	Visa not required	4 months	
Finland	Visa required		
France	Visa required		
Gabon	eVisa		Electronic visa holders must arrive via Libreville International Airport.
Gambia	Visa not required	90 days	
Georgia	eVisa	30 days	30 days per 120 days period
Germany	Visa required		
Ghana	Visa not required	60 days	
Greece	Visa required		
Grenada	Visa not required	3 months	
Guatemala	Visa required		Holders of a valid visa issued by Canada, United States, or a Schengen member state are visa exempt.
Guinea	eVisa		
Guinea-Bissau	eVisa / Visa on arrival	90 days	
Guyana	Visa not required	14 days	
Haiti	Visa not required	3 months	
Honduras	Visa required		90 days visa free if hold a valid visa issued by Canada, United States, or a Schengen member state are visa exempt.
Hungary	Visa required		
Iceland	Visa required		
India	e-Visa	60 days	e-Visa holders must arrive via 32 designated airports (Note: Ahmedabad; Amritsar; Bagdogra; Bengaluru; Bhubaneswar; Chandigarh; Chennai; Coimbatore; Delhi; Gaya; Goa-Dabolim; Goa-Manohar; Guwahati; Hyderabad; Indore; Jaipur; Kannur; Kochi; Kolkata; Kozhikode; Lucknow; Madurai; Mangaluru; Mumbai; Nagpur; Port Blair; Pune; Surat; Thiruvananthapuram; Tiruchirappalli; Varanasi; Visakhapatnam) or 5 designated seaports. (Note: Chennai; Cochin; Mormugao (Goa); Mumbai; Mangalore); An Indian e-Tourist Visa may only be obtained twice within 1 calendar year.; Foreigners of Pakistani origin or who hold a Pakistani Passport are not eligible for an e-Visa. Foreigners who are not Pakistani nationals, but whose parents or grandparents (either paternal or maternal) were born in, or were permanent residents in Pakistan, are also not eligible for an e-Visa.
Indonesia	Visa required		
Iran	eVisa/ Visa on arrival	30 days	
Iraq	eVisa	30 days	
Ireland	Visa required		Transit visa is also required
Israel	Electronic travel authorization	90 days	
Italy	Visa required		
Jamaica	Visa not required	180 days	
Japan	Visa not required	90 days	Visa not required for visits up to 90 days using the Lesothan passports with the Machine-readable passport according of Here
Jordan	eVisa / Visa on arrival	30 days	40 Jordanian Dinar fee of charge; Conditions apply.
Kazakhstan	eVisa		
Kenya	Electronic Travel Authorisation	90 days	Applications can be submitted up to 90 days prior to travel and must be submitted at least 3 days in advance.; eTA fee is USD 32.50.; eTA is good for single entry, but visitors who leave Kenya to other EAC countries may re-enter provided that their eTA is still valid; Proof of reservation at the hotel where visitors plan to stay is required (if staying with friends, an invitation letter is also acceptable).; Yellow fever vaccination certificate is required if coming from endemic countries.; Can also
Kiribati	Visa not required	90 days	
North Korea	Visa required		
South Korea	Korean Electronic Travel Authorization	60 days	
Kuwait	Visa required		e-Visa can be obtained for holders of a Residence Permit issued by a GCC member state under the following conditions: To be 18 years old and over.; The residence permit for a GCC state must be valid for at least another 3 months.; To be accompanied by the sponsor of the residence permit if the sponsor is an individual.; Does not apply to holders of a GCC Student Visa and Non-Skilled Worker Visa
Kyrgyzstan	eVisa	30 days or 60 days	
Laos	Visa required		Visitor hold an official letter of guarantee issued by the Ministry of Foreign Affairs of Laos can be picked visa on arrival
Latvia	Visa required		
Lebanon	Visa required		In addition to a visa, an approval should be obtained from the Immigration department of the General Directorate of General Security (La Surete Generale).
Liberia	eVisa		
Libya	eVisa	30 days	
Liechtenstein	Visa required		
Lithuania	Visa required		
Luxembourg	Visa required		
Madagascar	eVisa / Visa on arrival	90 days	
Malawi	Visa not required	90 days	
Malaysia	Visa not required	30 days	
Maldives	Free visa on arrival	30 days	
Mali	Visa required		
Malta	Visa required		
Marshall Islands	Visa required		
Mauritania	eVisa	30 days	Available at Nouakchott–Oumtounsy International Airport.
Mauritius	Visa not required	180 days	180 days per calendar year
Mexico	Visa required		180 days visa free if hold a valid visa or permanent resident card of Canada, Japan, Schengen Area, the UK or the US, or permanent resident card of Chile or Colombia
Micronesia	Visa not required	30 days	
Moldova	eVisa		Visa free if they hold a valid residence permit, a valid 'C'-type, or a valid 'D'-type visa issued by a Schengen member state or a European Union member state
Monaco	Visa required		
Mongolia	eVisa	30 days	
Montenegro	Visa required		30 day visa free if Hold a valid foreign travel documents containing a valid Schengen visa, a valid visa of Australia, Japan, Canada, New Zealand, Ireland, the United States and the United Kingdom
Morocco	Visa required		May apply for an e-Visa if holding a valid visa or a residency document issued by one of the following countries: Schengen Area, Australia, Canada, Ireland, New Zealand, United Kingdom, United States a residency document issued by Cyprus, Japan, United Arab Emirates.
Mozambique	eVisa / Visa on arrival	30 days	
Myanmar	Visa required		
Namibia	Visa not required	90 days	
Nauru	Visa required		Criminal record and medical fitness certificates are not required for citizens of Lesotho.
Nepal	eVisa / Visa on arrival	30 days	
Netherlands	Visa required		
New Zealand	Visa required		Holders of an Australian Permanent Resident Visa or Resident Return Visa may be granted a New Zealand Resident Visa on arrival permitting indefinite stay (pursuant to the Trans-Tasman Travel Arrangement), subject to meeting character requirements and obtaining an Electronic Travel Authority prior to departure.
Nicaragua	Visa on arrival	30 days	
Niger	Visa required		
Nigeria	eVisa / Visa on arrival	90 days	
North Macedonia	Visa required		15 days visa free if hold a valid Type "C" multiple-entry visa for the Schengen Area or a temporary/permanent residence permit of an EU Member State
Norway	Visa required		
Oman	eVisa		
Pakistan	eVisa		
Palau	Free visa on arrival	30 days	
Panama	Visa required		30 days visa free if hold a multiple-entry visa valid for at least 6 months at the time of entry, or permanent residency documents issued by Australia, Canada, Japan, Singapore, South Korea, the Schengen Area, the United Kingdom or the United States
Papua New Guinea	Easy Visitor Permit	30 days	
Paraguay	Visa required		
Peru	Visa required		
Philippines	Visa not required	30 days	
Poland	Visa required		
Portugal	Visa required		
Qatar	eVisa		
Romania	Visa required		
Russia	Visa required		
Rwanda	eVisa / Visa on arrival	30 days	May apply online.; Can also be entered on an East Africa tourist visa issued by Kenya or Uganda
Saint Kitts and Nevis	Visa not required	3 months	
Saint Lucia	Visa not required	6 weeks	
Saint Vincent and the Grenadines	Visa not required	3 months	
Samoa	Free Entry Permit on arrival	60 days	
San Marino	Visa required		
São Tomé and Príncipe	eVisa		Visa is obtained online.
Saudi Arabia	Visa required		Tourist visa on arrival for holders of a valid multiple entry visa from US, UK or Schengen area, under the condition that the multiple entry visa has been used at least once, proving that by showing the entry and exit stamps of the country of issuance.
Senegal	Visa on arrival	90 days	
Serbia	Visa required		90 days visa free if hold of valid visa or residents of the Cyprus, Ireland, Schengen Area member states, United Kingdom or the United States
Seychelles	Free Visitor's Permit on arrival	3 months	
Sierra Leone	eVisa / Visa on arrival	1 month	
Singapore	Visa not required	30 days	
Slovakia	Visa required		
Slovenia	Visa required		
Solomon Islands	Visa required		
Somalia	eVisa	30 days	
South Africa	Visa not required	30 days	
South Sudan	eVisa		Obtainable online; Printed visa authorization must be presented at the time of travel
Spain	Visa required		
Sri Lanka	ETA / Visa on arrival	30 days	The standard visitor visa allows a stay of 60 days within any 6-month period.; Visa fees (for Standard visitor visa): SAARC - USD 35; Non SAARC - USD 75; e-Visa categories will be charged an additional USD 18.50 service fee.; If transiting from any of the Sri Lankan airports, An e-Visa is exempted (2 day transit period).
Sudan	Visa required		
Suriname	Visa not required		
Sweden	Visa required		
Switzerland	Visa required		
Syria	eVisa		
Tajikistan	eVisa	45 days	
Tanzania	Visa not required	90 days	
Thailand	eVisa	60 days	
Timor-Leste	Visa on arrival	30 days	
Togo	eVisa	15 days	
Tonga	Visa required		
Trinidad and Tobago	Visa not required		
Tunisia	Visa required		
Turkey	Visa required		e-Visa can be obtained if holding a multiple entry visa or a residence permit from any of the Schengen countries, USA, UK or Ireland.
Turkmenistan	Visa required		
Tuvalu	Free visa on arrival	1 month	Free of charge.
Uganda	Visa not required	3 months	
Ukraine	Visa required		
United Arab Emirates	eVisa	30 days	May apply online.; May apply also using 'Smart service'.
United Kingdom and Crown dependencies	Visa required		
United States	Visa required		
Uruguay	Visa required		
Uzbekistan	Visa required		
Vanuatu	Visa not required	120 days	
Vatican City	Visa required		Open borders but de facto follows Italian visa policy.
Venezuela	Visa required		
Vietnam	eVisa	90 days	30 days visa free when visit Phu Quoc Island
Yemen	Visa required		
Zambia	Visa not required	90 days	
Zimbabwe	Visa not required	3 months	

== Dependent, Disputed, or Restricted territories ==
Unrecognized or partially recognized countries

Territory	Conditions of access	Notes
Abkhazia	Visa required	
Kosovo	Visa not required	90 days
Northern Cyprus	Visa not required	
Palestine	Visa not required	Arrival by sea to Gaza Strip not allowed.
Sahrawi Arab Democratic Republic		Undefined visa regime in the Western Sahara controlled territory.
Somaliland	Visa on arrival	30 days for 30 US dollars, payable on arrival.
South Ossetia	Visa not required	Multiple entry visa to Russia and three day prior notification are required to enter South Ossetia.
Taiwan	Visa required	
Transnistria	Visa not required	Registration required after 24h.

Dependent and autonomous territories

Territory	Conditions of access	Notes
China
Hong Kong	Visa not required	14 days
Macau	Visa on arrival	30 days
Denmark
Faroe Islands	Visa required	
Greenland	Visa required	
France
French Guiana	Visa required	
French Polynesia	Visa required	
(France) French West Indies	Visa required	Includes overseas departments of Guadeloupe and Martinique and overseas collectivities of Saint Barthélemy and Saint Martin.
Mayotte	Visa required	
New Caledonia	Visa required	
Réunion	Visa required	
Saint Pierre and Miquelon	Visa required	
Wallis and Futuna	Visa required	
Netherlands
Aruba	Visa required	
Caribbean Netherlands	Visa required	Includes Bonaire, Sint Eustatius and Saba.
Curaçao	Visa required	
Sint Maarten	Visa required	
New Zealand
Cook Islands	Visa not required	31 days
Niue	Visa not required	30 days
Tokelau	Visa required	
United Kingdom
Akrotiri and Dhekelia	Visa required	
Anguilla	eVisa	
Bermuda	Visa required	
British Indian Ocean Territory	Special permit required	Special permit required.
British Virgin Islands	Visa not required	
Cayman Islands	Visa not required	6 months
Falkland Islands	Visa required	
Gibraltar	Visa required	
Montserrat	Visa not required	6 months
Pitcairn Islands	Visa not required	14 days visa free and landing fee 35 USD or tax of 5 USD if not going ashore.
Ascension Island	eVisa	3 months within any year period
Saint Helena	eVisa	
Tristan da Cunha	Permission required	Permission to land required for 15/30 pounds sterling (yacht/ship passenger) for Tristan da Cunha Island or 20 pounds sterling for Gough Island, Inaccessible Island or Nightingale Islands.
South Georgia and the South Sandwich Islands	Permit required	Pre-arrival permit from the Commissioner required (72 hours/1 month for 110/160 pounds sterling).
Turks and Caicos Islands	Visa not required	90 days
United States
American Samoa	Visa required	
Guam	Visa required	
Northern Mariana Islands	Visa required	
Puerto Rico	Visa required	
U.S. Virgin Islands	Visa required	
Antarctica and adjacent islands
Special permits required for Bouvet Island, British Antarctic Territory, French Southern and Antarctic Lands, Argentine Antarctica, (Australia) Australian Antarctic Territory, (Antártica Chilena Province) Chilean Antarctic Territory, (Australia) Heard Island and McDonald Islands, (Norway) Peter I Island, (Norway) Queen Maud Land, (New Zealand) Ross Dependency.

== See also ==
- Visa policy of Lesotho
- Lesotho passport
