= Mosalemane =

Mosalemane is a constituency in Lesotho with 14,001 registered voters. The constituency was won in 1965 by Basotho National Party (BNP) member J K Rampeta. In 1970 it was won also by BNP even though the 1970 elections were marred by violence. In 1993 Lijane Selikane won the election as member of the Basutoland Congress Party (BCP). He further won it in 1998 and 2002 under a new party Lesotho Congress for Democracy (LCD).

In 2007 Liau Ntlele won the elections under LCD and he won it again in 2012 under a new party Democratic Congress (DC). In the latest election Samuel Tsoinyana Rapapa won the constituency in 2015 and 2017 Elections under the All Basotho Convention (ABC). In 2022 elections, Ntoi Rapapa won the constituency under Alliance for Democrats (AD).
