= List of speakers of the National Assembly of Lesotho =

List of speakers of the National Assembly of Lesotho.

The National Assembly was established in 1965 and was preceded by Basutoland National Council. Walter P. Stanford was the speaker of the National Council from 1961 to 1965. Below is a list of office-holders:

Name	Took office	Left office	Notes
Walter P. Stanford	1965	1970	First post-independent speaker
In abeyance	1970	27 April 1973	
John Teboho Kolane	27 April 1973	20 January 1986	Speaker of the Interim National Assembly
Dissolved	20 January 1986	1990	
John Teboho Kolane	1990	1992	Speaker of the National Constituent Assembly
John Teboho Kolane	1993	1999	Died in office
Ntlhoi Motsamai	1999	2012	First female speaker
Sephiri Enoch Motanyane	6 June 2012	2015	
Ntlhoi Motsamai	10 March 2015	12 June 2017	
Sephiri Enoch Motanyane	12 June 2017	25 October 2022	
Tlohang Sekhamane	25 October 2022	Incumbent	
