= Lesego Makgothi =

Lesotho diplomat

Lesego Calayel Makgothi (born 23 February 1965, Maseru) is a Lesotho diplomat who has served as the Minister of Foreign Affairs of the Kingdom of Lesotho from 2017 to 2020.

== Foreign minister ==
In 2017 he negotiated the arrival of foreign peacekeepers in Lesotho.

In February 2019, Makgothi met with Russian Foreign Minister Sergey Lavrov and spoke on expanding relations between Lesotho and Russia.
