= India–Lesotho relations =

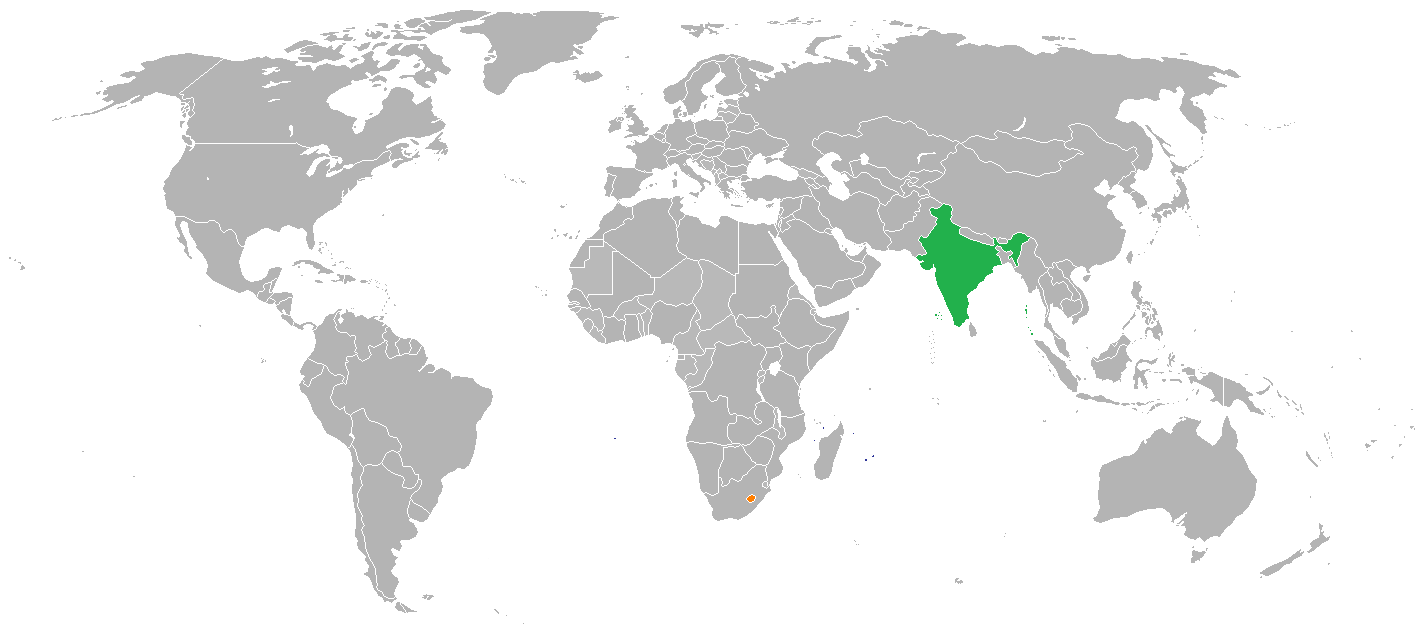
- India: Lesotho

India and Lesotho maintain diplomatic relations. Lesotho has a high commission in New Delhi and India has a non-resident High Commissioner in Pretoria, South Africa. Both nations are part of the Non-Aligned Movement and the Commonwealth of Nations.

"Considering that India is the largest democracy in the world, and given past contributions to the promotion of peace", Lesotho has officially decided to back India's candidacy for a permanent seat in a reformed Security Council. Lesotho has also recognised Kashmir as an integral part of India, and supports the Indian stand on this issue. According to the Indian High Commission to Pretoria's website, "Since 1996, the High Commission in Pretoria has been concurrently accredited to Lesotho. Earlier, Lesotho came under the charge of the High Commission in Botswana. Following the visit of Prime Minister Mosisili to India in August 2003, Lesotho opened a resident mission in New Delhi. Mr. Shabir Peerbhai was appointed as Lesotho’s High Commissioner to India." Shri Man Mohan Bakaya was appointed the Honorary Consul of India to the Kingdom of Lesotho in March 2014 at a ceremony held in the Lesotho capital, Maseru, by the Indian High Commissioner to South Africa (accredited to Lesotho).

== Community ==
An important, well established Indian community of 4,000 reside in Lesotho, conducting commerce and trade. With a high economic profile, the community's presence has been noted since the early 1900s. Annual festivals, functions, and events are carried out by the Indian Association Of Lesotho.

== Economic ties ==
During the fiscal year of 2022, India's net trade with Lesotho amounted to $30 million. This included pharmaceutical products, textiles and mineral products.

== See also ==
- Foreign relations of India
- Foreign relations of Lesotho
