= John Teboho Kolane =

Mosotho politician (1926–1999)

Speaker of the National Assembly of Lesotho
- In office 1990–1999
- Prime Minister: Justin Lekhanya; Elias Phisoana Ramaema; Ntsu Mokhehle; Hae Phoofolo; Pakalitha Mosisili
- Preceded by: Ntlhoi Motsamai
- In office 27 April 1973 – 20 January 1986
- Prime Minister: Leabua Jonathan
- Preceded by: Legislature dissolved

Personal details
- Born: 22 February 1926 Maseru
- Died: 14 August 1999 (aged 73) Accra
- Occupation: Politician

John Teboho Kolane (22 February 1926 - 14 August 1999) was a Lesotho politician and former Speaker of the National Assembly of Lesotho.

== Biography ==
Kolane was born in Maseru on 22 February 1926. He graduated as the first Mosotho from the Pius XII Catholic University College in 1948 with a bachelor's degree in English, political philosophy and native administration. In 1950, he started working in the civil service of Basutoland as an interpreter and later as a public prosecutor. He was a clerk to the National Assembly at the time of Lesotho's independence in 1966.

In 1970, Kolane was approved by chief Leabua Jonathan as the speaker of Interim National Assembly on 27 April 1973.

Kolane was the high commissioner in London from 1986 to 1989. He was then appointed as the speaker of the Constituent Assembly from 1990 to 1992. In 1993 Kolane was elected Speaker of the National Assembly, and served until his death.

He died of a heart attack on 14 August 1999 in Accra, Ghana. At that time, he was described as the longest-serving African legislative speaker.
