= Nthomeng Majara =

Deputy Prime Minister of Lesotho since 2022

The Honourable Nthomeng Majara MP
- in 2026

Deputy Prime Minister of Lesotho
- Incumbent
- Assumed office 28 October 2022
- Prime Minister: Sam Matekane
- Preceded by: Mathibeli Mokhothu

Minister of Justice, Law & Parliamentary Affairs
- Incumbent
- Assumed office 28 October 2022
- Prime Minister: Sam Matekane
- Preceded by: Mathibeli Mokhothu

Member of the National Assembly for Maseru
- Incumbent
- Assumed office 25 October 2022

Chief Justice of Lesotho
- In office September 2014 – 11 September 2018
- Monarch: Letsie III
- Preceded by: Tšeliso Monaphathi
- Succeeded by: Maseforo Mahase

Personal details
- Born: 8 June 1963 (age 63) Queen Elizabeth II Hospital, Lesotho
- Party: Revolution for Prosperity (2022–present)
- Education: National University of Lesotho; King's College London

Nthomeng Justina Majara (born 8 June 1963) is a Mosotho jurist and politician serving as Deputy Prime Minister of Lesotho since 2022. A member of Revolution for Prosperity, she previously served as Chief Justice of Lesotho from 2014 to 2018, being the first woman to be appointed to either office.

== Early life ==
Nthomeng Justina Majara was born on 8 June 1963 at Queen Elizabeth II Hospital in Lesotho, and her mother tongue is Sesotho. She earned a bachelor's degree in law from the National University of Lesotho, graduating in 1992, and a master's degree in law from King's College London, graduating in 1997.

== Career ==
Majara was appointed as the chief justice of Lesotho in September 2014, when she took over from Justice Tšeliso Monaphathi, who has been the acting chief justice since April 2013. When the High Court and Court of Appeal Registrar, Lesitsi Mokeke, was asked for more details, he replied, "This is news to me because I have just come out of a meeting with Justice Monaphathi ... I think he is also not aware of this development."

In 2017, Majara was one of 12 nominees for an election of six judges to the International Criminal Court to represent the African States regional group.

== Personal life ==
In October 2017, Majara was living in a "lavish Maseru mansion" sub-let from High Court judge Teboho Moiloa, despite government internal auditors having condemned the arrangement six months earlier.

== See also ==
- First women lawyers around the world
