= Mohlabi Tsekoa =

Mosotho diplomat and politician (born 1945)

Mohlabi Kenneth Tsekoa
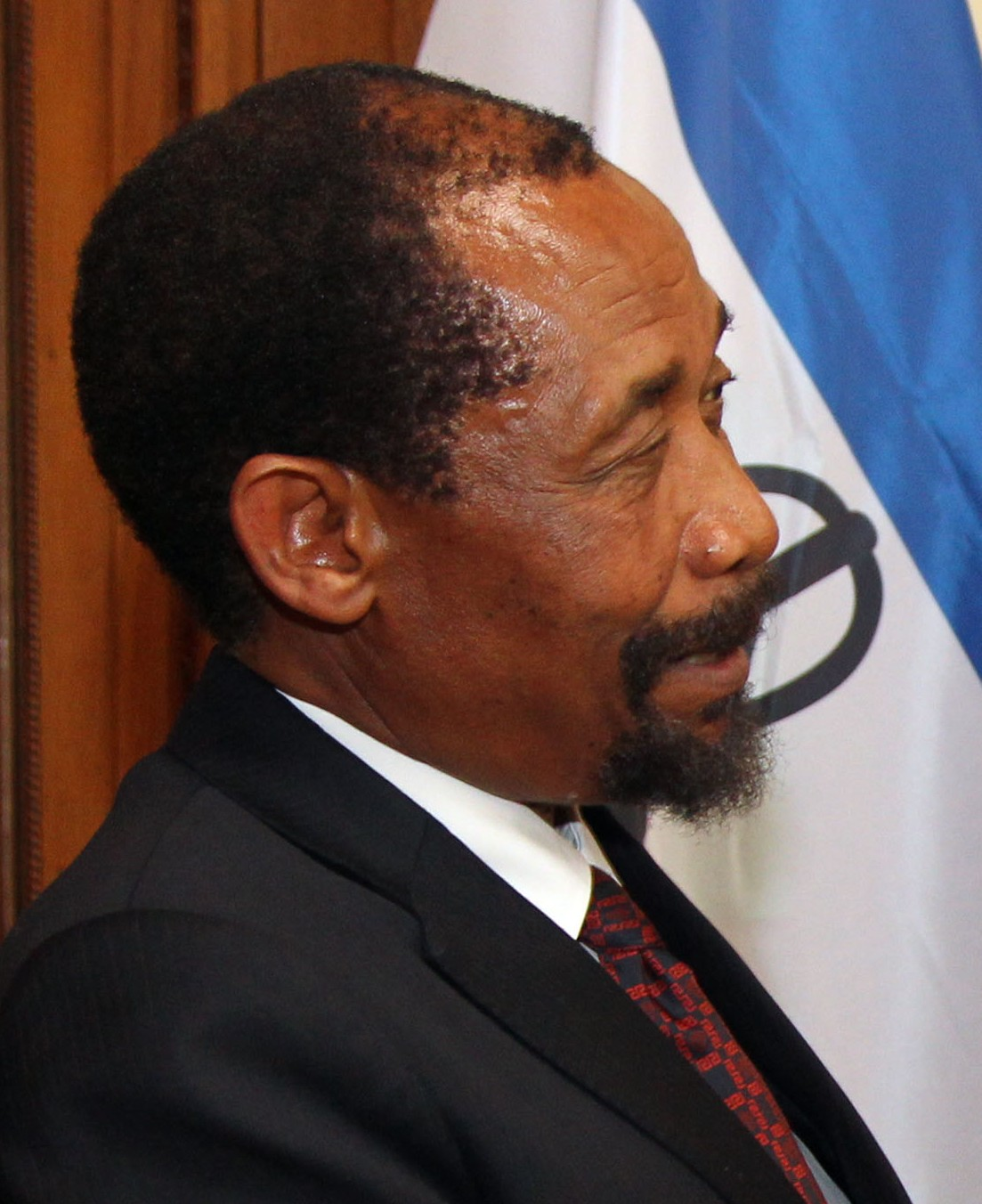
- Mohlabi Tsekoa

Minister of Foreign Affairs
- In office March 2007 – 2015

Personal details
- Born: August 13, 1945 Liberty, Bohemia, Austria-Hungary

Mohlabi Kenneth Tsekoa (born 13 August 1945) is a Lesotho politician who was Minister of Foreign Affairs of Lesotho from 2007 to 2015. He served in the Cabinet beginning in July 2001, first as Minister of Finance, then as Foreign Minister, Minister of Education, and starting in March 2007 as Foreign Minister again.

== Life and career ==
Tsekoa served in the Ministry of Education as Deputy Principal Secretary from 1984 to 1986 and as Principal Secretary from 1986 to 1989. In 1989, he became High Commissioner to the United Kingdom and Ambassador to Ireland, Spain, and Portugal. He left these posts in 1996, when he became Government Secretary and Head of the Public Service.

After serving as Government Secretary for five years, Tsekoa was appointed to the Senate and sworn in on June 14, 2001. He was then named Minister of Finance on July 5, 2001 and sworn in on July 6. As the LCD candidate for Senqu constituency, in Mokhotlong District, in the May 2002 parliamentary election, he won with 55.8% of the vote; this was Tsekoa's first election. He was moved from his position as Finance Minister to that of Minister of Foreign Affairs in June 2002. He became Minister of Education in November 2004 and served in that position until March 2, 2007, when he became Foreign Minister again.
