= Motlohi Maliehe =

Mosotho politician (born 1958)

Motlohi Paul Maliehe

Minister of Public Service of Lesotho
- In office 2021–2022
- Prime Minister: Moeketsi Majoro

Personal details
- Born: 28 September 1958 (age 67) Molumong, Mokhotlong District, Lesotho
- Party: ABC
- Occupation: Politician

Motlohi Maliehe (born 28 September 1958) is a former Minister of Public Service in Lesotho. Prior to this, he was the Minister of Forestry and Reclamation from May 2020 to February 2021.

== Background and education ==
Maliehe was born on 28 September 1958, in Molumong, Mokhotolong district. He has interests in reading novels. Motlohi Maliehe got his First School Leaving Certificate from Maluba-lube Primary School and his Secondary School Certificate at St. James High School. Thereafter, Maliehe took some certification courses in Time Management, Conflict Management and Mining Economics. Maliehe belongs to ABC political party in Lesotho.
