= Limpho Tau =

Mosotho politician

The Honourable Senator Limpho Tau

Minister in the Prime Minister's Office
- Incumbent
- Assumed office 4 November 2022
- Prime Minister: Sam Matekane
- Preceded by: Likopo Mahase

Member of the Senate of Lesotho
- Incumbent
- Assumed office 3 November 2022
- Appointed by: Letsie III

Member of the National Assembly of Lesotho
- In office 2017–2022
- Constituency: Proportional representation seats

Personal details
- Born: Limpho Justice Tau; 13 June 1970 (age 56) Teyateyaneng, Berea District, Lesotho
- Party: Revolution for Prosperity (2022–present)
- Other political affiliations: Democratic Party (2016–2022); Basotho National Party (Until 2016)
- Children: 4
- Education: National University of Lesotho (BSc); University of the Free State (MBA)
- Occupation: Politician

Limpho Justice Tau (born 13 June 1970) is a Mosotho politician who has been the Minister in the Prime Minister's Office in Sam Matekane's Cabinet since November 2022. A member of the Revolution for Prosperity party, Tau serves in the Senate. Tau had previously led the Democratic Party, and was the party's sole member in the National Assembly from 2017 until his defection to the RFP in March 2022.

== Background and education ==
Tau was born in 1970. He earned a Bachelor of Science from the National University of Lesotho and a master of Business Administration from the University of the Free State in South Africa.

Tau is the founder and current chairman of the Limpho Tau Foundation. He was the president of Lioli Football Club from 2007 through 2009. He is a member of the Catholic Christian Life Community (CLC) Sodality/

Tau is married and has four children.

== Political career ==
Tau stood unsuccessfully for the National Assembly in the 2015 general election as the Basotho National Party candidate in the Teya-Teyaneng No. 24 constituency. He was the BNP's constituency chair.

On 26 April 2016, Tau resigned from the BNP. He and other former BNP members formed the Democratic Party of Lesotho the following month. The party won one seat in the National Assembly at the 2017 general election through proportional representation and Tau was appointed to take up the seat.

Following the launch of businessman Sam Matekane's political party, the Revolution for Prosperity, in March 2022, Tau announced that he would be joining the party. Tau did not stand for re-election under the RFP ticket at the general election held in October 2022, which the RFP won. He was instead appointed to Senate by King Letsie III on 3 November 2023. Tau was sworn in as the Minister in the Prime Minister's Office the next day following his appointment by Matekane.
