= Lineo Ntoane =

Basotho diplomat (1966 – 2017)

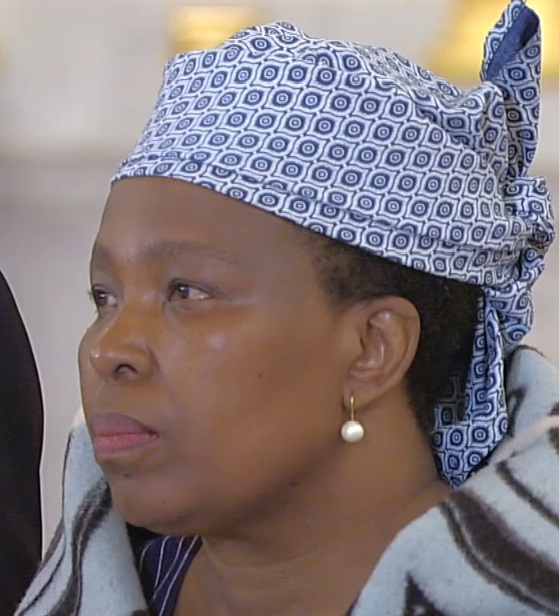
- Lineo Ntoane in 2014
- Born: May 12, 1966; Kingdom of Lesotho
- Died: December 22, 2017 (aged 51); Kingdom of Lesotho
- Occupation: former diplomat

Matlotliso Lineo Lydia Ntoane (also Matlotliso Lineo Khechane-Ntoane) (12 May 1966 – 22 December 2017 in the Kingdom of Lesotho) was a Basotho diplomat.

== Life ==
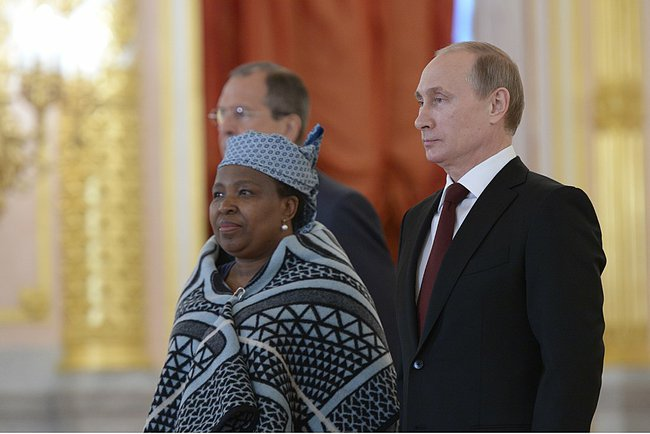
Lineo Ntoane with Vladimir Putin at the Kremlin during her accreditation, 27 June 2014

Ntoane joined the public service in the Kingdom of Lesotho in 1989 and worked in different ministries including Health, Local Government and Public Service. She holds a degree in sociology and in public administration. Ntoane was for six years the chair of the Lesotho Revenue Authority (LRA) Board. She also represented the Lesotho government in the Lesotho National Development Corporation (LNDC) and on the board of the Imperial Fleet Services company. In 2008 Ntoane became High Commissioner in Pretoria, South Africa and moved 2013 as ambassador to Berlin, Germany, succeeding Makase Nyaphisi. She was married to Rev. Kenny Ntoane from the Anglican Diocese of Lesotho and had a son and a daughter.

== Career ==
- 1989 - 1997: Official at the Ministry of Public Administration
- 1997 - 2000: Head inspector at the Ministry of Local Government and Chieftainship Affairs
- 2000 - 2008: Deputy secretary at the Ministry of Finance and Development Planning
  - 2004/2005: Chairperson Governing Board Lesotho Revenue Authority (Ministry of Finance and Development Planning)
  - 29 August 2005: Appointed Chief Executive - Support Services leading the Human Resources and general administration of The Ministry of Finance and Development Training.
  - 2007 The Lesotho Revenue Authority (LRA), LRA Board Chair
- 18 September 2008 - 2010: High Commissioner of Lesotho to South Africa (residence in Pretoria, South Africa)
  - 6 October 2008: High Commissioner of Lesotho (with residence in Pretoria) to Botswana
  - 24 October 2008: High Commissioner of Lesotho (with residence in Pretoria) to Namibia
  - 9 June 2009: High Commissioner of Lesotho (with residence in Pretoria) to Mauritius
  - 1 October 2009: High Commissioner of Lesotho (with residence in Pretoria) to Swaziland
  - 9 November 2009: High Commissioner of Lesotho (with residence in Pretoria) to Zambia
  - 27 October 2010: Ambassador of Lesotho (with residence in Pretoria) to Zimbabwe
  - 26 January 2011: High Commissioner of Lesotho (with residence in Pretoria) to Seychelles
- 18 July 2013: Ambassador Extraordinary and Plenipotentiary of Lesotho to Germany (residence Berlin, Germany)
  - 14 August 2013: Resident Representative to IAEA
  - 5 September 2013: Permanent Delegate to UNESCO
  - 2013: Permanent Representative to UNIDO
  - 12 December 2013: Ambassador Extraordinary and Plenipotentiary of Lesotho (with residence in Berlin) to the Holy See
  - 27 June 2014: Ambassador Extraordinary and Plenipotentiary of Lesotho (with residence in Berlin) to the Russian Federation
  - 8 July 2014: Ambassador Extraordinary and Plenipotentiary of Lesotho (with residence in Berlin) to France
  - 10 December 2014: Ambassador Extraordinary and Plenipotentiary of Lesotho (with residence in Berlin) to Austria
  - 14 January 2015: Ambassador Extraordinary and Plenipotentiary of Lesotho (with residence in Berlin) to Poland
  - 24 April 2015: Ambassador Extraordinary and Plenipotentiary of Lesotho (with residence in Berlin) to Monaco
- 6 December 2016: Recalled as ambassador and returned to Lesotho.
