= Sephiri Motanyane =

Mosotho politician (born 1939)

Sephiri Enoch Montanyane (born 1939) is a Lesotho politician. He served as the Speaker of the National Assembly of Lesotho from June 2017 to October 2022 in lower chamber of the Lesotho Parliament. Montanyane was formerly a Minister in the Prime Minister's office. He was first elected to the National Assembly from Malimabatso constituency in the 1965 elections. He was the minister of justice in 1990s.
