= Motlatsi Maqelepo =

Mosotho politician (born 1979)

Minister of Tourism, Sports, Arts and Culture of Lesotho

MP
- Incumbent
- Assumed office 8 November 2023
- Appointed by: Sam Matekane
- Constituency: Berea 27

Minister of Health of Lesotho
- In office 2020–2022
- Prime Minister: Moeketsi Majoro

Personal details
- Born: Motlatsi Maqelepo; 22 August 1979 (age 46) Sehlabeng Sa Thuathe, Berea District, Lesotho
- Party: Basotho Action Party
- Occupation: Politician

Motlatsi Maqelepo is a Mosotho politician and current Minister of Sports, Tourism, Arts and Culture of Lesotho. He's also a deputy leader of Basotho Action Party. He previously served as a Minister of Health from 2020 to 2022 in the government led by Moeketsi Majoro.

== Early life ==
Motlatsi Maqelepo was born on the 22 August 1979 at Sehlabeng Sa Thuathe in Berea District. He attended at Morija High School in Morija.
