= Ntoi Rapapa =

Lesotho politician

The Honourable Ntoi Rapapa MP

Minister of Education and Training of Lesotho
- Incumbent
- Assumed office 28 October 2022
- Prime Minister: Sam Matekane

Chief Executive Officer of Lesotho Electricity And Water Authority
- In office 2010–2016

Member of the National Assembly for Mosalemane
- Incumbent
- Assumed office 25 October 2022

Personal details
- Born: 28 February 1968 (age 58) Mapoteng, Berea, Lesotho
- Party: Alliance of Democrats
- Education: National University of Lesotho; University of Manchester

Ntoi Rapapa (born 28 February 1968) is a Lesotho politician, former physics professor and former CEO of LEWA. He has been the Minister of Education and Training of Lesotho since 28 October 2022.

== Education and early career ==
Rapapa was born on 28 February 1968 and was raised in Maphatšoaneng, Mapoteng in Berea District. His father died when he was 5 years old, and he was raised by his mother, who was a trader selling clothing, beer and produce. He attended Dahon High School.

His BSc in physics and mathematics is from the National University of Lesotho (1993). He then gained an Advanced Post Graduate Diploma in physics from Italy's International Centre of Theoretical Physics (1995). He was an assistant lecturer at the National University of Lesotho in 1995–96 before studying in the UK, where he gained a PhD in physics from the University of Manchester (1999). He then returned to the National University of Lesotho, serving successively as lecturer (1999–2004), senior lecturer (2004–09) and associate professor (2009–10).

He was the Chief Executive Officer of Lesotho's Electricity and Water Authority (2010–16).

== Political career ==
In September 2016, he contested the Mosalemane No. 19 constituency. He lost the seat to his older brother, Sam Rapapa, in the elections of 3 June 2017. He was elected to the Senate in June 2017, and was appointed the Deputy Minister of Education and Training in July 2017. He has been the Minister of Education and Training since April 2018. He served in the coalition government led by Tom Thabane.in 2022 he won elections and became a member of Parliament and then Minister of education and training

== Personal life ==
He is married to 'Mapalesa; they have two children.
