= Lejone Mpotjoane =

Mosotho politician

Minister of Foreign Affairs and International Relations

MP
- Incumbent
- Assumed office 28 October 2022
- Preceded by: 'Matšepo Ramakoae

Personal details
- Born: 19 February 1983 (age 43) Butha-Buthe, Lesotho
- Party: Revolution for Prosperity
- Education: National University of Lesotho
- Occupation: Politician
- Cabinet: Cabinet of Sam Matekane

Lejone Mpotjoane is a Mosotho politician who currently serves as the minister of foreign affairs and international relations.
