= Neo Moteane =

Mosotho politician

Neo Matjato Moteane is a Mosotho businessman, finance analyst and politician serving in the cabinet of Sam Matekane as minister of Public Works and Transport of Lesotho. He is a member of Revolution for Prosperity (RFP) party. He served as acting minister of Foreign Affairs and International Relations of Lesotho in 2025.

== Career ==
Before entering politics, he held several positions in the business sector including at Goldhill Group and was the chairperson of the Council on Higher Education (CHE) Lesotho. As minister of Public Works and Transport led negotiation for the Cross-Border Road Transport Agreement with South Africa to ease challenges faced by Basotho public transport and trucking industries. Moteane was the chairperson of the African Union Specialised Technical Committee on Transport, Transcontinental and Interregional Infrastructure and Energy (STC-TTIIE).
