= Pitso Lesaoana =

Pitso Lesaoana is a Mosotho politician and a member of the Revolution for Prosperity (RFP) party serving in the cabinet of Sam Matekane as minister of Gender, Youth and Social Development of Lesotho since 2022. He is a member of Lesotho parliament from Maama 45 Constituency elected on the ticket of RFP in the 2022 Lesotho general elections.

As minister of Social Development, Lesaoana directs activities in arts, sports and culture and introduced several initiatives including Sebabatso – a youth empowerment program to reduce unemployment. He previously served as acting minister of Foreign Affairs and International Relations.
