= Foreign relations of Lesotho =

Lesotho's geographic location makes it extremely vulnerable to political and economic developments in South Africa. Its capital is the small city of Maseru. It is a member of many regional economic organizations including the Southern African Development Community (SADC) and the Southern African Customs Union (SACU). Lesotho also is active in the United Nations, the Organisation of African Unity, now the African Union, the Non-Aligned Movement, and many other international organizations. In addition to the Republic of Korea, the United States, South Africa, Ireland, People's Republic of China, Libya, and the European Union all currently retain resident diplomatic missions in Lesotho. Foreign relations of Lesotho are administered by the Ministry of Foreign Affairs and International Relations.

Lesotho has historically maintained generally close ties with Ireland (Lesotho's largest bilateral aid donor), the United States, the United Kingdom, Germany, and other Western states. Although Lesotho decided in 1990 to break relations with the People's Republic of China (P.R.C.) and re-establish relations with the Republic of China (commonly known by its main island as Taiwan), it had restored ties with the P.R.C. in 1994.

== Diplomatic relations ==
List of countries which Lesotho maintains diplomatic relations with:

#	Country	Date
1	United Kingdom	4 October 1966
2	United States	4 October 1966
3	Israel	4 October 1966
4	Ghana	24 November 1966
5	South Korea	7 December 1966
—	Holy See	11 March 1967
6	Canada	27 April 1967
7	Italy	June 1967
8	France	21 August 1967
9	Switzerland	22 August 1967
10	Belgium	24 August 1967
11	Austria	1967
12	Germany	15 February 1968
13	Netherlands	22 February 1968
14	Sweden	29 May 1968
15	Kenya	20 June 1968
16	Uganda	4 October 1968
17	Liberia	20 October 1968
18	Sierra Leone	22 October 1968
19	Ivory Coast	28 October 1968
20	Cameroon	29 October 1968
21	Tanzania	23 January 1971
22	India	8 June 1971
23	Japan	29 July 1971
24	Nigeria	November 1971
25	Iran	15 December 1971
26	Madagascar	7 December 1971
27	Serbia	25 September 1972
28	Botswana	April 1973
29	Kuwait	30 April 1973
30	Egypt	31 May 1973
31	Australia	9 July 1973
32	Zambia	19 September 1973
33	Romania	1 May 1975
34	United Arab Emirates	8 July 1975
35	Mozambique	9 September 1975
36	Mexico	14 November 1975
37	Brazil	31 December 1975
38	Denmark	21 January 1976
39	Eswatini	12 February 1976
40	Portugal	29 March 1976
41	Spain	3 May 1976
42	Norway	8 May 1976
43	Bahrain	24 July 1976
44	Malawi	4 September 1976
45	Greece	31 January 1977
46	Poland	20 December 1978
47	New Zealand	1978
48	Finland	1 February 1979
49	Cuba	14 June 1979
50	Guyana	25 August 1979
51	Jamaica	19 October 1979
52	Guinea	1 November 1979
53	Barbados	25 November 1979
54	Russia	1 February 1980
55	Albania	June 1980
56	Bulgaria	10 July 1980
57	North Korea	19 July 1980
58	Ethiopia	22 July 1980
59	Democratic Republic of the Congo	6 November 1980
60	Turkey	1980
61	Luxembourg	15 May 1982
62	Zimbabwe	1 July 1982
63	Czech Republic	7 November 1982
64	Iraq	1982
65	Bangladesh	4 March 1983
66	Hungary	29 March 1983
67	China	30 April 1983
68	Nicaragua	14 June 1983
69	Venezuela	26 June 1983
70	Iceland	24 August 1983
71	Algeria	1983
72	Angola	1983
73	Rwanda	1983
74	Pakistan	4 July 1984
75	Mongolia	2 July 1985
76	Bahamas	1987
77	Malaysia	31 March 1988
78	Thailand	17 April 1989
79	Peru	21 July 1989
80	Singapore	12 January 1990
—	Sahrawi Arab Democratic Republic	5 April 1990
81	Namibia	11 April 1990
82	Morocco	1990
83	South Africa	21 May 1992
84	Indonesia	4 November 1993
85	Slovakia	8 May 1995
86	Vietnam	6 January 1998
87	Philippines	15 April 1998
88	Colombia	17 April 1998
89	Costa Rica	17 April 1998
90	Uruguay	26 May 1998
91	Chile	25 August 1998
92	North Macedonia	3 September 1998
93	Croatia	6 November 1998
94	Argentina	19 May 1999
95	Brunei	30 March 2000
96	Ukraine	1 June 2000
97	Sri Lanka	14 July 2000
98	Lithuania	20 July 2000
99	Tunisia	1 December 2000
100	Qatar	10 April 2001
101	Mauritius	20 December 2001
102	Lebanon	28 May 2002
103	Libya	20 March 2003
104	Cyprus	25 February 2004
105	Ireland	14 June 2005
106	Malta	11 April 2006
107	Sudan	15 November 2007
108	Monaco	15 July 2008
109	Nepal	18 May 2010
110	San Marino	30 November 2010
111	Seychelles	25 January 2011
112	Estonia	26 September 2012
113	Azerbaijan	28 September 2012
114	Trinidad and Tobago	2 November 2012
115	Georgia	23 September 2013
116	Montenegro	23 September 2013
117	Latvia	10 February 2014
118	Kazakhstan	2 April 2015
119	Eritrea	21 June 2015
120	Burkina Faso	14 April 2016
121	Mauritania	9 March 2017
122	Kyrgyzstan	20 July 2017
123	Niger	17 August 2017
124	Belarus	2020
125	Maldives	29 March 2021
126	Saudi Arabia	20 August 2021
—	State of Palestine	30 September 2021
—	Sovereign Military Order of Malta	7 December 2021
127	Dominican Republic	2 November 2023
128	Bhutan	29 October 2024
129	Bolivia	8 November 2024
130	Jordan	7 May 2025
131	Armenia	12 November 2025
132	Moldova	27 March 2026
133	Uzbekistan	27 March 2026
134	Liechtenstein	1 July 2026
135	Tajikistan	22 September 2026
136	Oman	14 October 2026

== Bilateral relations ==
Country	Formal Relations Began	Notes
Canada	1967	See Canada–Lesotho relations: Canada is represented in Lesotho via parallel accreditation of its high commission in Pretoria, South Africa and has an honorary consulate in Maseru.; Since 2006, Lesotho has a high commission in Ottawa; Both countries are full members of Commonwealth of Nations.; Pakalitha Mosisili was educated in through Canadian Government provided scholarships
Cyprus	25 February 2004	Both countries established diplomatic relations on 25 February 2004.; Cyprus is represented in Lesotho through its High Commission in Pretoria, South Africa.; Lesotho is represented in Cyprus via parallel accreditation of its High Commission in London.; Both countries are full members of the Commonwealth of Nations.
France		See France–Lesotho relations: France is accredited to Lesotho from its embassy in Pretoria, South Africa.; Lesotho is accredited to France from its embassy in Berlin, Germany.
Germany	1966	Germany is represented in Lesotho through its embassy in Pretoria, South Africa.; Lesotho has an embassy in Berlin.
Greece	31 January 1977	Both countries established diplomatic relations on 31 January 1977: Greece is represented in Lesotho through its embassy in Pretoria, South Africa.; Lesotho is represented in Greece via parallel accreditation of its embassy in Rome, Italy.
India	8 June 1971	See India–Lesotho relations: The High Commission in Pretoria has been concurrently accredited to Lesotho.; Lesotho has a High Commission in New Delhi.
Ireland	14 June 2005	Lesotho has significant relations with Ireland. On 13 November 1997, Liz O'Donnell (Irish Minister for State) spoke about the relationship between the two nations and Ireland's future commitment towards Lesotho. The Irish Prime Minister, Bertie Ahern visited Lesotho in 2000. This relationship was further strengthened by a visit from the then President of Ireland Mary McAleese between 14 and 16 June 2006 on her speech about the long-standing relationship with Lesotho and shared history between both nations. The Irish Government has donated aid to Lesotho since 1975. Donations to Lesotho is Ireland's longest running aid programme. On 14 February 2005, Lesotho announced that Ireland is the largest bilateral donor with financial support in excess of M70 million in each of the past three years. Ireland also supports Lesotho's Flying Doctor Service, education, sanitation, water and various health such as the Fight against AIDS with the Clinton Foundation.
Mexico	14 November 1975	Lesotho is accredited to Mexico from its embassy in Washington, D.C., United States.; Mexico is accredited to Lesotho from its embassy in Pretoria, South Africa.
South Korea	7 December 1966	Establishment of Diplomatic Relations between the Republic of Korea and Lesotho is 7 December 1966 and in 2011 Bilateral Trade were Exports $27,330,000, Imports: $290,000.
Turkey	1980	Embassy of Lesotho in Rome is accredited to Turkey.; Turkish ambassador in Pretoria to South Africa is also accredited to Lesotho.; Trade volume between the two countries was US$1.65 million in 2019 (Lesotho's exports/imports: 0.03/1.62 million USD).
United Kingdom	4 October 1966	See Lesotho–United Kingdom relations British Foreign Office Minister Hugo Swire with Masotho Prime Minister Tom Thabane in London, April 2014. Lesotho established diplomatic relations with the United Kingdom on 4 October 1966.: Lesotho maintains a high commission in London.; The United Kingdom is accredited to Lesotho through its high commission in Maseru.; The UK governed Lesotho from 1868 to 1966, when it achieved full independence. Both countries share common membership of the Commonwealth and the World Trade Organization, as well as the SACUM–UK Economic Partnership Agreement. Bilaterally the two countries have an Investment Agreement.
United States	4 October 1966 15 April 2025	See Lesotho-United States relations The United States was one of the first four countries to establish an embassy in Maseru after Lesotho gained its independence from Great Britain in 1966. Since this time, Lesotho and the United States have consistently maintained warm bilateral relations. In 1996, the United States closed its bilateral aid program in Lesotho. The Southern African regional office of the U.S. Agency for International Development (USAID) in Gaborone, Botswana now administers most of the U.S. assistance to Lesotho, which totalled approximately $2 million in FY 2004. Total U.S. aid to Lesotho is over $69 million, including humanitarian food assistance. The Peace Corps has operated in Lesotho since 1969.About 69 Peace Corps volunteers concentrate in the sectors of health, agriculture, education, rural community development, and the environment. The Government of Lesotho encourages greater American participation in commercial life and welcomes interest from potential U.S. investors and suppliers. In 2007, the Government of Lesotho signed a compact with the Millennium Challenge Corporation to provide $362.5 million in support to develop Lesotho's water sector, healthcare infrastructure, and private sector. The Lesotho Communications Authority granted Starlink, a company owned by Elon Musk a license to operate for 10 years in Lesotho.

== See also ==
- List of diplomatic missions in Lesotho
