= Retselisitsoe Matlanyane =

Adelaide Retselisitsoe Matlanyane is a Mosotho economic expert specilised in Macro-econometric and Economy Wide Modeling. Currently serving as minister of finance and development planning of Lesotho since 2022, she was the first woman governor of Central Bank of Lesotho (CBL) serving from 2012 to 2021. Matlanyane was named in the Avance Media inaugural List of 100 Most Influential African Women in 2019.

== Education ==
She holds a bachelor’s degree in economics from National University of Lesotho and a master’s degree in same course from University of Botswana. She studied for her PhD in macro-econometric and economy wide modeling at the University of Pretoria, South Africa.

== Career ==
Matlanyane began her career at the National University of Lesotho where she taught economics. She joined the Central Bank of Lesotho in April 2006 as a second deputy governor for research, financial markets and operations and was promoted to the position of first deputy governor in April 2007. She was later appointed acting governor of the bank serving until 2012 when she was appointed substantive governor of CBL becoming the first woman to hold the position. She left the bank on 31 December 2021. In 2022, she was appointed minister of finance and development planning.
