= Mokhethi Shelile =

Lesotho politician

Mokhethi Shelile is a Lesotho politician serving as minister of trade, industry and business development since 30 October 2022. He is a member of Revolution for Prosperity (RFP) and member of parliament from Lithabaneng Constituency 40.

== Career ==
Shelile graduated with a bachelor’s degree in economics from National University of Lesotho in 1995. He served as investment promotion officer at Lesotho National Development Corporation (LNDC) and later became the head of LNDC leading international investment promotion missions to SACU region, Germany, the UK, Egypt and Kenya. He was noted for his leadership at LNDC and won the UNCTAD Investment Promotion Agency of the year 2016.

He is a member of RFP party and sits on its Executive Committee as the public relations officer of the party. He is a member of parliament of Lesotho from Lithabaneng Constituency 40. He was appointed minister of trade, industry and business development on 30 October 2022.
