= Thabo Mofosi =

Thabo Mofosi is a Mosotho politician and a member of Revolution for Prosperity (RFP) party. He is the minister of Agriculture, Food Security and Nutrition of Lesotho since November 4, 2022.

== Political career ==
During his term as minister, he introduced several policies in the agricultural sector including Smallholders Agricultural Development Project (SADPII) for effective distribution of seedlings to young farmers across the 10 districts of Lesotho. Mofosi promoted agricultural technologies and climate-smart initiatives to cushion the impact of drought on national food production and advocated for private sector investment in aquaculture and fishery sector for maximum utilization of Lesotho water resources.
