= Richard Ramoeletsi =

Richard Ramoeletsi is a Mosotho politician serving in the cabinet of Sam Matekane as minister of Law and Justice of Lesotho since 2023. He was first appointed into the cabinet in 2022 as minister of Public Service, Labour and Employment.

== Career ==
Ramoeletsi served as Lesotho’s ambassador to Japan in the 2010s. He was appointed to cabinet of Sam Matekane in November 2022 as minister of Public Service, Labour and Employment before being redeployed to the Ministry of Law and Justice in a cabinet reshuffle in November 2023.

At the Ministry of Law and Justice, Ramoeletsi coordinated digitization of Lesotho law with the launch of digital Index of Lesotho Laws from 1800 to 2024 and the Grey Book digitization project for public easy access to legal information. In 2025, he led a Lesotho delegation to Kenya to study the country’s constitution-making process to support Lesotho national reform.

== Land ownership dispute ==
In January 2026, Ramoeletsi was reportedly involved in plot of land ownership dispute in Ha Thetsane. His claim of ownership of the piece of land was dismissed by a magistrate court due to lack of original purchase documents.
