= Nthati Moorosi =

Mosotho politician and cabinet minister

Minister of Information, Communications, Science, Technology and Innovation of Lesotho

MP
- Incumbent
- Assumed office 2022
- Prime Minister: Sam Matekane

Personal details
- Born: 18 May 1976 (age 50) Mazenod, Maseru District, Lesotho
- Party: Revolution for Prosperity
- Education: National University of Lesotho
- Occupation: Politician

Nthati Moorosi is a Mosotho communications expert and politician serving as Minister of Information, Communications, Science, Technology and Innovation (MICSTI) of Lesotho since 4 November 2022. Moorosi is a member of the Parliament of Lesotho elected from the Thetsane 34 Constituency in Maseru on the Revolution for Prosperity (RFP) party ticket.

== Career ==
Moorosi holds advanced degrees in Cultural and Media Studies and Gender Studies. She has over 15 years of experience in the communications sector.

She worked with several international bodies including the UNDP, the National University of Lesotho, World Vision, and the Millennium Challenge Account in senior communications positions. She is the founder of the private communications company BANLIN Communications. Moorosi is a founding member of the RFP party and serves as the secretary-general of the party. She is a member of parliament representing the Thetsane 34 Constituency in Maseru. She was appointed Minister of Information, Communications, Science, Technology and Innovation (MICSTI) of Lesotho on 4 November 2022.
