= Mohlomi Moleko =

Mohlomi Moleko is a Mosotho politician serving as the minister of Natural Resources in the cabinet of Sam Matekane of Lesotho since 2022. A member of the Revolution for Prosperity (RFP) party, he served as acting minister of Energy in 2024 coordinating Lesotho Electricity Company (LEC) and regional electrification projects.

As minister of Natural Resources, he introduced a number of policies including water management with the introduction of digital hydronation, modern irrigation system, hydrogen fuel manufacturing and water sanitation such Lesotho Lowlands Water Development Project (LLWDP). He advocates for formalization of small-scale mining to boost local participation in mining especially in diamond.
