= List of diplomatic missions in Lesotho =

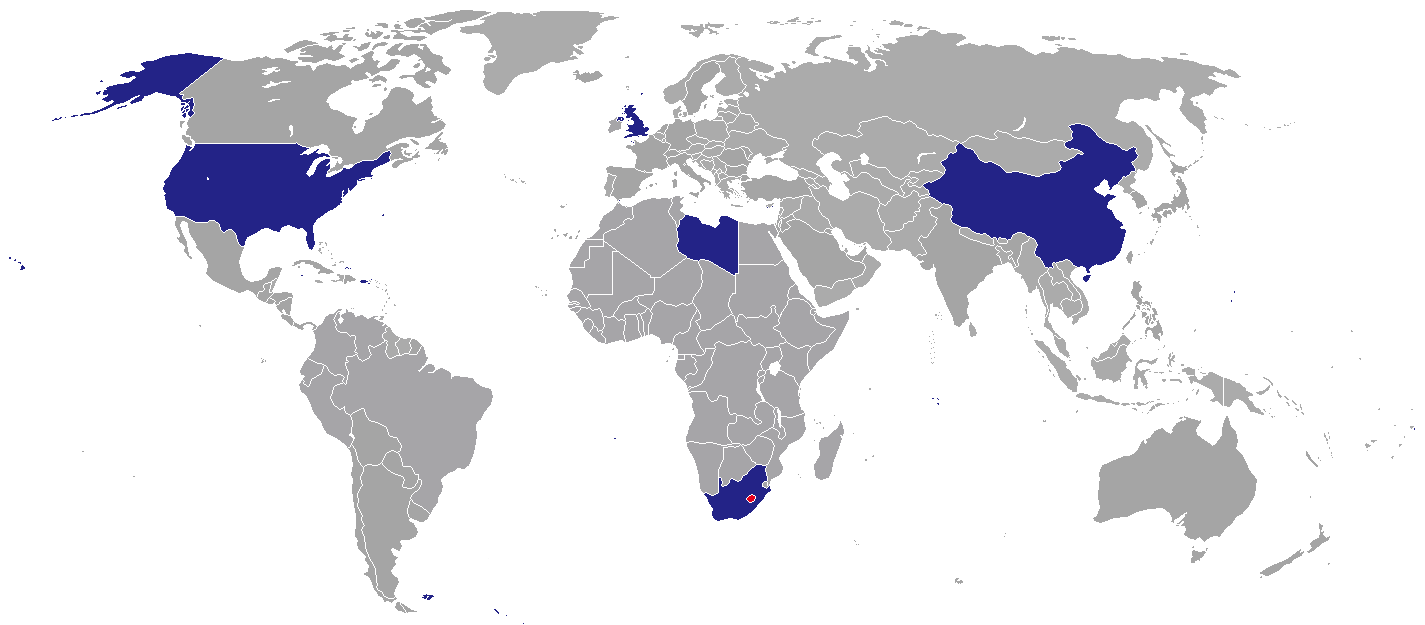
Diplomatic missions in Lesotho

This is a list of diplomatic missions in Lesotho. At present, the capital city of Maseru hosts five embassies.

== Embassies and High Commissions in Maseru ==
1. China
2. Libya
3. South Africa
4. United States
5. United Kingdom

== Missions to open ==
=== Maseru ===
- Turkey

== Other missions or delegations in Maseru ==
- European Union (Delegation)

== Non-resident embassies/high commissions ==
Resident in Pretoria unless otherwise noted

- Algeria
- Angola
- Argentina
- Australia
- Austria
- Bangladesh
- Bahrain
- Belgium
- Botswana
- Brazil
- Burkina Faso
- Cameroon
- Canada
- Croatia
- Cuba
- Cyprus
- Czechia
- Denmark
- Egypt
- Finland
- France
- Germany
- Ghana
- Greece
- Guinea
- Guatemala
- Holy See
- Haiti
- Hungary
- India
- Indonesia
- Iran
- Ireland
- Italy
- Israel
- Japan
- Jamaica
- Laos (New Delhi)
- Lebanon
- Maldives (New Delhi)
- Mali
- Malta (Valletta)
- Malaysia
- Mauritius
- Mexico
- Mozambique
- Namibia
- Netherlands
- New Zealand
- Norway
- Poland
- Portugal
- Palestine
- Rwanda
- Romania
- Russia
- Sahrawi Republic
- Saudi Arabia
- Seychelles
- Sierra Leone (Nairobi)
- Serbia
- Singapore
- Slovakia
- Somalia
- Spain
- Sweden
- Switzerland
- Sudan
- South Sudan
- South Korea
- Thailand
- Tanzania
- United Arab Emirates
- United Kingdom
- Uruguay
- Vietnam
- Yemen
- Zimbabwe
- Zambia

== Closed missions ==
Host city	Sending country	Mission	Year closed	Ref.
Maseru	Germany	Embassy	1994	
Maseru	Ireland	Embassy	2014	
Maseru	Russia	Embassy	1992	
Maseru	Sweden	Embassy	1993	
