= Human rights in Lesotho =

Human rights in Lesotho, a nation of 2,067,000 people completely surrounded by South Africa, is a contentious issue. In its 2012 Freedom in the World report, Freedom House declared the country "Partly Free". According to the United States Bureau of Democracy, Human Rights and Labor, which produces annual human rights reports on the country, the most pressing human rights issues are the use of torture, poor prison conditions, and the abuse of women and children.

== History and political situation ==
Lesotho became independent from the United Kingdom in 1966. The period until 1998 saw a series of annulled elections and military coups.

The following chart shows Lesotho's ratings since 1972 in the Freedom in the World reports, published annually by Freedom House. A rating of 1 is "free"; 7, "not free".^{1}

Historical ratings
| Year | Political Rights | Civil Liberties | Status | Head of Government^{2} |
|---|---|---|---|---|
| 1972 | 7 | 4 | Not Free | Leabua Jonathan |
| 1973 | 5 | 3 | Partly Free | Leabua Jonathan |
| 1974 | 5 | 4 | Partly Free | Leabua Jonathan |
| 1975 | 5 | 4 | Partly Free | Leabua Jonathan |
| 1976 | 5 | 4 | Partly Free | Leabua Jonathan |
| 1977 | 5 | 4 | Partly Free | Leabua Jonathan |
| 1978 | 5 | 5 | Partly Free | Leabua Jonathan |
| 1979 | 5 | 5 | Partly Free | Leabua Jonathan |
| 1980 | 5 | 5 | Partly Free | Leabua Jonathan |
| 1981 | 5 | 5 | Partly Free | Leabua Jonathan |
| 1982^{3} | 5 | 5 | Partly Free | Leabua Jonathan |
| 1983 | 5 | 5 | Partly Free | Leabua Jonathan |
| 1984 | 5 | 5 | Partly Free | Leabua Jonathan |
| 1985 | 5 | 5 | Partly Free | Leabua Jonathan |
| 1986 | 5 | 5 | Partly Free | Leabua Jonathan |
| 1987 | 5 | 6 | Partly Free | Justin Lekhanya |
| 1988 | 6 | 6 | Not Free | Justin Lekhanya |
| 1989 | 6 | 5 | Not Free | Justin Lekhanya |
| 1990 | 6 | 5 | Not Free | Justin Lekhanya |
| 1991 | 6 | 4 | Partly Free | Justin Lekhanya |
| 1992 | 6 | 4 | Partly Free | Elias Phisoana Ramaema |
| 1993 | 3 | 4 | Partly Free | Elias Phisoana Ramaema |
| 1994 | 4 | 4 | Partly Free | Ntsu Mokhehle |
| 1995 | 4 | 4 | Partly Free | Ntsu Mokhehle |
| 1996 | 4 | 4 | Partly Free | Ntsu Mokhehle |
| 1997 | 4 | 4 | Partly Free | Ntsu Mokhehle |
| 1998 | 4 | 4 | Partly Free | Ntsu Mokhehle |
| 1999 | 4 | 4 | Partly Free | Pakalitha Mosisili |
| 2000 | 4 | 4 | Partly Free | Pakalitha Mosisili |
| 2001 | 4 | 4 | Partly Free | Pakalitha Mosisili |
| 2002 | 2 | 3 | Free | Pakalitha Mosisili |
| 2003 | 2 | 3 | Free | Pakalitha Mosisili |
| 2004 | 2 | 3 | Free | Pakalitha Mosisili |
| 2005 | 2 | 3 | Free | Pakalitha Mosisili |
| 2006 | 2 | 3 | Free | Pakalitha Mosisili |
| 2007 | 2 | 3 | Free | Pakalitha Mosisili |
| 2008 | 2 | 3 | Free | Pakalitha Mosisili |
| 2009 | 3 | 3 | Partly Free | Pakalitha Mosisili |
| 2010 | 3 | 3 | Partly Free | Pakalitha Mosisili |
| 2011 | 3 | 3 | Partly Free | Pakalitha Mosisili |
| 2012 | 2 | 3 | Free | Pakalitha Mosisili |
| 2013 | 2 | 3 | Free | Tom Thabane |
| 2014 | 2 | 3 | Free | Tom Thabane |
| 2015 | 3 | 3 | Partly Free | Tom Thabane |
| 2016 | 3 | 3 | Partly Free | Pakalitha Mosisili |
| 2017 | 3 | 3 | Partly Free | Pakalitha Mosisili |
| 2018 | 3 | 3 | Partly Free | Tom Thabane |
| 2019 | 3 | 3 | Partly Free | Tom Thabane |
| 2020 | 3 | 3 | Partly Free | Tom Thabane |
| 2021 | 3 | 3 | Partly Free | Moeketsi Majoro |
| 2022 | 2 | 3 | Free | Moeketsi Majoro |
| 2023 | 2 | 3 | Free | Sam Matekane |

The early 1970s saw the detainment of political refugee members of the Pan Africanist Congress of Azania — a splinter group of the African National Congress — from South Africa. Ntsu Mokhehle, the leader of the Basutoland Congress Party (BCP), was also detained as a political prisoner. A visit by Joan Lestor, Baroness Lestor of Eccles on behalf of Amnesty International (AI) revealed that 90 - 100 members of the BCP were being detained. Most had been released by January 1972. On 6 January 1974, however 20 more members were arrested. After attacks by armed gangs on police sub-stations the next day, further arrests were made, bringing the total to more than 170. On top of this, the BCP claimed over 80 people were killed by the government in retaliation. Many of those arrested were charged with treason. As of 1978 nine members of the BCP were still being held in the Maseru Central Prison.

After clashes and bomb explosions in May 1979, the situation once again became tense between the BCP and the ruling Basotho National Party. After cabinet minister Chief Lepatoa Mou was assassinated by insurgents, the Police Mobile Unit (PMU) began retaliatory attacks, assaulting and killing civilians in Butha-Buthe District. By the end of 1979 more than 600 people had fled to South Africa. These political refugees claimed at least fifty suspected supporters of the insurgents had been killed by the government. 1980 saw many political arrests, including of at least four professors of the National University of Lesotho.

Another series of explosions occurred 1981, including one at the National Airport. These were attributed to the BCP's banned militaristic wing, the Lesotho Liberation Army (LLA). In retaliation the PMU reportedly broke into the home of Benjamin Masilo, chair of the Christian Council of Lesotho. He narrowly escaped death and fled abroad, but his grandson was killed. The PMU then abducted and killed Edgar Motuba, an outspoken critic of the government and editor of the weekly Leselinyana la Lesotho newspaper. He was found lying with the corpses of two friends. A visit by AI late that year revealed that other citizens had been killed. 1982 saw reports of torture against political detainees and the emergence of a new political death squad, known as the Koeeoko. In December the South African Defence Force entered Maseru at night and killed many officials of the African National Congress, as well as twelve citizens of Lesotho. At least forty extrajudicial killings were reported to have been carried out, and most were against unarmed persons. The government, concerned of potential further attacks by the South Africans, began air lifting refugees to Mozambique. Reports of torture and arbitrary arrest continued to leak to the outside world through the next two years.

After the 1998 parliamentary elections gave the Lesotho Congress for Democracy 79 out of 80 seats with just 60.5% percent of the vote, violent protests ensued and the Southern African Development Community intervened militarily. The Interim Political Authority was set up and introduced a system of mixed proportional representation which was first put into effect in the 2002 election.

Political unrest continues. May 2011 saw mass protests and strikes over the poor economic situation.

== Current issues (2008–) ==
=== Minority and women's rights ===
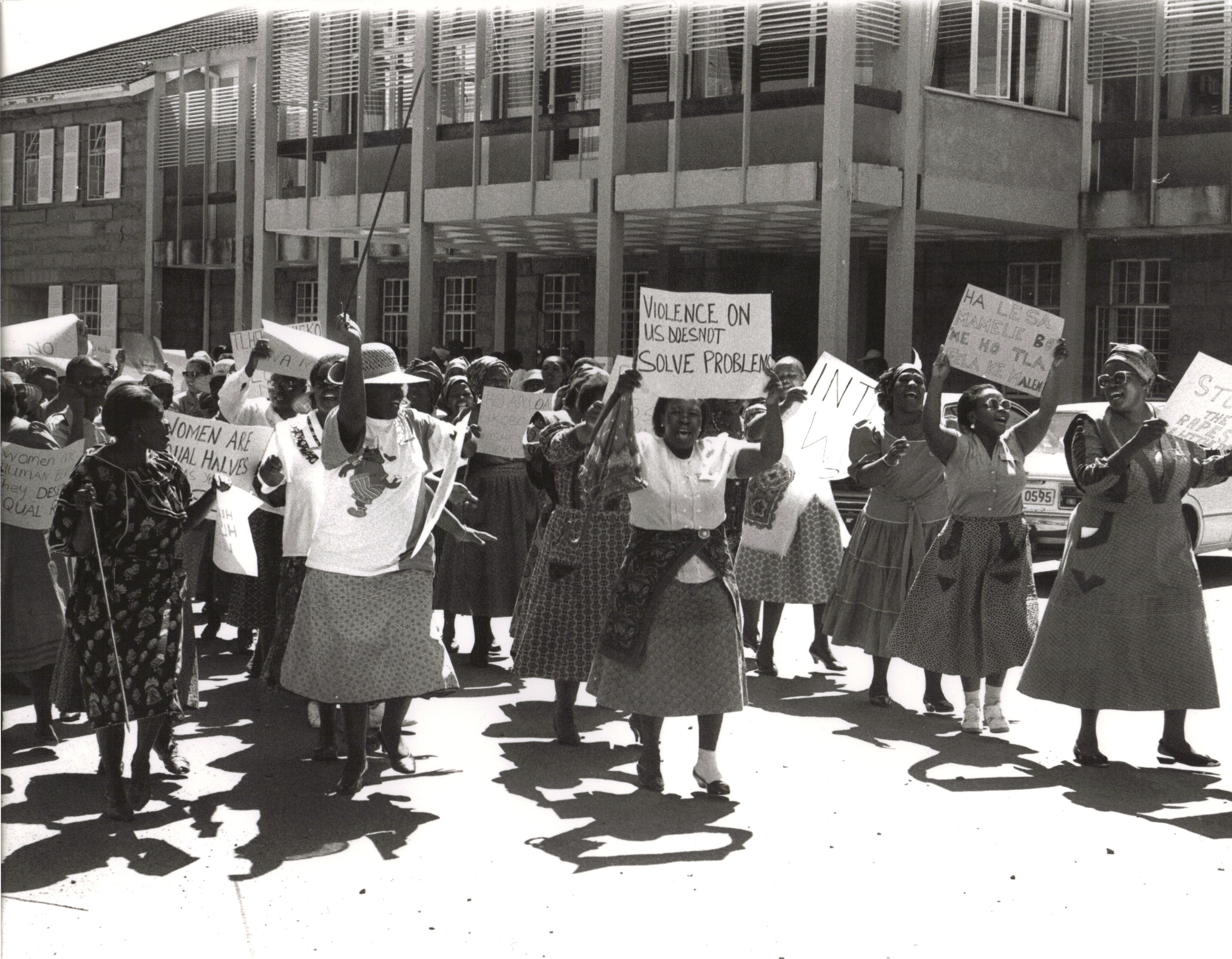
Lesotho women protesting violence against women on National Women's Day at the National University of Lesotho.

The rights of those with HIV/AIDS is protected by the law. The Lesotho Network of People Living with HIV/AIDS claims that discrimination exists but is on the decline.

Of the National Assembly's 120 seats, 29 are occupied by women, including that of the Speaker and seven of the 19 Ministers. They also constitute seven of the 33 seats in the Senate. Half of the ten High Court judges are female.

A sodomy law exists but is reportedly not enforced. Homosexuality is considered taboo, but an LGBT support group, "Matrix", reportedly freely operates throughout the country.

Child labour is widespread.

=== Freedom of religion ===
Freedom of religion is observed in this dominantly Christian nation.

=== Freedom of speech ===
Freedom of speech is protected by the constitution.

==== Media and censorship ====
Independent newspapers and radio stations can freely criticize the government without repercussions. The government controls its largest radio station and only television station. The State shut down the transmissions of four private radio stations reporting on mass protests in August 2011; this was later blamed on a technical error.

Self-censorship is employed due to occasional libel suits by government ministers. There are no reports of government restrictions of the internet.

=== Legal system ===
There have been no recent reports of arbitrary arrests or political disappearances.

==== Torture ====
While the constitution prohibits the use of torture, reports of its use continue to surface. At least three prisoners died in police custody in 2011. On 3 March 2011 the wife of Tseliso Thatjane of Lithoteng, who allegedly stole a television and DVD player, was arrested and told she would only be released upon his surrender. After giving himself up, he was reportedly beaten with a club and suffocated with a plastic bag. A bribe of 500 maloti was paid for his release.

==== Prison conditions ====
Maseru Central Prison has been reported to have food shortages. Prison rape by gangs is supposedly rife, and due to the high HIV/AIDS rate in the country, considered especially dangerous. According to the Lesotho Correctional Service, 60% of female prisoners are HIV positive.

== International treaties ==
Lesotho's stances on international human rights treaties are as follows:

International treaties
| Treaty | Organization | Introduced | Signed | Ratified |
|---|---|---|---|---|
| Convention on the Prevention and Punishment of the Crime of Genocide | United Nations | 1948 | - | 1974 |
| International Convention on the Elimination of All Forms of Racial Discrimination | United Nations | 1966 | - | 1971 |
| International Covenant on Economic, Social and Cultural Rights | United Nations | 1966 | - | 1992 |
| International Covenant on Civil and Political Rights | United Nations | 1966 | - | 1992 |
| First Optional Protocol to the International Covenant on Civil and Political Rights | United Nations | 1966 | - | 2000 |
| Convention on the Non-Applicability of Statutory Limitations to War Crimes and Crimes Against Humanity | United Nations | 1968 | - | - |
| International Convention on the Suppression and Punishment of the Crime of Apartheid | United Nations | 1973 | - | 1983 |
| Convention on the Elimination of All Forms of Discrimination against Women | United Nations | 1979 | 1980 | 1995 |
| Convention against Torture and Other Cruel, Inhuman or Degrading Treatment or Punishment | United Nations | 1984 | - | 2001 |
| Convention on the Rights of the Child | United Nations | 1989 | 1990 | 1992 |
| Second Optional Protocol to the International Covenant on Civil and Political Rights, aiming at the abolition of the death penalty | United Nations | 1989 | - | - |
| International Convention on the Protection of the Rights of All Migrant Workers and Members of Their Families | United Nations | 1990 | 2004 | 2005 |
| Optional Protocol to the Convention on the Elimination of All Forms of Discrimination against Women | United Nations | 1999 | 2000 | 2004 |
| Optional Protocol to the Convention on the Rights of the Child on the Involvement of Children in Armed Conflict | United Nations | 2000 | 2000 | 2003 |
| Optional Protocol to the Convention on the Rights of the Child on the Sale of Children, Child Prostitution and Child Pornography | United Nations | 2000 | 2000 | 2003 |
| Convention on the Rights of Persons with Disabilities | United Nations | 2006 | - | 2008 |
| Optional Protocol to the Convention on the Rights of Persons with Disabilities | United Nations | 2006 | - | - |
| International Convention for the Protection of All Persons from Enforced Disappearance | United Nations | 2006 | 2010 | - |
| Optional Protocol to the International Covenant on Economic, Social and Cultural Rights | United Nations | 2008 | - | - |
| Optional Protocol to the Convention on the Rights of the Child on a Communications Procedure | United Nations | 2011 | - | - |

== See also ==
- Child labour in Lesotho
- Human trafficking in Lesotho
- LGBTQ rights in Lesotho
- Suicide in Lesotho

== Notes ==
1. Note that the "Year" signifies the "Year covered". Therefore the information for the year marked 2008 is from the report published in 2009, and so on.
2. As of 1 January.
3. The 1982 report covers 1981 and the first half of 1982, and the following 1984 report covers the second half of 1982 and the whole of 1983. In the interest of simplicity, these two aberrant "year and a half" reports have been split into three year-long reports through interpolation.
