= History of Lesotho =

Detailed history

Flag of Lesotho

The history of people living in the area now known as Lesotho (/ləˈsuːtuː, -ˈsoʊtoʊ/) goes back thousands of years. Present Lesotho (then called Basotholand) emerged as a single polity under King Moshoeshoe I in 1822. Under Moshoeshoe I, Basotho joined other clans in their struggle against the Lifaqane associated with famine and the reign of Shaka Zulu from 1818 to 1828.

The subsequent evolution of the state was shaped by contact with the British and Dutch colonists from Cape Colony. Missionaries invited by Moshoeshoe I developed orthography and printed works in the Sesotho language between 1837 and 1855. The country set up diplomatic channels and acquired guns for use against the encroaching Europeans and the Korana people. Territorial conflicts with both British and Boer settlers arose periodically, including Moshoeshoe's notable victory over the Boers in the Free State–Basotho War, but the final war in 1867 with an appeal to Queen Victoria, who agreed to make Basutoland a British suzerainty. In 1869, the British signed a treaty at Aliwal with the Boers that defined the boundaries of Basotholand and later Lesotho, which by ceding the western territories effectively reduced Moshoeshoe's kingdom to half its previous size.

The extent to which the British exerted direct control over Basotholand waxed and waned until Basotholand’s independence in 1966 when it became the Kingdom of Lesotho. However, when the ruling Basotho National Party (BNP) lost the first post-independence general elections to the Basotho Congress Party (BCP), Leabua Jonathan refused to cede and declared himself Tona Kholo ('prime minister'). The BCP began an insurrection that culminated in a January 1986 military coup, that then forced the BNP out of office. Power was transferred to King Moshoeshoe II, until then a ceremonial monarch, but forced into exile when he lost favor with the military the following year. His son was installed as Letsie III. Conditions remained tumultuous, including an August 1994 self-coup by Letsie, until 1998 when the Lesotho Congress for Democracy came to power in elections that were deemed fair by international observers. Despite protests from opposition parties, the country has remained relatively stable since that time.

== Ancient history ==
Lesotho's southern and eastern mountains (including Maloti) were occupied by the San people and their ancestors for thousands of years as evidenced by rock art. The San lived as semi nomadic hunter-gatherers.

At some stage, during their migration south from a tertiary dispersal area Bantu speaking peoples came to settle the lands that now make up Lesotho as well as a more extensive territory of fertile lands that surround modern-day Lesotho. The AmaZizi people are regarded as among the first to settle Lesotho in the aftermath of the Bantu expansion. The Zizi gained a reputation as skilled iron workers. Both the Zizi and neighboring tribes claimed that they originated from the Bantu settlers who would later branch out into the Nguni and the Sotho, garnering their leader considerable prestige.

== Medieval history ==
The Lesotho highlands attracted migrations by local hunter-gatherers between 550 and 1300 during the Medieval Warm Period, while the Drakensberg area was completely abandoned. Some of the highland inhabitants at the time also held cattle for food.

== Early modern history ==
There were several severe disruptions to the Basotho people in the early 19th century. One view states that the first of these were marauding Zulu clans, displaced from Zululand as part of the Lifaqane (or Mfecane), wrought havoc on the Basotho peoples they encountered as they moved first west and then north. The second that no sooner than the Zulu has passed to the north than the first Voortrekkers arrived, some of whom obtained hospitality during their difficult trek north. Early Voortrekker accounts describe how the lands surrounding the mountain retreat of the Basotho had been burnt and destroyed, in effect leaving a vacuum that subsequent Voortrekkers began to occupy.

However, this interpretation of history for the entire southern region of Africa is a matter of dispute. One attempt at refutation came by Norman Etherington in The Great Treks: The Transformation of Southern Africa, 1815-1854 (Longman, 2001). Etherington argues that no such thing as the Mfecane occurred, the Zulu were no more marauding than any other group in the region, and the land the Voortrekkers saw as empty was not settled by either Zulu or Basotho because those people did not value open lowland plains as pasture.

== Basutoland ==
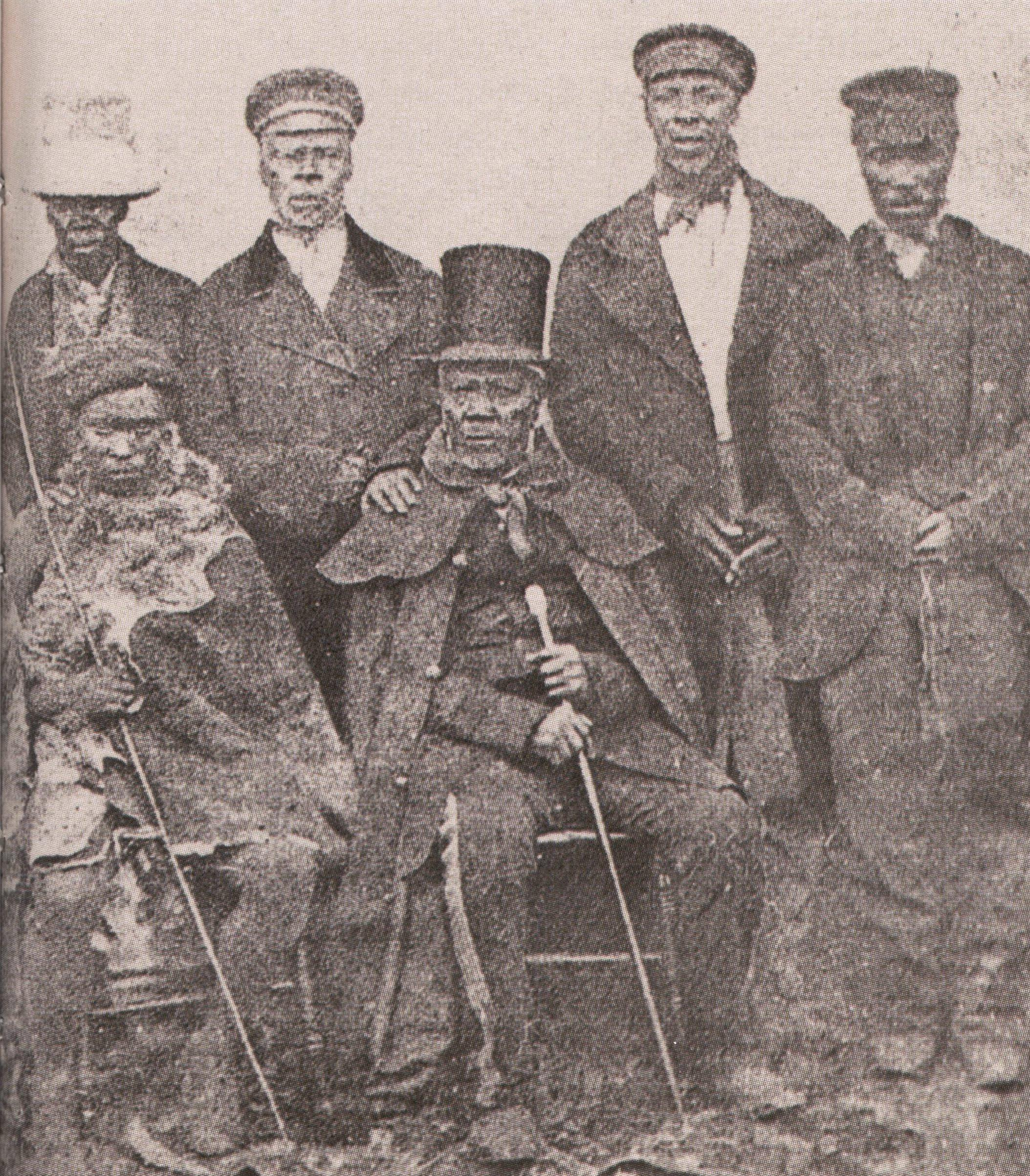
King Moshoeshoe I with his Ministers.

=== Free State–Basotho Wars ===
In 1818, Moshoeshoe I /moʊˈʃweɪʃweɪ/ consolidated various Basotho groupings and became their king. During Moshoeshoe's reign (1823–1870), a series of wars (1856–68) were fought with the Boers who had settled in traditional Basotho lands. These wars resulted in the extensive loss of land, now known as the "Lost Territory".

A treaty was signed with the Boers of Griqualand in 1843 and an agreement was made with the British in 1853 following a minor war. The disputes with the Boers over land, however, were revived in 1858 with Senekal's War and again, more seriously, in 1865 with the Seqiti War. The Boers had several military successes, killing possibly 1,500 Basotho soldiers, and annexed an expanse of arable land which they were able to retain following a treaty at Thaba Bosiu. Further conflict led to an unsuccessful attack on Thaba Bosiu and the death of a Boer commandant, Louw Wepener, but by 1867, much of Moshoeshoe's land and most of his fortresses had been taken.

Fearing defeat, Moshoeshoe made further appeals to High Commissioner Philip Wodehouse for British assistance. On 12 March 1868, the British Cabinet agreed to place the territory under British protection and the Boers were ordered to leave. In February 1869, the British and the Boers agreed to the Convention of Aliwal North, which defined the boundaries of the protectorate. The arable land west of the Caledon River remained in Boer's hands and is referred to as the Lost or Conquered Territory. Moshoeshoe died in 1870 and was buried atop Thaba Bosiu.

=== Annexation by the Cape Colony ===
In 1871 the protectorate was annexed to the Cape Colony. The Basotho resisted the British and in 1879 a southern chief, Moorosi, rose in revolt. His campaign was crushed, and he was killed in the fighting. The Basotho then began to fight amongst themselves over the division of Moorosi's lands. The British extended the Cape Peace Preservation Act of 1878 to cover Basutoland and attempted to disarm the natives. Much of the colony rose in revolt in the Gun War (1880-1881), inflicting significant casualties upon the colonial British forces sent to subdue it. A peace treaty of 1881 failed to quell sporadic fighting.

=== Return to crown colony ===
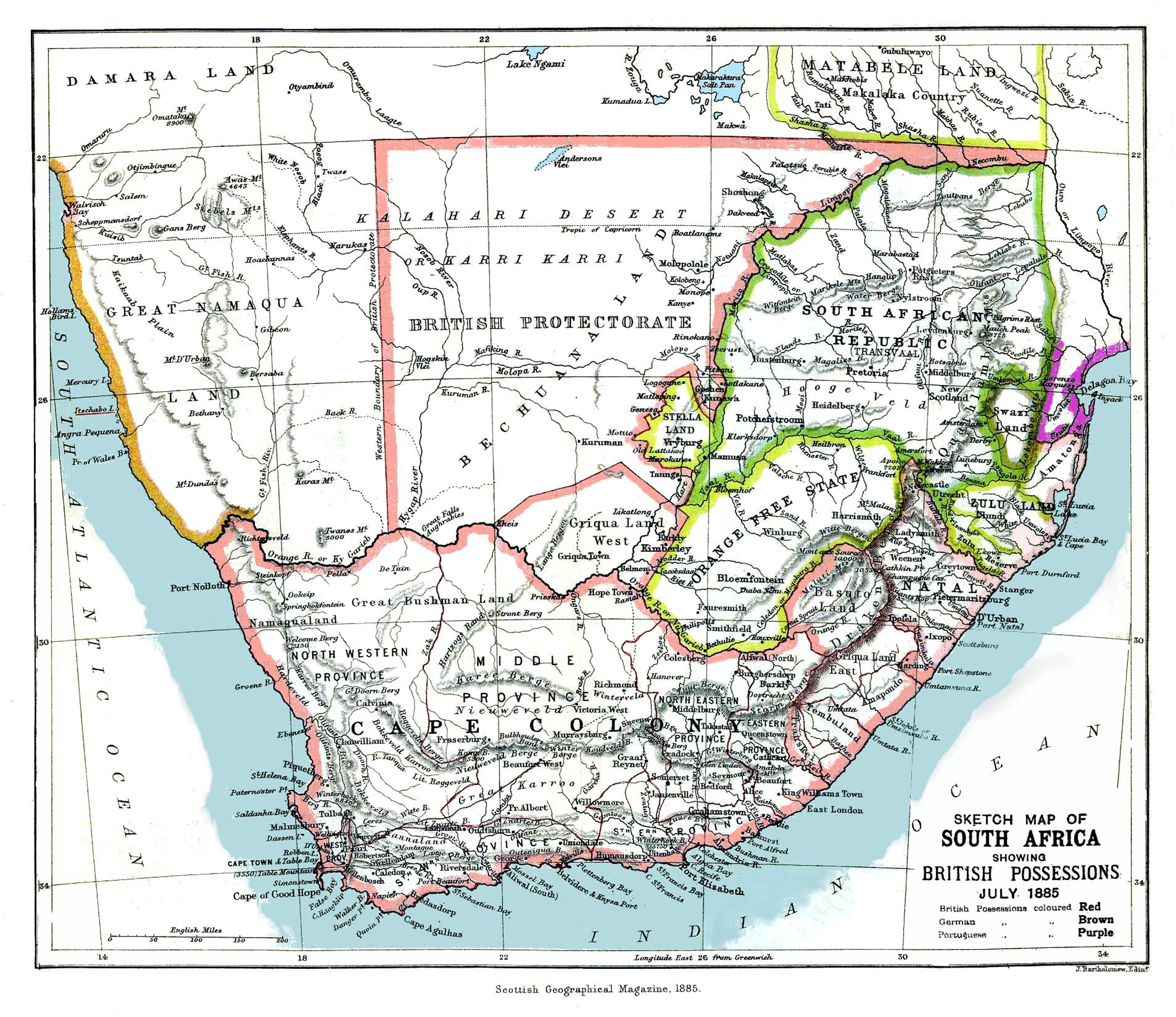
South Africa, Lesotho and Swaziland in 1885.

Cape Town's inability to control the territory led to its return to crown control in 1884 as the Territory of Basutoland. The colony was bound by the Orange River Colony, Natal Colony, and Cape Colony. It was divided into seven administrative districts: Berea, Leribe, Maseru, Mohale's Hoek, Mafeteng, Qacha's Nek and Quthing. The colony was ruled by the British Resident Commissioner, who worked through the pits (national assembly) of hereditary native chiefs under one paramount chief. Each chief ruled a ward within the territory. The first paramount chief was Lerothodi, the son of Moshoeshoe. During the Second Boer War the colony was neutral. The population grew from around 125,000 in 1875, to 310,000 in 1901, and 349,000 by 1904.

When the Union of South Africa was founded in 1910 the colony was still controlled by the British and moves were made to transfer it to the Union. However, the people of Basutoland opposed this and it did not occur.

During World War I, over 4,500 Basuto enlisted into the military, most of whom served in the South African Native Labour Corps which fought on the Western Front. In 1916, Basutoland raised over £40,000 for the war effort. A year later, the troopship SS Mendi was sunk off the coast of the Isle of Wight, and over 100 Basuto were killed in the sinking.

The differing fates of the seSotho-speaking peoples in the Protectorate of Basotholand and in the lands that became the Orange Free State are worth noting. The Orange Free State became a Boer-ruled territory. At the end of the Boer War, it was colonized by the British, and this colony was subsequently incorporated by Britain into the Union of South Africa as one of four provinces. It is still part of the modern-day Republic of South Africa, now known as the Free State. In contrast, Basotholand, along with the two other British Protectorates in the sub-Saharan region (Bechuanaland and Swaziland), was precluded from incorporation into the Union of South Africa. These protectorates were individually brought to independence by Britain in the 1960s. By becoming a protectorate, Basotholand, and its inhabitants were not subjected to Afrikaner rule, which saved them from experiencing Apartheid, and so generally prospered under more benevolent British rule. Basotho residents of Basotholand had access to better health services and education and came to experience greater political emancipation through independence. These lands protected by the British, however, had a much smaller capacity to generate income and wealth than had the "lost territory", which had been granted to the Boers.

Following the British entry into World War II, the decision was taken to draw recruits from the High Commission Territories (HTC) of Swaziland, Basutoland, and Bechuanaland. Black citizens from the HTC were to be recruited into the African Auxiliary Pioneer Corps (AAPC) labor unit due to Afrikaner opposition to armed black units. Mobilization for the AAPC was launched in late July 1941 and by October 18,000 personnel had arrived in the Middle East. The anti-colonial Basutoland Lekhotla la Bafo (Commoner's League) was banned and its leaders were imprisoned for demanding that training for the recruits be improved and encouraging desertion. The AAPC performed a wide range of manual labor, providing logistical support to the Allied war effort during the North African, Dodecanese and Italian campaigns. During the Italian campaign some AAPC relieved British field artillery units of their duty. On 1 May 1943, British troopship SS Erinpura was torpedoed and sunk, resulting in the loss of 694 men from AAPC's 1919th and 1927th Basuto Companies; the unit's worst loss of life during the war. A total of 21,000 Basuto enlisted during the war, 1,105 of whom perished during its course. Basuto women also contributed to the war effort by knitting warm clothing for the military.

From 1948, the South African National Party put its apartheid policies into place, indirectly terminating any support among Basutos and/or UK colonial authorities for the country's incorporation in South Africa.

After a 1955 request by the Basutoland Council to legislate its internal affairs, in 1959 a new constitution gave Basutoland its first elected legislature. This was followed in April 1965 with general legislative elections with universal adult suffrage in which the Basotho National Party (BNP) won 31 and the Basutoland Congress Party (BCP) won 25 of the 65 seats contested.

== Kingdom of Lesotho ==
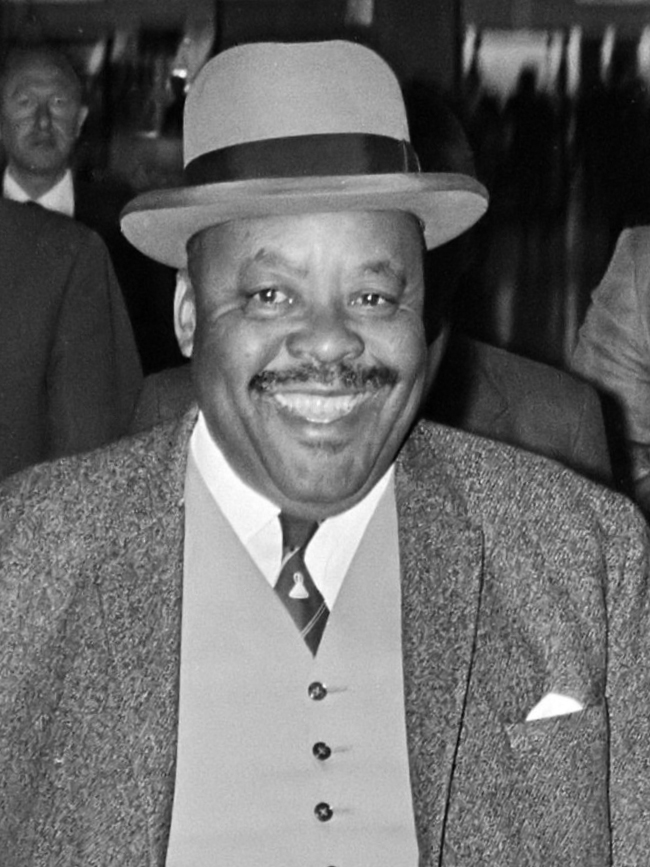
Leabua Jonathan in 1970

On October 4, 1966, the Kingdom of Lesotho attained full independence, governed by a constitutional monarchy with a bicameral Parliament consisting of a Senate and an elected National Assembly. Early results of the first post-independence elections in January 1970 indicated that the Basotho National Party (BNP) might lose control. Under the leadership of Prime Minister Chief Leabua Jonathan, the ruling BNP refused to cede power to the rival Basotholand Congress Party (BCP), although the BCP was widely believed to have won the elections. Citing election irregularities, Prime Minister Leabua Jonathan nullified the elections, declared a national state of emergency, suspended the constitution, and dissolved the Parliament. In 1973, an appointed Interim National Assembly was established. With an overwhelming pro-government majority, it was largely the instrument of the BNP, led by Prime Minister Jonathan. In addition to the Jonathan regime's alienation of Basotho powerbrokers and the local population, South Africa had virtually closed the country's land borders because of Lesotho's support of cross-border operations of the African National Congress (ANC). Moreover, South Africa publicly threatened to pursue more direct action against Lesotho if the Jonathan government did not root out the ANC presence in the country. This internal and external opposition to the government combined to produce violence and internal disorder in Lesotho that eventually led to a military takeover in 1986.

Under a January 1986 Military Council decree, state executive and legislative powers were transferred to the King who was to act on the advice of the Military Council, a self-appointed group of leaders of the Royal Lesotho Defense Force (RLDF). A military government chaired by Justin Lekhanya ruled Lesotho in coordination with King Moshoeshoe II and a civilian cabinet appointed by the King.

In February 1990, King Moshoeshoe II was stripped of his executive and legislative powers and exiled by Lekhanya, and the Council of Ministers was purged. Lekhanya accused those involved of undermining discipline within the armed forces, subverting existing authority, and causing an impasse on foreign policy that had been damaging to Lesotho's image abroad.

== Transition to democracy ==
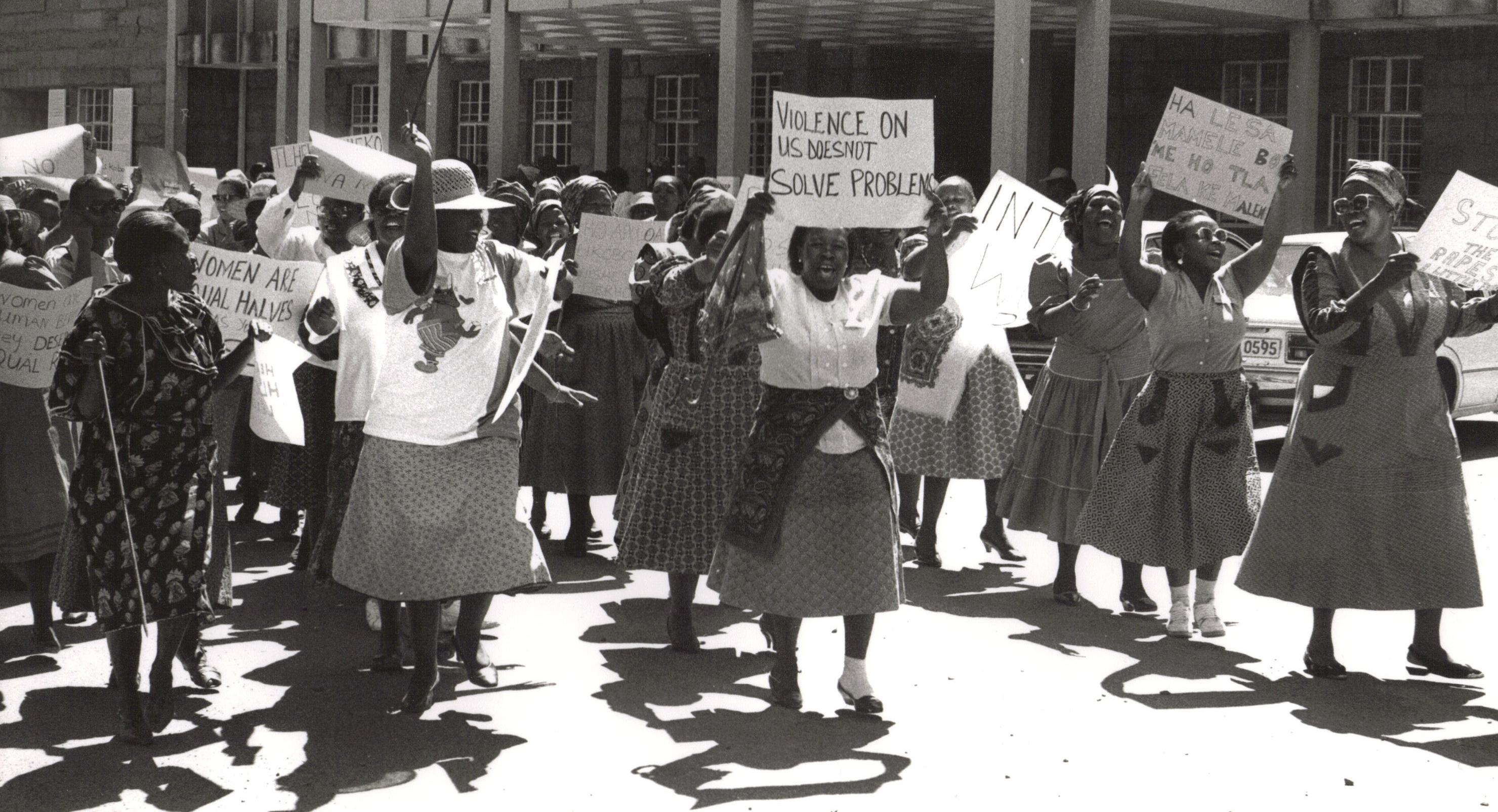
Lesotho women protesting against violence against women at a National Women's Day protest at the National University of Lesotho on 4 August 2008

Lekhanya announced the establishment of the National Constituent Assembly to formulate a new constitution for Lesotho to return the country to democratic, civilian rule by June 1992. Before this transition, however, Lekhanya was ousted in 1991 by a mutiny of junior army officers that left Phisoane Ramaema as Chairman of the Military Council.

Because Moshoeshoe II initially refused to return to Lesotho under the new rules of the government in which the King was endowed only with ceremonial powers, Moshoeshoe's son was installed as King Letsie III. In 1992, Moshoeshoe II returned to Lesotho as a regular citizen until 1995 when King Letsie abdicated the throne in favor of his father. After Moshoeshoe II died in a car accident in 1996, King Letsie III ascended to the throne again.

In 1993, a new constitution was implemented leaving the King without any executive authority and proscribing him from engaging in political affairs. Multiparty elections were then held in which the BCP ascended to power with a landslide victory. Prime Minister Ntsu Mokhehle headed the new BCP government that had gained every seat in the 65-member National Assembly. In early 1994, political instability increased as first the army, followed by the police and prison services, engaged in mutinies. In August 1994, King Letsie III, in collaboration with some members of the military, staged a coup, suspended Parliament, and appointed a ruling council. As a result of domestic and international pressures, however, the constitutionally elected government was restored within a month.

In 1995, there were isolated incidents of unrest, including a police strike in May to demand higher wages. For the most part, however, there were no serious challenges to Lesotho's constitutional order in the 1995-96 period. In January 1997, armed soldiers put down a violent police mutiny and arrested the mutineers.

In 1997, tension within the BCP leadership caused a split in which Dr. Mokhehle abandoned the BCP and established the Lesotho Congress for Democracy (LCD) followed by two-thirds of the parliament. This move allowed Mokhehle to remain as prime minister and leader of a new ruling party while relegating the BCP to opposition status. The remaining members of the BCP refused to accept their new status as the opposition party and ceased attending sessions. Multiparty elections were again held in May 1998.

Although Mokhehle completed his term as prime minister, due to his failing health, he did not vie for a second term in office. The elections saw a landslide victory for the LCD, gaining 79 of the 80 seats contested in the newly expanded Parliament. As a result of the elections, Mokhehle's Deputy Prime Minister, Pakalitha Mosisili, became the new prime minister. The landslide electoral victory caused opposition parties to claim that there were substantial irregularities in the handling of the ballots and that the results were fraudulent. The conclusion of the Langa Commission, a commission appointed by Southern African Development Community (SADC) to investigate the electoral process, however, was consistent with the view of international observers and local courts that the outcome of the elections was not affected by these incidents. While the report found the election results to be free of fraud or malpractice, opposition protests in the country intensified. The protests culminated in a violent demonstration outside the royal palace in early August 1998 and an unprecedented level of violence, looting, casualties, and destruction of property. In early September, junior members of the armed services mutinied. The Government of Lesotho requested that a SADC task force intervene to prevent a military coup and restore stability to the country. To this end, joint force, consisting of South African and (later) Botswana troops, entered Lesotho on September 22, 1998, to put down the mutiny and restore the democratically elected government. The army mutineers were brought before a court-martial.

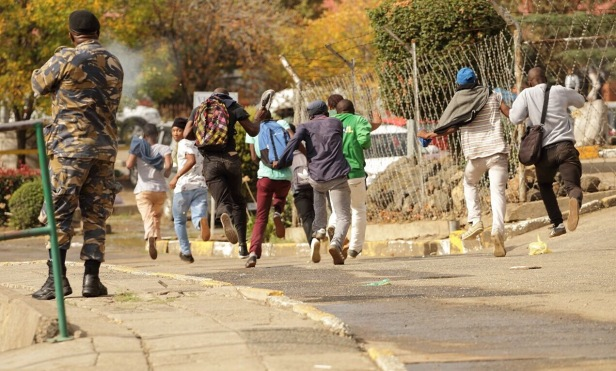
Students running as a police officer shoots in the back during the "Justice for Kalebe" protest, student killed at the National University of Lesotho in a protest held in June 2022

After stability returned to Lesotho, the SADC task force withdrew from the country in May 1999, leaving only a small task force (joined by Zimbabwe and troops) to provide training to the LDF. In the meantime, an Interim Political Authority (IPA), charged with reviewing the electoral structure in the country, was created in December 1998 and devised a proportional electoral system to ensure that there be opposition in the National Assembly. The new system retained the existing 80 elected Assembly seats but added 40 seats to be filled on a proportional basis. Elections were held under this new system in May 2002, and the LCD won again, gaining 54% of the vote. For the first time, however, opposition political parties won significant numbers of seats, and despite some irregularities and threats of violence from Major General Lekhanya, Lesotho experienced its first peaceful election. Nine opposition parties now hold all 40 of the proportional seats, with the BNP having the largest share (21). The LCD has 79 of the 80 constituency-based seats.

In June 2014, Prime Minister Thomas Thabane suspended parliament because of conflict within his coalition, leading to criticisms that he was undermining the government. In August, after Thabane attempted to remove Lieutenant General Kennedy Tlai Kamoli from the head of the army, the Prime Minister fled the country for three days, alleging a coup was taking place. Kamoli denied that any coup had occurred.

On 19 May 2020, Thomas Thabane formally stepped down as prime minister of Lesotho following months of pressure after he was named as a suspect in the murder of his ex-wife. Moeketsi Majoro, the economist and former Minister of Development Planning, was elected as Thabane's successor.

In June 2022, in protests against neoliberal and fiscal austerity policies that promoted cuts in resources for public education, Lesotho students were killed on the campus of the National University of Lesotho in the repression of the protest carried out by the Lesotho Mounted Police Service. On 28 October 2022, Sam Matekane was sworn in as Lesotho's new prime minister after forming a new coalition government. His Revolution for Prosperity party, formed earlier same year, won the 7 October elections.

== See also ==
- History of Africa
- History of South Africa
- History of Southern Africa
- List of heads of government of Lesotho
- List of Kings of Lesotho
- Politics of Lesotho
- Sotho people

== Sources ==
- Clothier, Norman (1991). "The Erinpura: Basotho Tragedy". South African Military History Society Journal. 8 (5). ISSN 0026-4016. Archived from the original on 16 January 2020.
- Mitchell, Peter; Arthur, Charles; Pinto, Hugo; Capelli, Christian (2022). "Moshebi's shelter at fifty: reinvestigating the Later Stone Age of the Sehlabathebe Basin, Lesotho". Quaternary International. 611–612: 163–176. doi:10.1016/j.quaint.2020.04.040.
- Nombulelo Ntabeni, Mary (2008). "Military Labour Mobilisation in Colonial Lesotho During World War II, 1940–1943". Scientia Militaria: South African Journal of Military Studies. 36 (2) (online ed.): 36–58. doi:10.5787/36-2-51. OCLC 786943260. Archived from the original on 11 March 2018.
- Oliver, Roland, ed. (1977). The Cambridge History of Africa, Volume 3: From c.1050 to c.1600. Cambridge University Press. ISBN 978-0-521-20981-6. OCLC 59023418.
- Rosenberg, Scott; Weisfelder, Richard; Frisbie-Fulton, Michelle (2004). Historical Dictionary of Lesotho. The Scarecrow Press. ISBN 0-8108-4871-6.
- Shackleton, Deborah Ann (1997). Imperial Military Policy and the Bechuanaland Pioneers and Gunners during the Second World War (PDF) (PhD thesis). Indiana University. OCLC 38033601.
- Sipho Simelane, Hamilton (1993). "Labor Mobilization for the War Effort in Swaziland, 1940–1942". The International Journal of African Historical Studies. 26 (3): 541–574. doi:10.2307/220478. ISSN 0361-7882. JSTOR 220478.
