= 1994 Lesotho coup d'état =

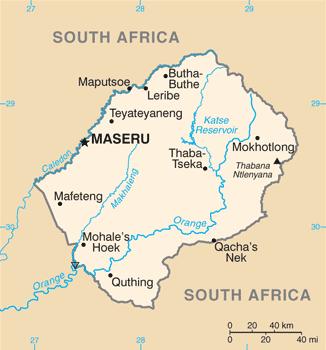
Date	August 17, 1994
Location	Maseru, Lesotho
Result	Self-coup successful: BCP government reinstalled in negotiations in September

Belligerents
Monarchy of Lesotho; Basotho National Party; Marematlou Freedom Party	Basutoland Congress Party

Commanders and leaders
Letsie III; Moshoeshoe II; Hae Phoofolo	Ntsu Mokhehle

Casualties and losses
- 4 civilians killed, 10 injured in protests

The 1994 Lesotho coup d'état was a successful self-coup in Lesotho by King Letsie III along with the military and the backing of several political parties against the democratically elected Basutoland Congress Party (BCP) government led by Ntsu Mokhehle. Using a petition signed by two political parties (the Basotho National Party and the Marematlou Freedom Party) which called for the dissolution of the present Lesotho government and the restoration of his father Moshoeshoe II as monarch as pretext, he promptly suspended parts of the constitution, dissolved parliament, and replaced the government with an appointed provisional council that would govern until promised elections.

In the following day on August 18, a protest held by thousands of BCP supporters denouncing the king's illegal and unconstitutional power-grab in the nation's capital of Maseru turned violent, resulting in four deaths and at least ten injuries.

From August 17 until September 14, the appointed provisional council, consisting of Hae Phoofolo (chairperson), Mamello Morrison, Retselisitsoe Sekhonyana, Monyake Moletsane, Khauta Khasu and Mathabiso Mosala, managed the country with Hae Phoofolo acting as de facto Prime Minister. Through mediations by the Southern African Development Community (SADC), namely Botswana, Zimbabwe, and South Africa, the BCP government was finally reinstated following the signing of the Memorandum of Understanding of the Measures and Procedures Relating to the Restoration of Constitutional Order in Lesotho.

The agreement stipulated the cancellation of the commission investigating Moshoeshoe II's dethronement, immunity for King Letsie III and the coup participants from legal actions and otherwise, among other things. Moshoeshoe II ultimately was restored to power in 1995 with his son abdicating the throne. In 1996 however, he died in a car accident, resulting in Letsie III once again becoming king.
