= 1965 Basutoland general election =

- 29 April 1965

60 seats in the National Assembly 31 seats needed for a majority
- Registered: 416,952
- Turnout: 62.79%
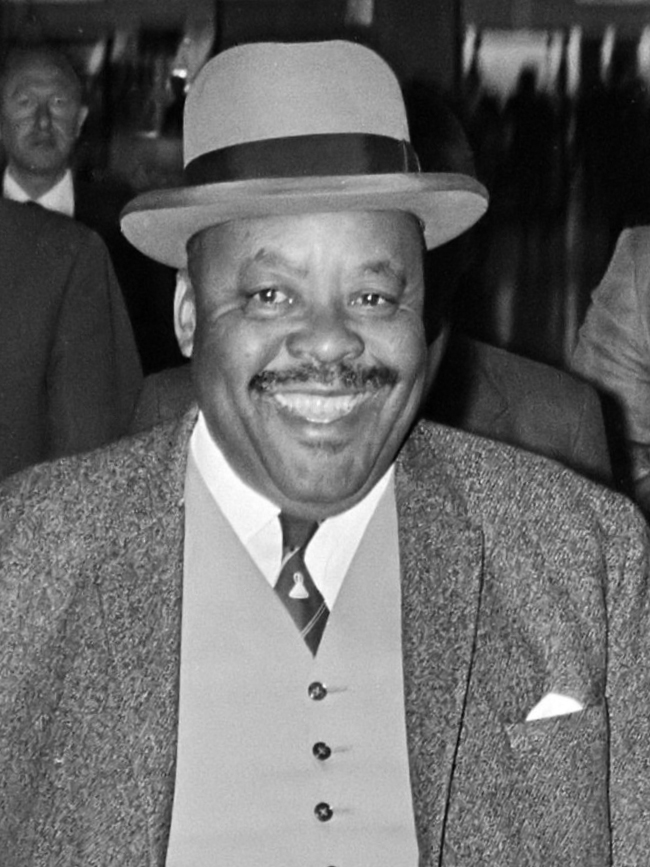

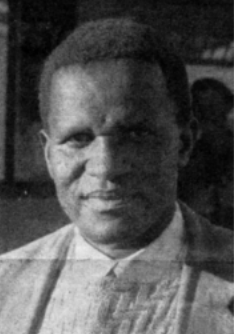

	Majority party	Minority party	Third party
Leader	Leabua Jonathan	Ntsu Mokhehle	Seth Makotoko
Party	BNP	BCP	MFP
Seats won	31	25	4
Popular vote	108,140	103,068	40,414
Percentage	42.01%	40.04%	15.70%
Elected Prime Minister
Sekhonyana Maseribane
BNP

General elections were held in Basutoland on 29 April 1965. The result was a narrow victory for the Basotholand National Party, which led the country to independence as Lesotho on 4 October the following year. Voter turnout was 63%.

== Results ==
Party	Votes	%	Seats	+/–
Basutoland National Party	108,140	42.01	31	+30
Basutoland Congress Party	103,068	40.04	25	–5
Marematlou Freedom Party	40,414	15.70	4	New
Marema-Tlou Party	5,697	2.21	0	–5
Independents	79	0.03	0	–4
Total	257,398	100.00	60	–20
Valid votes	257,398	98.31		
Invalid/blank votes	4,426	1.69		
Total votes	261,824	100.00		
Registered voters/turnout	416,952	62.79		
Source: Nohlen et al.
