= 2014 Lesotho political crisis =

Alleged coup d'état in Southern Africa

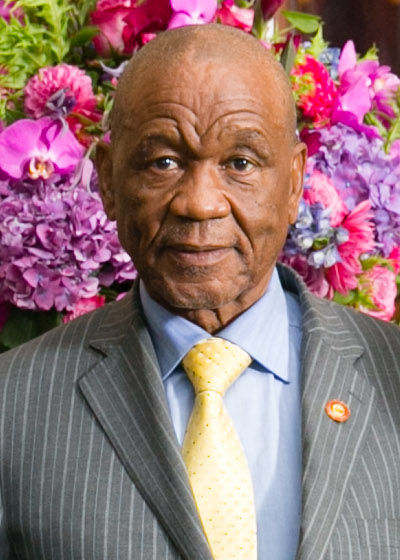
- Tom Thabane was elected as Prime Minister in 2012
Date	30 August 2014
Location	Lesotho
Result	Coup attempt failed: Early election called; Initial flight of prime minister and eventual return under South African police protection

Belligerents
Lesotho Police; Government of Lesotho	Lesotho Army; Government of Lesotho

Commanders and leaders
Prime Minister Tom Thabane	Lieutenant General Kennedy Tlali Kamoli; Deputy Prime Minister Mothetjoa Metsing

Casualties and losses
1 policeman	

On 30 August 2014, Lesotho's Prime Minister Tom Thabane alleged that a coup d'état had been launched against him. This followed a previous allegation which caused him to suspend parliament over possible extra-constitutional manoeuvres. It also followed pressure from South Africa to maintain the democratic process. The next day, Deputy Prime Minister Mothetjoa Metsing assumed responsibility for running the government. An early election was held in February 2015 as a result of South African-led Southern African Development Community (SADC) mediation, giving power to the opposition.

== Background ==
Following the general election of 2012, the All Basotho Convention's Tom Thabane was elected as prime minister as head of a three party coalition after ousting long-serving prime minister Pakalitha Mosisili. On 19 June 2014, Thabane suspended parliament over fears of a coup d'état, allowing him to avoid a vote of confidence; this was sanctioned by King Letsie III. In reaction, the South African government issued a statement that read it

notes with concern the unfolding political and security situation in the Kingdom of Lesotho which has resulted in the prorogation of the country's parliament. The South African government has further noted with grave concern the unusual movements of the Lesotho Defence Force Units in the capital, Maseru. South Africa will not tolerate any unconstitutional change of government in the region and continent.

Deputy Prime Minister Mothetjoa Metsing also suggested he would form a new government upon Thabane's removal. Meanwhile, in addition to South Africa, the Southern African Development Community also warned the political rivals of unconstitutional changes of government which would not be tolerated.

== Coup d'état ==
On 30 August, at about 3:00 gunshots were heard in Maseru. Though the city was calm later in the day, people were said to be staying at home. Though there were no reports of deaths, the Lesotho Times termed it a "bloodless coup attempt." The army was said to have acted after Thabane tried to remove its chief, Lieutenant General Kennedy Tlali Kamoli, but the army said he was still in charge and that the military "supports the democratically elected government of the day." Army spokesman Major Ntlele Ntoi denied staging a coup saying: "There is nothing like that, the situation has returned to normalcy...the military has returned to their barracks." This followed a military presence on the streets of the capital and radio stations, including private ones and Radio Lesotho, being taken off air and phone lines cut, but they were working later in the day. Sports Minister Thesele Maseribane said that soldiers had surrounded State House, including government and police headquarters. He added that an unnamed military commander was looking for him, Thabane and Mothetjoa Metsing to take to the king and that "in our country, that means a coup" yet he insisted Thabane's government was still in control of the country. A reinforced military contingent was reportedly guarding Thabane's official residence and that soldiers were patrolling the streets of Maseru. The military had also disarmed police.

Thabane said he fled to South Africa amid fear for his life and that he would return when his safety could be assured. He added that the alleged coup had left the government unable to function and that he had been forced out by unlawful means. He left with his family after getting reports he was targeted for assassination. He later said the action resulted from an utterly undisciplined military with personnel roaming the city indimidating citizens and making outright threats against his life. He further did not name the military officer he claimed lead the disorder but did say that it was a reaction to his government's attempt to stem corruption; while he also called for SADC to help restore order. Conversely, officials who denied the coup plot said that they had moved against police elements suspected of trying to arm a political faction and that soldiers had returned to their barracks. One policeman was killed in the incident.

=== Aftermath ===
The next day, Metsing assumed responsibility for running the government. Following calls by Thabane for South African peacekeepers, by 3 September, South African police had escorted Thabane back to Maseru, according to Assistant Police Commissioner Lehloka Maphatsoe. Police Commissioner Khothatso Tsooana said that the South African police were present for extra security and that he had ordered the Lesotho police to return to work after being told to stop work and not wear uniforms to prevent attacks on police. Metsing also said the leader of the third party in the coalition also returned to Lesotho. The SADC added that it was sending an envoy and an observer team to help restore stability and security; while Lesotho's leaders agreed on a roadmap with a "clear timeline" towards removing the parliamentary suspension and agreed to release a joint statement "appealing for calm and exercise restraint with a view to rapidly bring law and order back in the kingdom."

A 12 September deadline to reach a consensus was passed without agreement. South Africa Deputy President Cyril Ramaphosa then took responsibility from Jacob Zuma's mediation efforts to get an agreement amongst the governing coalition. Chief among the discussion was the re-calling of the legislature. As a result of the failure, South Africa called for an emergency meeting of the SADC. One of those who fled the country, Thesele Maseribane, then asked: "How can you open your own parliament when you still have foreign troops here, protecting you? Everyone’s interested in parliament, but what about what recently happened here? This is not a movie. This is reality. This was an attempted coup." Deputy Prime Minister Mothetjoa Metsing's Lesotho Congress for Democracy (LCD) and General Kamoli were both held responsible for the revolt. Kamoli gathered weapons from government stockpiles in preparation for a possible showdown, while his allies warned that his ouster would cause terrible blood-letting. The SADC has also rebuffed calls by some domestic leaders for a military intervention, instead opting for a political resolution.

On 30 September, under the SADC mandate to help creating dialogue, Ramaphosa arrived in the country. In ongoing developments at the time, Senate Chief Whip Khoabane Theko said that the prime minister's office had too much constitutional power and there was no provision for coalition dispute resolution, yet he also rejected calls to involve the king. He suggested that the root cause involved Kamoli's refusal give up his assignment of leading the Lesotho Defence force in favor of Lieutenant General Maaparankoe Mahao, who Thabane had tapped to replace him. It could, however, also worsen if the sitting prime minister was ousted.

Members of the police forces of both South Africa and Namibia then guarded Thabane and unnamed allies in the country both day and night. In a resolution to the conflict, the Maseru Facilitation Declaration was signed. The scheduled election was brought forward by two years and would occur in February 2015. The announcement was made by Ramaphosa, who added that the exact date would be determined by King Letsie III. Russia also welcomed the deal.

On 17 October, parliament reconvened in a bid to avert the political crisis. Senate Chief Whip Khoabane Theko saw it as the beginning of the resumption of the electoral process. Parliament was officially re-convened in October by Letsie III and was celebrated by opposition MPs.

== Investigation ==
Lesotho police opened an investigation into two of its employees over treason and murder for being allegedly complicit in working with the military.The two police officers under investigation were having their cellphones sent to South Africa where Bloemfontein police were checking for "suspicious communications" and if there were signs of deletions in the phones' memories. Masupha hosted a meeting of all officers to hear any complaints. Assertions were made that management was not trustworthy and that some of them had taken a part in the chaos. He look to assure the officers and they could approach him anonymously with information.

== Reactions ==
Domestic

Minister Thesele Maseribane, a possible target in the putsch, said that the accusation did not take him by surprise and that, since Kamoli and Metsing were being examined for signs of malfeasance in office, they tried to topple the government in order to stop this. Police officers who were there on 30 August reported that soldiers ordered police files on two officers be produced.

International

South Africa's International Relations Department's spokesperson Clayson Monyela said: "The department will either convene a media briefing or issue a statement later today regarding the situation in Lesotho." He also added that though no one claimed, the action had the appearance of a coup. Following the return of Thabane, the Methodist Church of Southern Africa welcomed the calmness in the country with Bishop Zipho Siwa saying prayers were offered for a nonviolent resolution.
