= 2012 Lesotho general election =

- 26 May 2012
- All 120 seats in the National Assembly; 61 seats needed for a majority
- Turnout: 50.04%
Party	Leader	Vote %	Seats	+/–
DC	Pakalitha Mosisili	39.58	48	New
ABC	Tom Thabane	25.18	30	+13
LCD	Mothetjoa Metsing	21.94	26	−3
BNP	Justin Lekhanya	4.31	5	+2
PFD	Lekhetho Rakuoane	2.02	3	+2
NIP		1.25	2	−19
LPC		0.91	1	0
BDNP		0.62	1	0
MFP		0.60	1	0
BCP		0.46	1	0
BBDP		0.44	1	0
LWP		0.44	1	−9
This lists parties that won seats. See the complete results below.
Prime Minister before	Prime Minister after election
Pakalitha Mosisili; DC	Tom Thabane; ABC

General elections were held in Lesotho on 26 May 2012. The incumbent Prime Minister Pakalitha Mosisili's newly formed Democratic Congress won a majority of single-member seats. He also won his seat by the second-largest margin of victory. However, they only had a plurality in the overall tally and coalition talks are taking place.

== Background ==
As a result of the impact of the Arab Spring in 2011, the government faced protests over unemployment, poverty and low salaries. The protests eventually had the support of taxi drivers, trade unions, students and opposition political parties. The protest leaders also demanded to meet Prime Minister Pakalitha Mosisili, who had at times refused to do so.

Following a dispute over the allocation of the proportional seats in the 2007 elections, the electoral system was amended, with the National Assembly Elections Order 1992 repealed and replaced by the National Assembly Elections Act 2011. The previous system of casting separate votes for a constituency candidate and a national party list was replaced by voters casting a single vote for a party, which was counted for both the constituency candidate and the national party list.

== Parties and campaign ==
Before the election, the ruling Lesotho Congress for Democracy suffered a split because of Prime Minister Pakalitha Mosisili's refusal to cede power. He then founded a new party called the Ntsu Democratic Congress, in reference to the founder of the LCD Ntsu Mokhehle. The LCD's secretary-general Mothetjoa Metsing then moved to lead the LCD.

Tom Thabane ledanother faction that had broken away in 2006, the All Basotho Convention, which is expected to benefit from the infighting of the other two parties. Voters' primary demands were reportedly job creation and an improvement in "basic services." The LCD's Metsing said that he would not take part in a national unity government. In like measure ABC ruled out working with LCD.

== Opinion polls ==
Most polls predicted a plurality for the Democratic Congress. One tribal chief, Mohato Bereng, said that he would vote for change in supporting the Lesotho Congress for Democracy. Incumbent Prime Minister Pakalitha Mosisili had an approval of rating of 39% a month before the election. Two days before the election, Mosisili said that DC would get a simple majority.

== Conduct ==
Former Malawian President Bakili Muluzi, who headed the Commonwealth of Nations' electoral observer team, said that despite a history of coup d'etats he was assured by the army and police that there would be no interference. There were also electoral monitoring teams from the African Union and the Southern African Development Community.

== Results ==
Voting centres were opened from 7:00 at 17:00. Vote counting started at the vote centres in Maseru before they closed. The official results were expected the day after the vote due to the remoteness of some communities. Maliako Ralejoe of the Independent Electoral Commission said at the end of the day that: "Currently most of the urban areas have been counted, which is a good indicator. We have had challenges with the rural areas as some areas are still counting, but Maseru is complete. We estimate that [on 29 May] we will be able to announce the final verdict." On 27 May, the IEC suspended the electoral count because of "serious logistical problems." This caused tension in Maseru and opposition parties led by ABC pressured the IEC to release the result.

Voter turnout was 564,451 or 50.04%.

Party	Votes	%	Seats			
Party	Votes	%	FPTP	PR	Total	+/–
Democratic Congress	218,366	39.58	41	7	48	New
All Basotho Convention	138,917	25.18	26	4	30	+13
Lesotho Congress for Democracy	121,076	21.94	12	14	26	–3
Basotho National Party	23,788	4.31	0	5	5	+2
Popular Front for Democracy	11,166	2.02	1	2	3	+2
National Independent Party	6,880	1.25	0	2	2	–19
Lesotho People's Congress	5,021	0.91	0	1	1	0
Basotho Democratic National Party	3,433	0.62	0	1	1	0
Marematlou Freedom Party	3,300	0.60	0	1	1	0
Basutoland Congress Party	2,531	0.46	0	1	1	0
Basotho Batho Democratic Party	2,440	0.44	0	1	1	0
Lesotho Workers' Party	2,408	0.44	0	1	1	–9
All Democratic Corporation	1,933	0.35	0	0	0	New
Lekhotla La Mekhoa le Moetlo	1,691	0.31	0	0	0	New
Areka Covenant Front for Development	1,227	0.22	0	0	0	New
Sankatana Social Democratic Party	1,081	0.20	0	0	0	New
African Unity Movement	714	0.13	0	0	0	New
White Horse Party	252	0.05	0	0	0	New
Independents	5,502	1.00	0	0	0	0
Total	551,726	100.00	80	40	120	0
Valid votes	551,726	97.75				
Invalid/blank votes	12,725	2.25				
Total votes	564,451	100.00				
Registered voters/turnout	1,127,980	50.04				
Source: IEC, IEC, AED

=== List of elected MPs ===
Constituency Number	District	Constituency	MP	Party
37	Maseru District	Abia	Motsoahae Thomas Thabane	ABC
33	Maseru District	Thetsane	Mamothibe Bernice Chaule	ABC
35	Maseru District	Lithotheng	Majoro Nephtali Mohapi	ABC
34	Maseru District	Qoaling	Chalane Clatus Phori	ABC
32	Maseru District	Maseru##	Edward Haae Phoofolo	ABC
55	Mafeteng District	Mafeteng#	Temeki Phoenix Tsolo	ABC
24	Berea District	Teya-Teyanang#	Prince Maliehe Maliehe	ABC
5	Butha-Buthe District	Butha-Buthe#	Motlohi Maliehe	ABC
28	Berea District	Khubetsoana	Thabiso Masenkane Samuel Monyatsi	ABC
2	Butha-Buthe District	Hololo	Teboho Charles Letsela	DC
58	Mohales Hoek	Mohale's Hoek#	Retselisitsoe Masenyetsi	DC
57	Mohales Hoek	Qhalasi	Palo Alphoncis Leteete	DC
4	Butha-Buthe District	Qalo	Thabang Linus Kholumo	PFD
53	Mafeteng District	Likhoele	Khotso Letsasi	DC
14	Leribe District	Tsikoane	Khotso Matla	LCD
15	Leribe District	Maputsoe	Mampho Marystella Mokhele	LCD
23	Berea District	Khafung	Motlalepula Khaahloe	LCD
30	Maseru District	Motimposo	November Pitso Maisa	ABC
38	Maseru District	Thaba-Bosiu	Boomo Frank Sofonia	ABC
49	Mafeteng District	Kolo	Paul Teboho Lehloyenya	DC
54	Mafeteng District	Qalabane	Motlalentoa Letsosa	DC
18	Leribe District	Kolonyama	Lebesa Maloi	LCD
17	Leribe District	Peka	Tlali Khasu	ABC
16	Leribe District	Likhetlane	Timothy Thahane Thahane	LCD
8	Leribe District	Thaba-Phats'oa	Mahala Molapo	ABC
9	Leribe District	Mahobong	Mothejoa Metsing	LCD
11	Leribe District	Matlakeng	Mafalatsi Joyce Lekhatla	LCD
22	Berea District	Malimong	Magents Leshoboro Joseph Mohlajoa	ABC
25	Berea District	Tsoana-Makhulo	Joseph Tsoeu Molise	ABC
29	Berea District	Mabote	Paul Sekhulumi Ntsoaole	ABC
42	Maseru District	Koro-Koro	Thabiso Enerst Litšiba	ABC
48	Mafeteng District	Thaba-Phechela	Molahlehi Malefane	DC
52	Mafeteng District	Thabana-Morena	Selibe Mochoboroane	LCD
56	Mohales Hoek	Taung	Phallang Monare**	DC
71	Qachas Nek	Tsoelike	Pakalitha Bethuel Mosisili	DC
12	Leribe District	Leribe	Leketekete Victor Ketso	LCD
27	Berea District	Berea	Matela Solomon Khojane	ABC
20	Berea District	'Makhoroana	Charles Nyebe Tsibela	ABC
13	Leribe District	Hlotse#	Makabelo Priscilla Mosothoane	LCD
3	Butha-Buthe District	Motete	Tumaole Clement Lerafa	DC
50	Mafeteng District	Matelile	Maimane Philemon Maphathe	DC
26	Berea District	Thupa-Kubu	Tsietsi Ezekiel Lethole	ABC
1	Butha-Buthe District	Mechachane	Apesi Ratsele	LCD
10	Leribe District	Pela-Ts'oeu	Solomon Montsuoe Lethoba	LCD
59	Mohales Hoek	Mekaling	Kamoho Joseph Moroeng	DC
41	Maseru District	Maama	Mankoe James Maime	ABC
36	Maseru District	Lithabaneng	Matebatso Doti	ABC
6	Leribe District	Maliba-Matso	Francis Mokoto Hloaele	DC
7	Leribe District	Mphosong	Bataung Leleka	DC
31	Maseru District	Stadium Area	Moshoete Mophato Monyake	ABC
39	Maseru District	Machache	Monyane Moleleki	DC
43	Maseru District	Qeme	Kali SeitLheko	DC
44	Maseru District	Rothe	Manthabiseng Arcylia Phohleli	DC
45	Maseru District	Matsieng	’Matšepo Ramakoae***	ABC
46	Maseru District	Makhaleng	Mootsi Samuel Lehata	DC
74	Thaba-Tseka District	Thaba-Tseka#	Maneo Mathabo Nelly Moremoholo	DC
19	Berea District	Mosalemane	Liau Amos Ntlele****	DC
21	Berea District	Bela-Bela	Litsoane Simon Litsoane	ABC
51	Mafeteng District	Maliepetsane	Michael Mpalipali Molefe	ABC
60	Mohales Hoek	Qaqatu	Lethusang Daniel Kompi	DC
64	Quthing District	Tele	Ndiwuhleli Ndlomose*****	DC
69	Qachas Nek	Qacha's Nek#	Pontšo Matumelo Susan Sekatle	DC
40	Maseru District	Thaba-Putsoa	Tsukutlane Joel Au	DC
61	Mohales Hoek	Mpharane	Phutuhelo Daniel Mafereka	DC
76	Thaba-Tseka District	Mashai	Tšoeu Phineas Mokeretla	DC
78	Mokhotlong District	Senqu	Likeleli Tampane Monare	DC
79	Mokhotlong District	Mokhotlong#	Tlohang Sekhamane	DC
65	Quthing District	Moyeni	Mahooana Rapitso George Khati	DC
47	Maseru District	Maletsunyane	Lawson Kotiti Diholo	DC
67	Quthing District	Mount Moorosi	Kose Julius Makoa	DC
77	Mokhotlong District	Malingoaneng	Serealong Kemuel Qoo	DC
66	Quthing District	Sebapala	Kabelo Mafura	DC
68	Quthing District	Qhoali	Mathibeli Edwin Mokhothu	DC
75	Thaba-Tseka District	Semena	Jobo Joseph Sekautu	DC
70	Qachas Nek	Lebakeng	Henry Semano Sekatle*	DC
62	Mohales Hoek	Ketane	Marefuoe Alice Muso	DC
63	Mohales Hoek	Hloahloeng	Ntlhoi Motsamai	DC
72	Thaba-Tseka District	Mantsonyane	Masuthang Agnes Taole	DC
73	Thaba-Tseka District	Thaba-Moea	MokhokolI Bethuel Seutloali	DC
80	Mokhotlong District	Bobatsi	Makhabane Gilbert Maluke	DC

* Largest margin of victory by just over 92.9% of votes.
**Won by 33 votes over ABC's Ramoshebi Maboee Moletsane (39 ballots were "rejected").
***Won by 39 votes over DC's Mokhele Stephen Moletsane (19 ballots were "rejected").
****Won by 94 voted over ABC's Tsoinyana Samuel Rapapa (161 ballots were "rejected")
*****Smallest margin of victory by 14 votes over LCD's Doreen Chaoana-Mapetsa (47 ballots were "rejected")
#District capital
##District and national capital

=== Reactions ===
Ramahoana Matlosa, who lost his bid to become an MP from Maseru District, sad that the DC failed to attract the youth vote. "Of course we knew the ABC would be strong in urban areas. But if you add our numbers to the LCDs, we would have beaten them. It's just that the ABC had an advantage because their number stayed the same and we split." The AU and SADC monitoring teams said of the election that "we are delighted that the voting and counting took place in an atmosphere of peace and tranquility."

Electoral observers said the election was largely free and fair. The Commonwealth of Nations' Bakili Muluzi said that "we chose democracy in Africa. And we should allow democracy to prevail.

== Government formation ==
An unnamed senior party member of DC said that they had begun coalition talks with ABC, but would also look to open talks with LCD if those failed. He also said that the party could try to lure in individual MPs from the other parties if all options failed, while adding that "we are confident that we will lead the new government. We are also not political buffoons not to know that we have to start serious engagements with any coalition partners immediately." DC upped their attempts to build a coalition with LCD upon realising they would not get a majority after proportional seats were allocated. Confidantes to ABC's Thabane said that he was confident of winning the seats necessary to head a coalition government with the other parties, who could possibly get a share of the proportionally allocated seats. An unnamed party member said that "we are in serious discussions with the LCD but most will depend on the final tally of the seats. The LCD is our first preference for any coalition as we have all been in the opposition," but that this was subject to the proportional seats being allocated "properly."

On 30 May, ABC's Thabane told the BBC that he had formed a coalition to give him a majority in parliament. His coalition included the LCD, Basotho National Party, Popular Front for Democracy and the Marematlou Freedom Party. He also said that the government's priorities would be "poverty, lack of jobs, lack of school opportunities, absence of schools at the right places, lack of proper infrastructure, particularly health services. We have gone way below what we were a few years ago, and that's inexplicable. We put power in the hands of the wrong people and we are taking it away from them."

Mosisili resigned on 31 May and would be the Leader of the Opposition. Following this Lincoln Ralechate Mokose, the secretary general of DC, said the party would seek coalition partners and that "we will either succeed or fail. [If the party fails] our stand is to concede and work in parliament as opposition." ABC's secretary-general, Thabiso Litšiba, said it could be a week before the new parliament meets and officially chooses the new Prime Minister.

== Analysis ==
Prior to the vote, Hoolo 'Nyane, the director of the Transformation Resource Centre, said that the lack of a governing coalition "would be a very disturbing scenario. [A repeat of the 1998 stand-off and violence which led to the death of 58 locals and eight South African soldiers, as well as large damages in Maseru were] not completely unlikely." He added that "the entire young and urban vote is in revolt against Mosisili."

The coordinator of development for Peace Education, which monitored the election, Sofonea Shale, said that "maybe the politics of arrogance have come to an end, and we'd be turning a new page based on politics of negotiation. A coalition government is highly likely, which is why I'm saying it's time for a new era. A coalition needs parties to negotiate."

On 29 May, the Lesotho Times reported that the LCD were likely to be "heavily compensated" by the proportionally allotted seats due to finishing second in many constituencies. Most DC votes were in rural areas, while politicians and observers said that an ABC-LCD coalition was likely.
