= Lesotho Liberation Army =

Anti-apartheid guerrilla army in Lesotho

The Lesotho Liberation Army (LLA) was a guerrilla movement in Lesotho, formed in the mid-1970s and connected to the anti-Apartheid Azanian People's Liberation Army (APLA). It was the armed wing of the Basutoland Congress Party (BCP), a pan-Africanist and left-wing political party founded in 1952, which opposed the regime of Prime Minister Leabua Jonathan.

== History ==
BCP insurgency
| Date | 1974 - 1990 |
| Location | Lesotho |
| Result | Stalemate: the BCP wins elections in 1993 |

Belligerents
| Government of Lesotho | Basutoland Congress Party: Lesotho Liberation Army |

Commanders and leaders
| (Lesotho) King Moshoeshoe II (1974-1990) (Lesotho) Leabua Jonathan (1979-1986); Justin Lekhanya | Potlako Leballo; Ntsu Mokhehle |

The BCP won the first free elections in 1970, but the ruling Basutoland National Party declared a state of emergency, annulling the election, dissolving parliament and suspending the constitution. The BCP launched a failed uprising in the government in 1974, which caused Ntsu Mokhehle to go into exile, from which he led the "external" faction of the BCP and the new armed wing, the Lesotho Liberation Army. The new guerrilla movement was closely connected to the Pan-Africanist Congress (PAC), a South African militant opposition group. Potlako Leballo, a co-founder of the BCP back in 1952, was a prominent leader to the PAC and its armed wing, and largely responsible for its turn towards Maoism.

In 1976, the Azanian People's Liberation Army received 178 Basotho migrant miners as recruits, who would form the basis of the Lesotho Liberation Army (LLA). They were trained in Libya, where the government of Muammar Gaddafi provided training to the APLA. These recruits were put under the leadership of Matooane Mapefane, who was a senior instructor of the APLA in Libya. The movement was deeply fractured from the start, with factional infighting among the recruits and a lack of discipline.

The first LLA attacks began in May 1979, with a bombing targeting the country's main post office. In 1979 Mokhehle claimed to, in addition to the Libyan-trained troops, possess 500–1000 guerrillas based in the deep mountains of Lesotho. Fighting with the government was intense in 1979–1980, and terrorist attacks by the LLA were frequent over the next few years, with incidents such as the laying of land mines, bombings, mortar attacks, and drive-by shootings. Targets included the Leribe Airport, the Hilton Hotel, policemen, politicians, petroleum and electricity infrastructure, a United States cultural center, and the West German ambassador's car.

Prime Minister Jonathan, previously a close ally of the Apartheid government in South Africa, gradually started straying from its fold, eventually going as far as aiding the African National Congress. In response, P. W. Botha is said to have funded the LLA, despite the massive ideological differences, and allowed the guerrillas to pass through South African territory. Despite this association, the connection to the Pan-Africanist Congress wasn't cut. A brother of the leading ANC member Thabo Mbeki, Jama (who was involved with the PAC), was killed in Lesotho in 1982 while attempting to assist the LLA. After increased conflict between Lesotho and South Africa, Jonathan was overthrown in a military coup led by Justin Lekhanya, who is alleged to have accidentally funded the LLA after being subjected to a scam.

Ntsu Mokhehle was allowed to return to Lesotho in the early 1990s for peace talks, and the Lesotho Liberation Army was disbanded after the reunification of the Basutoland Congress Party's different factions. The party subsequently won the 1993 general elections, and Mokhehle became prime minister.
