= Kelebone Maope =

Mosotho politician

- Born: 1945 (age 80–81)

Kelebone Albert Maope (born 1945) is a Lesotho politician who served in the Basutoland Congress Party (BCP) and Lesotho Congress for Democracy (LCD) governments during the 1990s before splitting from the LCD in 2001 to form his own party, the Lesotho People's Congress (LPC).

== Political career ==
As a member of the BCP, Maope served as Attorney General and Minister of Justice under the military regime that ruled Lesotho from 1986 to 1993. He was also Minister of Justice in the BCP government that took office in 1993. On April 14, 1994, he was briefly kidnapped along with three other ministers by soldiers; a fifth minister, Deputy Prime Minister Selometsi Baholo, was killed in this incident.

Maope served as Minister of Justice until he was named Minister of Foreign Affairs in a cabinet reshuffle on July 20, 1995. On February 21, 1998 he was elected Deputy Leader of the new ruling party, the LCD, which had been formed in 1997. He remained in this position until June 1998, when he was appointed Deputy Prime Minister and Minister of Agriculture and Land Reclamation. On July 22, 1999, he became Minister of Finance and Development Planning, while remaining Deputy Prime Minister.

In early 2001, Maope was re-elected as Deputy Leader of the LCD without opposition. In July 2001, he was moved from his position as Minister of Finance to that of Minister of Justice and Constitutional Affairs, remaining Deputy Prime Minister.

In September 2001, tensions within the LCD were reflected in a statement by Maope, a member of the party's Lesiba faction, alleging that the government was oppressive. Foreign Minister Tom Thabane then publicly insulted Maope. On September 28, Maope resigned from the government, and he formed a new party, the Lesotho People's Congress (LPC), which was registered on October 8. The LPC, with Maope as its leader, gained 27 members of parliament through defections from the LCD.

In the May 2002 parliamentary election, Maope won a seat in the Seqonoka constituency; he was the only LPC candidate to win a constituency, although the party gained four other seats through proportional representation.
