= 1985 Lesotho general election =

- 17-18 September 1985

60 seats in the National Assembly 31 seats needed for a majority
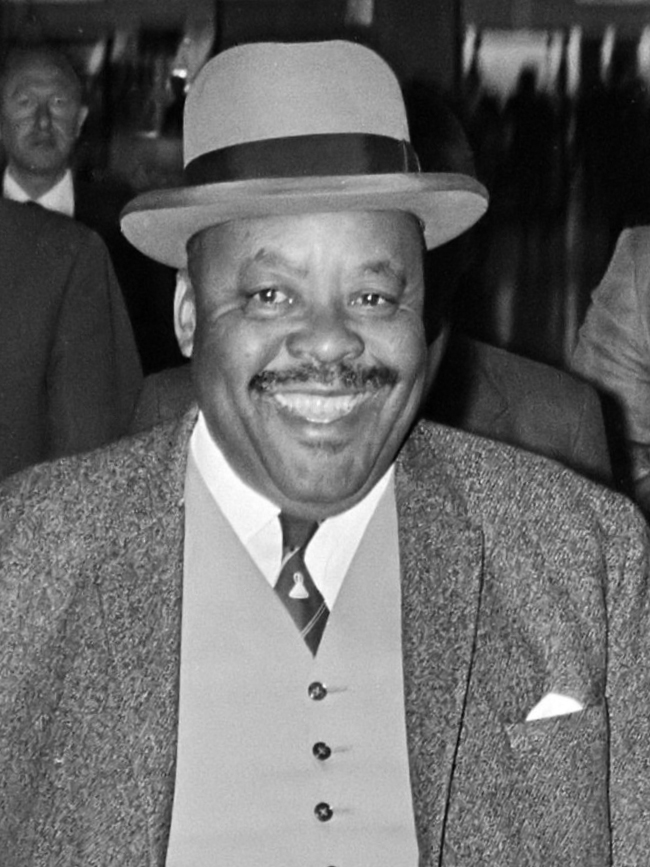
| | Majority party |
|---|---|
| Leader | Leabua Jonathan |
| Party | BNP |
| Seats won | 60 |
| Popular vote | Uncontested |
Prime Minister before election
Leabua Jonathan
BNP
Elected Prime Minister
Leabua Jonathan
BNP

General elections were due to be held in Lesotho оn 17–18 September 1985, the first since 1970, when the ruling Basotholand National Party carried out a coup d'état by declaring a state of emergency after annulling the election, which they had lost to the Basutoland Congress Party. However, the election was boycotted by all parties except for the BNP, which won all 60 seats by default in a non-competitive election.
