= List of prime ministers of Lesotho =

Prime Minister of Lesotho
- Tona-Kholo
- Coat of arms of Lesotho

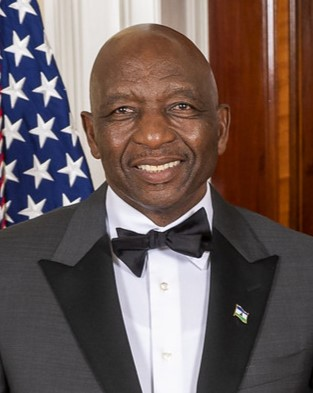
- Incumbent; Sam Matekane since 28 October 2022
- Style: The Right Honorable
- Member of: Cabinet
- Reports to: King of Lesotho
- Residence: State House, Maseru
- Appointer: Letsie III, as King of Lesotho
- Term length: 5 years, renewable
- Inaugural holder: Sekhonyana Nehemia Maseribane
- Formation: 6 May 1965; 61 years ago
- Salary: L562,734 / US$36,650 annually

This is a list of prime ministers of Lesotho (Sotho: Tona-Kholo) since the formation of the post of Prime Minister of Lesotho in 1965, to the present day.

A total of seven people have served as Prime Minister of Lesotho (not counting one acting prime minister and two chairmen of the Military Council). Additionally, three persons, Ntsu Mokhehle, Pakalitha Mosisili and Tom Thabane, have served on two non-consecutive occasions.

The current prime minister is Sam Matekane, who was sworn in on 28 October 2022.

== List of officeholders ==
Political parties

Basotho National Party (BNP)
Basutoland Congress Party (BCP)
Lesotho Congress for Democracy (LCD)
Democratic Congress (DC)
All Basotho Convention (ABC)
Revolution for Prosperity (RFP)

Other factions

Military
Independent

Status

Chairman of the Military Council
Acting prime minister

No.	Portrait	Name (Birth–Death)	Election	Term of office			Political party	Monarch(s) (Reign)
No.	Portrait	Name (Birth–Death)	Election	Took office	Left office	Time in office	Political party	Monarch(s) (Reign)
1		Sekhonyana Nehemia Maseribane (1918–1986)	1965	6 May 1965	7 July 1965	62 days	BNP	Elizabeth II (1965–1966)
2		Leabua Jonathan (1914–1987)	1970 (annulled); 1985	7 July 1965	20 January 1986 (deposed)	20 years, 197 days	BNP	Moshoeshoe II (1966–1990)
—		Justin Metsing Lekhanya (1938–2021)	—	24 January 1986	2 May 1991 (deposed)	5 years, 98 days	Military	Moshoeshoe II (1966–1990)
—		Justin Metsing Lekhanya (1938–2021)	—	24 January 1986	2 May 1991 (deposed)	5 years, 98 days	Military	Letsie III (1990–1995)
—		Elias Phisoana Ramaema (1933–2015)	—	2 May 1991	2 April 1993	1 year, 335 days	Military	Letsie III (1990–1995)
3		Ntsu Mokhehle (1918–1999)	1993	2 April 1993	17 August 1994 (deposed)	1 year, 137 days	BCP	Letsie III (1990–1995)
—		Hae Phoofolo (1947–2025)	—	17 August 1994	14 September 1994	28 days	Independent	Letsie III (1990–1995)
		Ntsu Mokhehle (1918–1999)	—	14 September 1994	29 May 1998	3 years, 257 days	BCP (until 1997)	Letsie III (1990–1995)
(3)		Ntsu Mokhehle (1918–1999)	—	14 September 1994	29 May 1998	3 years, 257 days	BCP (until 1997)	Moshoeshoe II (1995–1996)
		Ntsu Mokhehle (1918–1999)	—	14 September 1994	29 May 1998	3 years, 257 days	BCP (until 1997)	Letsie III (since 1996)
		Ntsu Mokhehle (1918–1999)	—	14 September 1994	29 May 1998	3 years, 257 days	LCD	Letsie III (since 1996)
4		Pakalitha Mosisili (born 1945)	1998; 2002; 2007	29 May 1998	8 June 2012	14 years, 10 days	LCD (until 2011)	Letsie III (since 1996)
		Pakalitha Mosisili (born 1945)	1998; 2002; 2007	29 May 1998	8 June 2012	14 years, 10 days	DC	Letsie III (since 1996)
5		Tom Thabane (born 1939)	2012	8 June 2012	17 March 2015	2 years, 282 days	ABC	Letsie III (since 1996)
(4)		Pakalitha Mosisili (born 1945)	2015	17 March 2015	16 June 2017	2 years, 91 days	DC	Letsie III (since 1996)
(5)		Tom Thabane (born 1939)	2017	16 June 2017	19 May 2020	2 years, 339 days	ABC	Letsie III (since 1996)
6		Moeketsi Majoro (born 1961)	—	20 May 2020	28 October 2022	2 years, 161 days	ABC	Letsie III (since 1996)
7		Sam Matekane (born 1958)	2022	28 October 2022	Incumbent	3 years, 314 days	RFP	Letsie III (since 1996)

== See also ==
- Politics of Lesotho
- History of Lesotho
- Monarchy of Lesotho
