= National Progressive Party (Lesotho) =

Political party in Lesotho

The National Progressive Party was a political party in Lesotho led by Peete Nkoebe Peete.

== History ==
The party was established in 1995 when Peete Nkoebe Peete, the deputy leader of the Basotho National Party (BNP), left the BNP following a dispute over the party's boycott of by-elections. In the 1998 general elections it received 0.5% of the vote, failing to win a seat. In the 2002 general elections the party increased its vote share to 0.7% and won one seat.

The party did not contest the 2007 general elections.
