= 1970 Lesotho coup d'état =

Self-coup of Leabua Jonathan

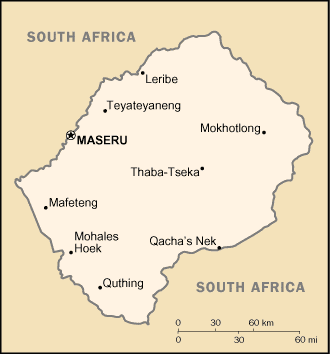
- A CIA WFB map of Lesotho
- Date: 30 January 1970
- Location: (Lesotho) Maseru
- Type: Self-coup
- Cause: Electoral defeat of the ruling BNP in the general election
- Motive: Annulment of the general election
- Organised by: Leabua Jonathan
- Participants: Government of Lesotho
- Outcome: Coup succeeds: Prime Minister Jonathan declared a state of emergency, annulled the general election, dissolved parliament and suspended the constitution.; King Moshoeshoe II temporarily exiled from 5 June to 5 December 1970, with Queen 'Mamohato serving as Regent.

The 1970 Lesotho coup d'état was a self-coup that took place in Lesotho on 30 January 1970, led by Prime Minister Leabua Jonathan. It led to the assumption of dictatorial powers by Prime Minister Jonathan, who held the office since 1965. The coup was triggered by the victory of the opposition Basutoland Congress Party (BCP, led by Ntsu Mokhehle) over the ruling Basotholand National Party (BNP, led by Jonathan) in the general election.

Prime Minister Jonathan declared a state of emergency, annulled the election, dissolved parliament and suspended the constitution. King Moshoeshoe II was sent into exile after expressing disapproval of the actions. Jonathan himself was deposed in the 1986 coup d'état, led by General Justin Lekhanya.
