= 1970 Lesotho general election =

- 27-28 January 1970

60 seats in the National Assembly 31 seats needed for a majority
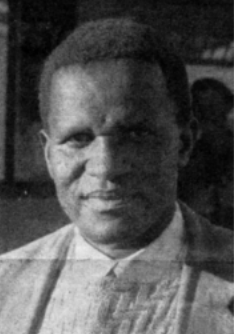

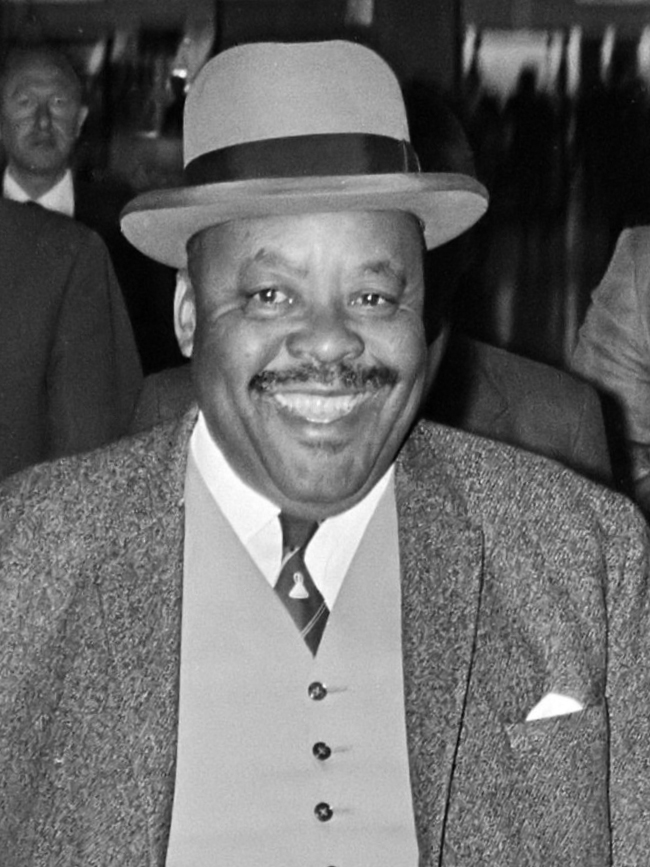

	Majority party	Minority party	Third party
Leader	Ntsu Mokhehle	Leabua Jonathan	Seth Makotoko
Party	BCP	BNP	MFP
Last election	40.04%, 25 seats	42.01%, 31 seats	15.70%, 4 seats
Seats won	36	23	1
Seat change	▲11	▼8	▼3
Popular vote	152,907	129,434	22,279
Percentage	49.88%	42.23%	7.27%
Swing	▲9.84pp	▲0.22pp	▼8.43pp
Prime Minister before election
Leabua Jonathan
BNP
Elected Prime Minister
Coup d'état

General elections were held in Lesotho on 27 and 28 January 1970, the first since independence in 1966. They were won by the opposition Basutoland Congress Party. However, without announcing the results, the ruling Basotho National Party carried out a coup d'état by declaring a state of emergency, annulling the election, dissolving parliament and suspending the constitution. King Moshoeshoe II was sent into exile after expressing disapproval of the actions.

Leabua Jonathan then ruled the country as a dictator until 1986 when a military coup d'état led by Major General Justin Lekhanya deposed him. Lesotho did not return to democratic rule until the 1993 elections, which were again won by the BCP in a landslide victory.

== Results ==
Official results were never published, but figures were made available by election observers.

Party	Votes	%	Seats	+/–
Basutoland Congress Party	152,907	49.88	36	+11
Basotho National Party	129,434	42.23	23	–8
Marematlou Freedom Party	22,279	7.27	1	–3
United Democratic Party	345	0.11	0	New
Communist Party of Lesotho	68	0.02	0	0
Independents	1,496	0.49	0	0
Total	306,529	100.00	60	0
Source: Macartney
