= Pakalitha Mosisili =

Prime Minister of Lesotho, 1998–2012 and 2015–2017

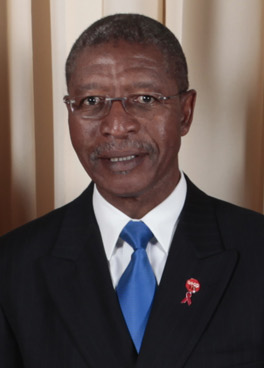
- Mosisili in 2009

3rd Prime Minister of Lesotho
- In office 17 March 2015 – 16 June 2017
- Monarch: Letsie III
- Preceded by: Tom Thabane
- Succeeded by: Tom Thabane
- In office 29 May 1998 – 8 June 2012
- Monarch: Letsie III
- Preceded by: Ntsu Mokhehle
- Succeeded by: Tom Thabane

Personal details
- Born: 14 March 1945 (age 80); Waterfall, Basutoland (now Lesotho)
- Political party: Basotho Congress Party (1967–1997); Congress for Democracy (1997–2012); Democratic Congress (2012–2019)
- Spouse: Mathato Mosisili
- Children: maile mosisili
- Education: University of Botswana, Lesotho and Swaziland (BA); University of Wisconsin, Madison (MA); University of South Africa (BA); Simon Fraser University (MEd)

Bethuel Pakalitha Mosisili (born 14 March 1945) is a former Mosotho politician who was the fourth prime minister of Lesotho from May 1998 to June 2012 and again from March 2015 to June 2017. He led the Lesotho Congress for Democracy (LCD) to a near-total victory in the 1998 election, and under his leadership the party also won majorities in the 2002 and 2007 elections. While serving as Prime Minister, Mosisili was also Minister of Defence.

Following the snap election held on 28 February 2015, he formed and led a coalition government. He was sworn in on 17 March 2015.

== Early life and career ==
Mosisili was born at Waterfall in Qacha's Nek on March 14, 1945. He was educated at the Eagle's Peak High School, where he attained his Cambridge Overseas School Certificate in 1965. He did his primary schooling at Tebellong, Souru and Tsoelike and then pursued his higher education at the University of Botswana, Lesotho and Swaziland and graduated with a BA in Education. Upon graduation in July 1970, he was imprisoned because of his political activism and was released the next year in November. He was a member of the Basotho Congress Party.

In 1976, he attained his MA from the University of Wisconsin in the United States and then completed a BA honours program via distance education from the University of South Africa. In 1982, he graduated from Simon Fraser University in Canada with a Master of Education degree.

== Political career ==
In 1993, Mosisili was elected to parliament from the Qacha's Nek Constituency and became Minister of Education. On April 14, 1994, he was briefly kidnapped along with three other ministers by soldiers; a fifth minister, Deputy Prime Minister Selometsi Baholo, was killed in this incident. Mosisili was appointed Deputy Prime Minister in late January 1995, while remaining Minister of Education; on July 20, 1995, he was named Minister of Home Affairs and Local Government instead, while remaining Deputy Prime Minister. A new ruling party, the LCD, was formed in 1997 under the leadership of Prime Minister Ntsu Mokhehle as a split from the Basutoland Congress Party. On February 21, 1998, Mosisili was elected leader of the LCD after Mokhehle chose to step down due to poor health.

After his party's victory in 1998 there were accusations of vote rigging and mass protests from the opposition parties, which culminated with their occupation of the grounds to the palace. In the ensuing debacle which saw the army, police and king complicit in an attempt to unseat his government, Mosisili had to resort to asking the regional grouping, Southern African Development Community (SADC), for an intervention to stem the imminent coup. To this end, joint force, consisting of South African and (later) Botswana troops, entered Lesotho on September 22, 1998, to put down the mutiny and restore the democratically elected government.

New elections were eventually held in May 2002, which his party won, this after a major split led by his former deputy, Kelebone Maope, and Shakhane Mokhehle, the brother of the late founder of his party. On this occasion, Mosisili himself was elected to a seat from the Tsoelike constituency, receiving 79.2% of the vote; in his previous constituency, Qacha's Nek, Pontso Sekatle was the LCD candidate.

In October 2006, Tom Thabane left the LCD and formed a new party, the All Basotho Convention (ABC), and 17 other members of parliament joined him; this left the LCD with a narrow majority of 61 out of 120 seats. On Mosisili's advice, King Letsie III dissolved parliament on November 24, 2006, and a new election was scheduled for February 17, 2007; they had previously been expected in April or May. The LCD won this election, taking 61 seats; the National Independent Party, allied with the LCD, won an additional 21 seats.

Whilst attending a funeral in his home district of Qacha's Nek in late 2006, Mosisili gave a speech which quoted a Basotho idiom, "Se sa feleng sea hlola", meaning "anything that does not finish/end is not good". Some believed that he was referring to his term in office and his embattled political party.

Armed men attacked Mosisili's residence on April 22, 2009, apparently intending to kill him; three of the attackers, one of whom was reportedly a soldier, were killed by police, and Mosisili was unharmed. Six people appeared before a South African court in July 2009 on charges of helping in the attempt. The Lesotho Communications Minister described the attack as a plot by South African and Mozambican mercenaries to stage a coup in Lesotho.

Following the snap election held on 28 February 2015, he managed to form and lead a coalition government. Two years later, on 1 March 2017, he was defeated in a parliamentary vote of confidence, and an early election was expected to be held, although the opposition wanted Mosisili to step aside and allow Monyane Moleleki, Mosisili's former deputy turned rival, to take over. Mosisili then advised King Letsie III to dissolve Parliament, and the King did so on 7 March, despite an opposition effort to obstruct the move.

The election was held on 3 June 2017 and resulted in a victory for Tom Thabane and his party, the ABC, which won 48 seats against 30 for Mosisili's Democratic Congress. A government statement on 8 June said that Mosisili had submitted his resignation to King Letsie but would continue in a caretaker capacity. Thabane succeeded Mosisili as Prime Minister on 16 June.

In November 2018, Mosisili announced his retirement from politics. The Democratic Congress held its elective conference in January 2019 and Mathibeli Mokhothu was elected as his successor. Mokhothu had served as a government minister in Mosisili's last cabinet.

== Personal life ==
He is married to Mathato Mosisili.

== See also ==
- South African intervention in Lesotho
- Politics of Lesotho

Political offices
Preceded by Ntsu Mokhehle	Prime Minister of Lesotho; 1998–2012	Succeeded by Tom Thabane
Preceded by Tom Thabane	Prime Minister of Lesotho; 2015–2017	Succeeded by Tom Thabane
