= Mophato Monyake =

Mosotho politician (1961–2024)

Mophato Moshoete Monyake (born 29 April 1961-19 January 2024) was a Lesotho politician with the All Basotho Convention. He was elected Member of Parliament for the Stadium Area in the May 2012 elections. Prime Minister Thomas Thabane named him Minister of Justice the following month.
