= 'Makabelo Mosothoane =

Mosotho politician

Makabelo Priscilla Mosothoane

Minister for Education and Training
- In office 2012–2015

Personal details
- Born: 1952 (age 73–74) Kanye, Botswana
- Party: All Basotho Convention

'Makabelo Priscilla Mosothoane (born 1952) is a Lesotho politician who served as the country's Minister for Education and Training from 2012 to 2015, in the government of Tom Thabane. She worked as a nurse and schoolteacher prior to entering politics, and was also president of the local branch of the Red Cross Society.

== Early life ==
Mosothoane was born in Kanye, Botswana, into a Tswana family. Her native language was Setswana. Mosothoane attended secondary school in Gaborone (Botswana's capital), and subsequently completed a diploma in nursing, interning at Gaborone's Princess Marina Hospital. She moved to Lesotho to study at the National University of Lesotho, graduating in 1982 with a Bachelor of Arts in Education. Remaining in Lesotho after graduation, Mosothoane initially worked as a high school teacher, teaching at schools in Linare and Hlotse. In 1987, she began working at the English-medium school for the Leribe District, where she became principal in 1991. Outside of her work in education, Mosothoane was elected president of the Lesotho Red Cross Society in 2003.

== Politics ==
At the 2012 Lesotho general election, Mosothoane was elected to the National Assembly as a Lesotho Congress for Democracy (LCD) candidate, winning the Hlotse constituency. She defeated Lineo Molise, a sitting deputy minister. After the election, Mosothoane was made Minister for Education and Training in the coalition government formed by Prime Minister Tom Thabane of the All Basotho Convention (ABC). During her period as education minister, she introduced a new nationwide curriculum for primary schools, and also oversaw the localisation of secondary school examinations, which had previously been administered by Cambridge International Examinations (a British organisation).

In October 2014, Mosothoane was also appointed Minister for Communications, Science and Technology in an acting capacity, following the dismissal of Selibe Mochoboroane from the ministry. Mochoboroane claimed his removal was unlawful, and refused to vacate his office or give up his other ministerial resources. Mosothoane was replaced as acting minister by Joang Molapo in February 2015, at which point Mochoboroane was still disputing the legitimacy of his dismissal. Despite being a sitting minister, she was defeated in an LCD primary election prior to the 2015 general election, and consequently did not retain her seat in the National Assembly.

== See also ==
- Politics of Lesotho
