= 1998 Lesotho general election =

- 24 May 1998

80 seats in the National Assembly 41 seats needed for a majority
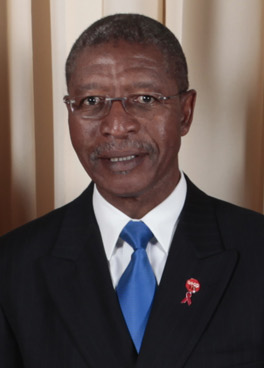

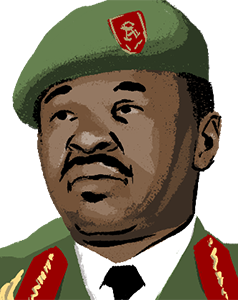
	Majority party	Minority party
Leader	Pakalitha Mosisili	Justin Lekhanya
Party	LCD	BNP
Last election	New	22.66%, 0 seats
Seats won	79	1
Seat change	New	▲1
Popular vote	359,764	145,210
Percentage	60.57%	24.45%
Swing	New	▲1.79pp
Prime Minister before election
Ntsu Mokhehle
LCD
Elected Prime Minister
Pakalitha Mosisili
LCD

General elections were held in Lesotho on 24 May 1998, except in the Moyeni constituency, where voting was postponed until 1 August due to the death of one of the candidates. The result was a comprehensive victory for the new Lesotho Congress for Democracy, which claimed 79 of the 80 seats. The party was formed after its leader broke away from the Basutoland Congress Party, which had won the 1993 elections.

Of the 1,017,753 registered voters, there were 593,955 valid votes.

Due to the unrepresentative representation in seats, with the second placed party only having a single seat, widespread protests and rioting broke out, with arson, violence, and looting, which led to the government sending a plea for military assistance to the Southern African Development Community. Led by South Africa, Operation Boleas, an "intervention to restore democracy and the rule of law" was launched, which took place from 22 September 1998 – 15 May 1999 (8 months).

== Results ==
Party	Votes	%	Seats	+/–
Lesotho Congress for Democracy	359,764	60.57	79	New
Basotho National Party	145,210	24.45	1	+1
Basutoland Congress Party	62,313	10.49	0	–65
Marematlou Freedom Party	7,546	1.27	0	0
Sefate Democratic Union	3,160	0.53	0	New
Popular Front for Democracy	3,077	0.52	0	0
National Progressive Party	2,897	0.49	0	New
National Independent Party	1,644	0.28	0	0
Congress for Democracy Party	1,185	0.20	0	New
United Democratic Party	357	0.06	0	0
Kopanang Basotho Party	174	0.03	0	0
Lesotho Education Party	92	0.02	0	0
Independents	6,536	1.10	0	0
Total	593,955	100.00	80	+15
Registered voters/turnout	1,017,753	–		
Source: Nohlen et al.
