= 1960 Basutoland general election =

General elections were held in Basutoland in 1960 after a new Constitution was approved by the British authorities in September 1959. The public elected nine District Councils with a total of 162 members on 20 January. The District Councils subsequently elected 40 members of the National Council, with a further 14 members nominated by Moshoeshoe II, 22 members drawn from principal and ward chiefs and four members from among senior government officials.

Voter turnout was very low, with just 35,000 of the 191,000 registered voters taking part in the election. The new National Council was opened on 12 March.

== Results ==
=== District Councils ===
Party	Votes	%	Seats
Basutoland Congress Party	12,787	36.22	73
Basutoland National Party	7,002	19.83	22
Marema-Tlou Party	2,812	7.97	16
Basutoland Progressive Association	231	0.65	0
Independents	12,470	35.32	51
Total	35,302	100.00	162
Source: Sternberger et al.

=== National Council ===
Party	Seats
Basutoland Congress Party	30
Marema-Tlou Party	5
Basutoland National Party	1
Independents	4
Appointed members	40
Total	80
Source: African Elections Database
