= Sekhonyana Nehemia Maseribane =

Prime Minister of Basutoland

Chief Sekhonyana Maseribane

1st Prime Minister of Basutoland
- In office 6 May 1965 – 7 July 1965
- Monarch: Elizabeth II
- Preceded by: None (position created)
- Succeeded by: Leabua Jonathan

Personal details
- Born: 4 May 1918 Mount Moorosi, Basutoland
- Died: 3 November 1986 (aged 68)
- Party: Basotho National Party

Chief Sekhonyana Nehemia Maseribane (4 May 1918 – 3 November 1986) served as the first prime minister of Basutoland (now Lesotho) from 6 May 1965 to 7 July 1965.

Preceded by Position created	Prime Minister of Basutoland; 1965	Succeeded by Leabua Jonathan
