= National Independent Party =

Political party in Lesotho

- Founded: 1984/1985
- Split from: Basotho National Party
- Ideology: Conservatism; Anti-communism; Republicanism
- Political position: Centre-right to right-wing
- National Assembly: 0 / 120

The National Independent Party is a political party in Lesotho.

The NIP was founded by Anthony Manyeli as a split from the Basotho National Party. It performed poorly in the 1993 and 1998 parliamentary elections, but in the election for the National Assembly held on 25 May 2002, the party won 5.5% of popular votes and five out of 120 seats. The party had previously never won any seats, and its success in winning five seats through proportional representation in the 2002 election was attributed to voter confusion about party symbols: its symbol being that of the dove and the symbol of the ruling Lesotho Congress for Democracy (LCD) being that of the eagle. NIP party leader Manyeli, expressing surprise at the results, said that this explanation was the only way he could account for them.

In the 17 February 2007 parliamentary election, the party won 21 seats through proportional representation. It is allied with the LCD. Manyeli contested this alliance and won a court ruling against the alliance, but it was then overturned on appeal. He was excluded from the party's list of candidates and therefore did not get a seat in parliament. Opposition parties trying to have the alliance ruled invalid have said that the appeal ruling was in violation of the constitution; they sought for the NIP members of parliament to be replaced by Manyeli and his supporters.

== Election results ==
Election	Votes	Share	Seats	+/-	Government
1993	241	0.05	0 / 120	New	Extra-parliamentary
1998	1,644	0.28	0 / 120	0	Extra-parliamentary
2002	30,346	5.47	5 / 120	▲5	Opposition
2007			21 / 120	▲16	Opposition
2012	6,880	1.25	2 / 120	▼19	Opposition
2015	5,404	0.95	1 / 120	▼1	Opposition
2017	6,375	1.10	1 / 120	0	Opposition
2022	3,703	0.72	1 / 120	0	Opposition
