= South African intervention in Lesotho =

1998–1999 military operation

SADC intervention in Lesotho
Date	22 September 1998 (8 months)
Location	Lesotho

Belligerents
Government of Lesotho: Lesotho Congress for Democracy; SADC: South Africa; Botswana	Lesotho opposition: Basotho National Party

Commanders and leaders
Pakalitha Mosisili (South Africa) Nelson Mandela (South Africa) Mangosuthu Buthelezi (Botswana) Festus Mogae	

Units involved
Pro-government faction of the Lesotho Defence Force; South African National Defence Force; Botswana Defence Force	Pro-opposition faction of the Lesotho Defence Force

Strength
1,820 (South Africa) 600 soldiers	2,000+ rebellious soldiers

Casualties and losses
South Africa: 11 killed, 17+ wounded	134

The South African intervention in Lesotho, codenamed Operation Boleas, was a military invasion launched by the Southern African Development Community (SADC), and led by South Africa through its South African National Defence Force into Lesotho to quell unrest after the 1998 elections.

== Prelude ==
In May 1998, parliamentary elections in Lesotho resulted in an overwhelming majority for the ruling Lesotho Congress for Democracy (LCD) Party, which won 79 out of 80 seats. The main opposition party, the Basotho National Party, won the remaining 1 seat, yet with a 24% share of voters. Allegations of vote fraud soon surfaced, and after a failed lawsuit by the opposition parties, widespread rioting broke out. In addition the new government lacked support in key areas of the military, police and civil service, facing rebellion in the army. Under President Nelson Mandela the ANC-led government in South Africa (which completely landlocks Lesotho) announced it would create a SADC commission to determine the allegations of corruption. Led by South African judge, Pius Langa, the commission's report stated there was no evidence of electoral malpractice or fraud.

== Intervention ==
In light of the rising crisis and lack of support from elements of the state, the de jure ruling party, the LCD, sent a plea for military assistance to South Africa and Botswana. At the time of the intervention, both Mandela and Deputy President Thabo Mbeki were out of South Africa, with Home Affairs Minister Mangosuthu Buthelezi serving as acting president. Mandela approved the deployment of the South African National Defence Force (SANDF) to Lesotho on 22 September 1998 to quell the rioting and maintain order. Botswana Defence Force soldiers were also deployed. The operation was described as an "intervention to restore democracy and the rule of law". The SANDF contingent included a squadron of Ratel-90 and Rooikat armoured fighting vehicles seconded from 1 Special Service Battalion.

Widespread arson, violence, and looting occurred despite the presence of SADC soldiers. The central business district of the capital, Maseru, was burned down by opposition supporters. The heavily damaged city required a period of several years of rebuilding.

== International reactions ==
South Africa was accused in some quarters of using its military and diplomatic superiority as a regional hegemon to dominate and meddle in the internal affairs of a smaller nation to further its own strategic interests, in particular the water supply to its economic hub, Gauteng Province. South Africa is the largest economic and military power in the SADC. Despite this, many influential powers such as the United Kingdom, United States of America and the European Union supported the SADC intervention in Lesotho as an "appropriate assumption of regional responsibility".

== Aftermath ==
In November 1998 the opposition parties accepted an agreement where the LCD government would be restored to power in return for the establishment of the Independent Political Authority (IPA). The IPA was constituted of 2 members of each of the 12 parties that participated in the 1998 election and was tasked with reforming Lesotho's electoral system with new elections planned for 1999. During this time it was also agreed that SADC forces would remain in Lesotho until the Lesotho Defence Force was able to carry out their constitutional duties. The last South African troops were pulled out in May 1999 after seven months of occupation. The LCD and IPA after significant negotiation reached an agreement on electoral reform in December 1999, thus the elections had to be postponed. A Mixed Member Proportional (MMP) electoral system was introduced in Lesotho seeking to amend the distortions in representation caused by the prior plurality system, with elections to be held at the latest in May 2001. However, further disagreements between the government and IPA, and administrative issues led to the elections being again postponed until 2002. This MMP system saw success in the 2002 election, with the Lesotho Congress for Democracy winning 77 of the 120 seats and the opposition parties accepting these results.

== See also ==
- Politics of Lesotho
