= Communist Party of Lesotho =

Political party in Lesotho

- Leader: Mokhafisi Kena
- Founded: 5 May 1962
- Headquarters: Maseru
- Ideology: Communism; Marxism-Leninism; Republicanism
- Political position: Far-left

The Communist Party of Lesotho (Mokhatlo oa Makomonisi a Lesotho) is a Marxist-Leninist party in Lesotho, founded on May 5, 1962. The founding secretary of the party was John Motloheloa. Other early leaders of the party included Mokhafisi Kena and Sefali Malefane. Joe Matthews of the South African Communist Party (founded 1953) financed the launch of the Lesotho party but later supported the ANC-allied Marematlou Freedom Party. The South African Communist Party, the Hungarian Socialist Workers' Party and Walter Ulbricht of the Socialist Unity Party of Germany sent greetings on the occasion of the founding of the party. The party began publishing Mosebetsi.

During the 1960s, the party split into Soviet-allied (Kena, Malefane, Mtji, and Ms Hoohlo) and Chinese-allied (Motloholoa, T. Leanya, and T. Nqojane) factions. In the 1970 election, its two Moscow-allied candidates at Thaba Chitja (Kena) and Tsoelike (Malefane) received 25 and 18 votes respectively. The party was officially banned in February 1970, but went underground and continued its activities. After the 1986 coup, its leader, Sefali Malefane, a university lecturer in Economics, was made a minister in Major-General Justin Lekhanya's regime. The party was made legal again in 1991.

After the fall of apartheid rule in neighbouring South Africa, the party advocated union with South Africa.

The party ceased the publication of its newspaper, Mafube, in 1997.

The party's current leader is Manny Stevenson.
