= Lesotho Workers' Party =

Political party in Lesotho

The Lesotho Workers' Party is a political party in Lesotho. In the 25 May 2002 parliamentary election, the party won 1.4% of popular votes and one out of 120 seats in the National Assembly. In the 17 February 2007 parliamentary election, the party won 10 seats through proportional representation. It is allied with the All Basotho Convention.
