= Basotho Batho Democratic Party =

Political party in Lesotho

The Basotho Batho Democratic Party (BBDP) is a political party in Lesotho. It was formed and registered in 2006.

In elections held on 17 February 2007, the party won one seat in the National Assembly.
