= Marematlou Freedom Party =

Political party in Lesotho

- Leader: Moeketse Malebo
- Founded: 1962
- Ideology: Conservatism; Royalism
- National Assembly: 0 / 120

The Marematlou Freedom Party (MFP) is a royalist political party in Lesotho.

== History ==
The party was established in December 1962 by a merger of the Freedom Party and the Marema-Tlou Party (MTP). Soon after its formation several members of the Basutoland Congress Party defected to the MFP.

When former MTP leader Seepheephe Matete was replaced as party president by Seth Makotoko he broke away to re-establish the MTP as a separate party. Both contested the 1965 general elections, with the MFP winning four seats with 16.5% of the vote and the MTP no seats with 2.2% of the vote.

In the 1970 general elections the party's vote share fell to 7%, resulting in it being reduced to a single seat.

When multi-party democracy was restored in the 1990s the party contested the 1993 elections, receiving 1.4% of the vote and failing to win a seat. It remained seatless after receiving 1.3% of the vote in the 1998 elections. Despite its vote share falling to 1.2% in the 2002 elections, the party won a seat due to the new proportional electoral system. It retained the single seat in the 2007, 2012 and 2015 elections.

== Electoral Performance ==
Election	Proportional		Constituency		Seats	+/-	Government
Election	Votes	Share	Votes	Share	Seats	+/-	Government
1965	40,414	15.70	—		4 / 60	New	Opposition
1970	22,279	7.27	—		1 / 60	▼3	BNP coup d'état
1985	Did not contest		—		0 / 60	▼1	Extra-parliamentary
1993	7,650	1.44	—		0 / 65	0	Extra-parliamentary
1998	7,546	1.27	—		0 / 89	0	Extra-parliamentary
2002	6,890	1.24	7,723	1.44	1 / 120	▲1	Opposition
2007	9,129	2.06	5,106	1.19	1 / 120	0	Opposition
2012	3,300	0.60	—		1 / 120	0	Coalition
2015	3,413	0.60	—		1 / 120	0	Opposition
2017	2,761	0.47	—		1 / 120	0	Opposition
2022	1,764	0.34	—		0 / 120	▼1	Extra-parliamentary
