= 1993 Lesotho general election =

- 27 March 1993

65 seats in the National Assembly 33 seats needed for a majority
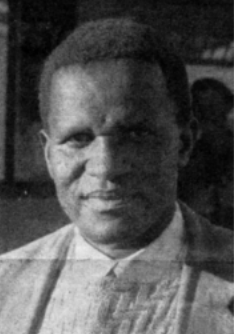
	Majority party
Leader	Ntsu Mokhehle
Party	BCP
Last election	Did not contest
Seats won	65
Seat change	▲65
Popular vote	398,355
Percentage	74.78%
Prime Minister before election
Elias Ramaema
Military regime
Elected Prime Minister
Ntsu Mokhehle
BCP

General elections were held in Lesotho on 27 March 1993, the first full elections since the ruling Basotho National Party annulled the results of the 1970 elections, which they had lost to the Basutoland Congress Party. Of the 736,930 registered voters, 532,678 cast valid votes.

The BCP were victorious in the election, winning all 65 of the seats in the National Assembly. Its leader, Ntsu Mokhehle, became Prime Minister.

== Results ==
Party	Votes	%	Seats
Basutoland Congress Party	398,355	74.78	65
Basotho National Party	120,686	22.66	0
Marematlou Freedom Party	7,650	1.44	0
Popular Front for Democracy	947	0.18	0
Hareeng Basotho Party	646	0.12	0
United Democratic Party	582	0.11	0
Kopanang Basotho Party	417	0.08	0
Lesotho Labour Party	244	0.05	0
National Independent Party	241	0.05	0
Lesotho Education Party	63	0.01	0
United Party	51	0.01	0
Liberal Party of Lesotho	43	0.01	0
Independents	2,753	0.52	0
Total	532,678	100.00	65
Registered voters/turnout	736,930	–	
Source: African Elections Database
