= Hae Phoofolo =

Prime Minister of Lesotho (1947–2025)

Haae Edward Phoofolo (1947–2025) served as interim prime minister of Lesotho from 17 August 1994 to 14 September 1994. Son of an Anglican clergyman, Phoofolo was born in Ladybrand, South Africa. He received his secondary education in 1969 and a joint LLB degree from the University of Botswana, Lesotho and Swaziland and the University of Edinburgh in 1974. He later obtained a M.Sc. degree in banking and money management from Adelphi University, New York in 1977.

In 1974, he was admitted to the Lesotho bar and served as an attorney, conveyancer and notary public in the High Court and Court of Appeal in 1978. He began his public career as a legal advisor to the Lesotho National Development Bank. Three years later, he was appointed commissioner of financial institutions in the Ministry of Finance. In 1981, he participated in the creation of the Lesotho Central Bank and was appointed deputy governor in 1983. Between 1986 and early 2012, he worked as an attorney and served as a consultant, for which he gained a reputation as a human rights advocate. His close relationship with the monarchy led to his appointment as prime minister by King Letsie III in 1994.

In 2012, he battled successfully with the All Basotho Convention for the right to stand as a candidate for election in Maseru Central constituency and won the constituency in 2012 with 45% of votes. He was also appointed Minister of Justice, Human Rights, Correctional Service and Law and Constitutional Affairs and has pledged to improve the country's justice system.

Preceded by Ntsu Mokhehle	Prime Minister of Lesotho; 1994–1994	Succeeded by Ntsu Mokhehle
