= 2002 Lesotho general election =

- 25 May 2002

120 seats in the National Assembly 61 seats needed for a majority
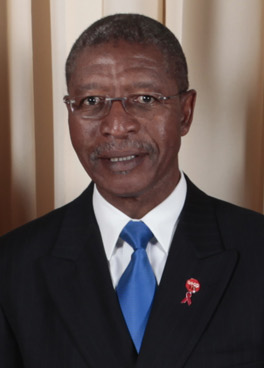

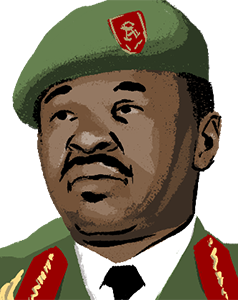
	Majority party	Minority party
Leader	Pakalitha Mosisili	Justin Lekhanya
Party	LCD	BNP
Last election	79 seats	1 seat
Seats won	77	21
Seat change	▼2	▲20
Proportional vote	304,316	124,234
% and swing	54.89% (▼5.68 pp)	22.41% (▼2.04pp)
Constituency vote	309,363	115,085
% and swing	57.64%	21.44%
Prime Minister before election
Ntsu Mokhehle
LCD
Elected Prime Minister
Pakalitha Mosisili
LCD

General elections were held in Lesotho on 25 May 2002. The result was a victory for the Lesotho Congress for Democracy, which received almost 55% of the vote and won 77 of the 120 seats in the National Assembly. It was the first election held in Lesotho under the mixed member proportional representation (MMP) system, with 80 seats elected in first-past-the-post constituencies, and 40 using a proportional representation-based compensatory system. 554,386 of the 831,515 registered voters cast valid votes.

== Results ==
Party	Proportional			Constituency			Total seats	+/–
Party	Votes	%	Seats	Votes	%	Seats	Total seats	+/–
Lesotho Congress for Democracy	304,316	54.89	0	309,363	57.64	77	77	–2
Basotho National Party	124,234	22.41	21	115,085	21.44	0	21	+20
Lesotho People's Congress	32,046	5.78	4	33,502	6.24	1	5	New
National Independent Party	30,346	5.47	5	4,258	0.79	0	5	+5
Basutoland African Congress	16,095	2.90	3	16,737	3.12	0	3	New
Basutoland Congress Party	14,584	2.63	3	12,822	2.39	0	3	+3
Lesotho Workers' Party	7,788	1.40	1	7,706	1.44	0	1	New
Marematlou Freedom Party	6,890	1.24	1	7,723	1.44	0	1	+1
Popular Front for Democracy	6,330	1.14	1	7,180	1.34	0	1	+1
National Progressive Party	3,985	0.72	1	4,047	0.75	0	1	+1
Christian Democratic Party	1,919	0.35	0	1,266	0.24	0	0	New
New Lesotho Freedom Party	1,671	0.30	0	1,753	0.33	0	0	New
Sefate Democratic Union	1,584	0.29	0	1,845	0.34	0	0	0
Kopanang Basotho Party	1,155	0.21	0	179	0.03	0	0	0
United Party	901	0.16	0	208	0.04	0	0	New
Social Democratic Party	542	0.10	0				0	New
Lesotho Labour Party–UDP				994	0.19	0	0	0
Lesotho Education Party				768	0.14	0	0	0
National Democratic Party				389	0.07	0	0	New
Independents				10,870	2.03	0	0	0
Vacant						2	2	–
Total	554,386	100.00	40	536,695	100.00	80	120	+40
Registered voters/turnout	831,515	–						
Source: African Elections Database, EISA, CLEA
