= Selometsi Baholo =

Basotho politician

Selometsi Baholo was the deputy prime minister of Lesotho between 1968 and 1970. He was killed by dissident soldiers on 14 April 1994 in Maseru during an apparent kidnapping attempt.
