= Leabua Jonathan =

Prime Minister of Lesotho from 1965 to 1986

Chief Leabua Jonathan
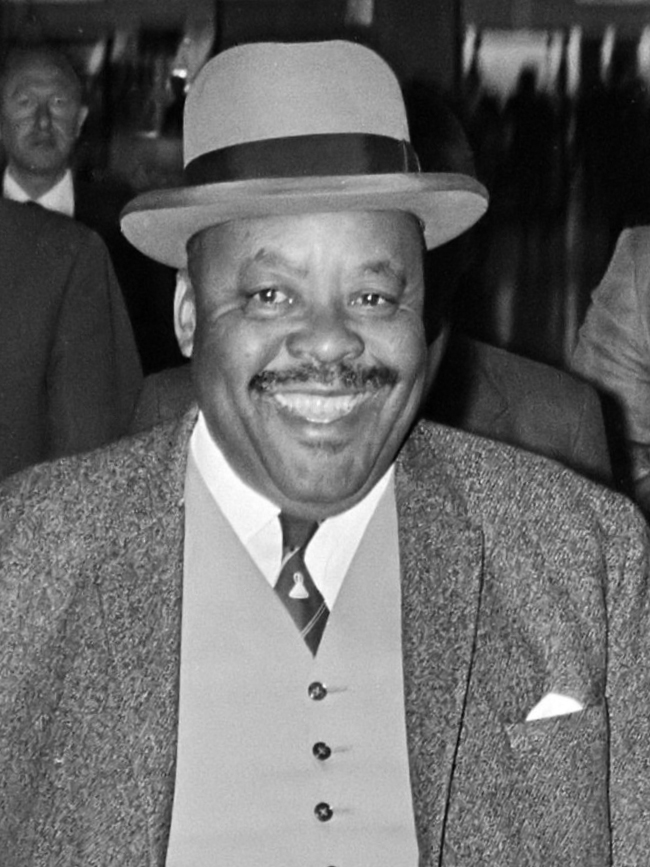
- Prime Minister of Lesotho Jonathan (1970)

1st Prime Minister of Lesotho
- In office 4 October 1966 – 20 January 1986
- Monarch: Moshoeshoe II
- Preceded by: Office established; himself as Prime Minister of Basutoland
- Succeeded by: Justin Metsing Lekhanya; As chairman of the Military Council

2nd Prime Minister of Basutoland
- In office 7 July 1965 – 4 October 1966
- Monarch: Elizabeth II
- Preceded by: Sekhonyana Nehemia Maseribane
- Succeeded by: Office abolished; he himself as the Prime Minister of Lesotho

Personal details
- Born: Joseph Leabua Jonathan; 30 October 1914 Leribe, Basutoland
- Died: 5 April 1987 (aged 72) Pretoria, Transvaal; South Africa
- Party: Basotho National Party

Joseph Leabua Jonathan (30 October 1914 – 5 April 1987) was the first prime minister of Lesotho. He succeeded Chief Sekhonyana Nehemia Maseribane following a by-election and held that post from 1965 to 1986.

== Early life and career ==
Born in Leribe, Jonathan was a minor chief, like many others a great-grandson of the polygamous King Moshoeshoe I.

Jonathan worked as a mine induna at Brakpan but because he was a chief he went back to Rakolo's and got involved in local government in Basutoland from 1937 and was a member of delegations to London that sought self-government in Basutoland.

== Politics and premiership ==
Jonathan converted to Catholicism and in 1959 founded the Canadian Catholic missionary-backed Basutoland National Party (BNP), renamed Basotho National Party at independence. In the 1960 election, barely a year after its formation, Leabua's party came fourth but in the election where women were disfranchised. In the pre-independence elections of April 1965, the BNP won 31 parliamentary seats out of a total of 60 and thus became a legitimate government that eventually took Basotho to independence in October 1966, despite protests from opposition BCP and MFP who now wanted independence postponed. Chief Leabua did lose his seat and had to stand for election in a safe seat later. He took office as Prime Minister on 7 July 1965.

Soon after Basutoland gained independence in 1966 as Lesotho, executive power was transferred from the British High Commissioner to the Prime Minister. Jonathan's government took a pacifist stand in South Africa, and this was supported by independent Southern African states such as Zambia, Malawi, Botswana, and Tanzania among others as they understood the unique situation Lesotho was in as it is completely surrounded by the Republic of South Africa and the majority of its people work in the mines there; also because Jonathan at the time thought that he could talk sense with South African prime ministers Henrik Verwoerd and Balthazar Johannes Vorster, who were contemporary with him. Jonathan was hostile to the Pan Africanist Congress of South Africa who supported the Basutoland Congress Party (BCP) and Marematlou Freedom Party (MFP, but friendly to the African National Congress (ANC). He forged closer links with the ANC after the PAC-backed Lesotho Liberation Army, the exiled BCP military wing, prepared to target Lesotho after 1973.

== State of emergency ==
Early results of the first post-independence elections in January 1970 indicated that the Basotho National Party (BNP) might lose control. Under the leadership of Prime Minister Chief Leabua Jonathan, the ruling BNP refused to cede power to the rival Basotholand Congress Party (BCP), although the BCP was widely believed to have won the elections. Citing election irregularities, Prime Minister Leabua Jonathan nullified the elections, declared a national state of emergency, suspended the constitution, and dissolved the Parliament. In 1973, an appointed Interim National Assembly was established. With an overwhelming progovernment majority, it was largely the instrument of the BNP, led by Prime Minister Jonathan. In addition to the Jonathan regime's alienation of Basotho powerbrokers and the local population, South Africa had virtually closed the country's land borders because of Lesotho support of cross-border operations of the African National Congress (ANC). Moreover, South Africa publicly threatened to pursue more direct action against Lesotho if the Jonathan government did not root out the ANC presence in the country. This internal and external opposition to the government combined to produce violence and internal disorder in Lesotho that eventually led to a military takeover in 1986.

Under a January 1986 Military Council decree, state executive and legislative powers were transferred to the King who was to act on the advice of the Military Council, a self-appointed group of leaders of the Royal Lesotho Defense Force (RLDF). A military government chaired by Justin Lekhanya ruled Lesotho in coordination with King Moshoeshoe II and a civilian cabinet appointed by the King.

In February 1990, King Moshoeshoe II was stripped of his executive and legislative powers and exiled by Lekhanya, and the Council of Ministers was purged. Lekhanya accused those involved of undermining discipline within the armed forces, subverting existing authority, and causing an impasse on foreign policy that had been damaging to Lesotho's image abroad. Lekhanya announced the establishment of the National Constituent Assembly to formulate a new constitution for Lesotho with the aim of returning the country to democratic, civilian rule by June 1992. Before this transition, however, Lekhanya was ousted in 1991 by a mutiny of junior army officers that left Phisoane Ramaema as Chairman of the Military Council.

== Racial policy and opposition to apartheid ==
Despite Lesotho's economic dependence on South Africa and the government's official policy during the 1970s of dialogue with its neighbour, Jonathan began criticizing the South African government's policy of apartheid supporting for the prohibited African National Congress (ANC) when international advisers suggested Pretoria's days were numbered.

During the late 1970s, Jonathan, despite his regime's protests to Libya, nevertheless accused the South African government of supporting the Lesotho Liberation Army (LLA). Mokhehle did go to Pretoria but only in late 1981. The main LLA force was wiped out in 1979 but later recruits were assisted by a Transkei-based American mercenary with Rhodesian army service, Major Bob MacKenzie, son-in-law of the former CIA deputy-director, Ray Steiner Cline, a former member of the 1969 Nixon administration. The South African government denied these claims but later admitted Mokhehle was part of the notorious Vlakplaas operation.

== Awards and recognition ==
- Dag Hammarskjöld award in 1983
- Honorary PhD in education from the NUL in 1984
- Companion of O.R. Tambo Award (gold) in 2007 (posthumously)

== Downfall and death ==
On 20 January 1986, a military coup led by Major General Justin Metsing Lekhanya, under pressure both from Pretoria and the Leballo faction of the Pan Africanist Congress, deposed the Jonathan government. Leabua Jonathan was placed under house arrest in August 1986 and died of a heart attack on 5 April 1987 at the age of 73.

| Preceded by Sekhonyana Nehemia Maseribane | Prime Minister of Lesotho; 1965–1986 | Succeeded by Justin Lekhanya |
