= Basutoland Congress Party =

Political party in Lesotho

- Leader: Thulo Mahlakeng
- Founder: Ntsu Mokhehle; Potlako Leballo
- Founded: 1952
- Paramilitary wing: Lesotho Liberation Army
- Ideology: Pan-Africanism; African nationalism African socialism
- Political position: Left-wing

Party flag
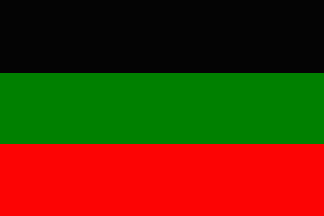

The Basutoland Congress Party is a pan-Africanist and left-wing political party in Lesotho.

The Basutoland African Congress (BAC) was founded in 1952 by Ntsu Mokhehle and Potlako Leballo. The party was renamed the Basutoland Congress Party (BCP) in 1957 and retained this name after independence in 1966, stating that Lesotho was not truly independent. Leballo left the party in 1959 to form the Pan Africanist Congress of South Africa (PAC).

The BCP lost the 1965 election relying on the party that it was the oldest and had following instead of campaigning in rural areas, reaching the grass wood level.They only focused on the urban areas where most of its executive members were based hence they lost support from their rural areas, but won in 1970. It was denied power by a coup d'état in support of the defeated prime minister Leabua Jonathan.

In 1974, following an unsuccessful rising, the BCP sent 178 men for military training by the PAC in Gaddafi's Libya. In 1979 they began a guerrilla war as the Lesotho Liberation Army (LLA).

The party won a landslide victory at the 1993 general election, and its leader Ntsu Mokhehle became prime minister. Mokhehle left the party in 1997 with his faction to form the Lesotho Congress for Democracy. The BCP was led by Tseliso Makhakhe, Qhobela Molapo, Ntsukunyane Mphanya and (currently) Thulo Mahlakeng.

At the 25 May 2002 general election, the party won 2.6% of the vote and 3 out of 120 seats.

== Election results ==
Election	Votes	%	Seats	+/–	Status
1960			30 / 80		
1965	103,068	40.04	25 / 60	▼-5	Opposition
1970	152,907	49.88	36 / 60	▲11	BNP coup d'état
1985	Boycotted				
1993	398,355	74.78	65 / 65		Supermajority
1998	62,313	10.49	0 / 89	▼-65	Extraparliamentary
2002	14,584	2.63	3 / 120	▲3	Opposition
2007	9,823	2.22	1 / 120	▼2	Opposition
2012	2,531	0.46	1 / 120	Steady	Opposition
2015	2,721	0.48	1 / 120	Steady	Opposition
2017	3,458	0.59	1 / 120	Steady	Opposition
2022	1,908	0.37	0 / 120	▼1	Extraparliamentary
