= Ntsu Mokhehle =

Former Prime Minister of Lesotho (1918–1999)

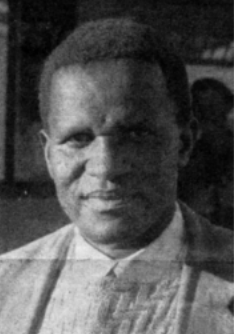

3rd Prime Minister of Lesotho
- In office 14 September 1994 – 29 May 1998
- Monarchs: Letsie III; Moshoeshoe II
- Deputy: Pakalitha Mosisili
- Preceded by: Hae Phoofolo (interim)
- Succeeded by: Pakalitha Mosisili
- In office 2 April 1993 – 17 August 1994
- Monarch: Letsie III
- Deputy: Selometsi Baholo (Note: Assassinated on 14 April 1994)
- Preceded by: Elias Phisoana Ramaema (As Chairman of the Military Council)
- Succeeded by: Hae Phoofolo (interim)

Personal details
- Born: Clement Ntsu Mokhehle; 26 December 1918 Mokhehle, Teyateyaneng, Basutoland
- Died: 6 January 1999 (aged 80) Bloemfontein, Free State Province; South Africa
- Party: Basotho Congress Party; Lesotho Congress for Democracy
- Relations: Shakhane Mokhehle, Rev.Thaele Mokhehle
- Children: T'eliso, Topollo, Mosonngoa

Ntsu Mokhehle (26 December 1918 – 6 January 1999) was a Lesotho politician, who founded Basutoland African Congress (BAC) in 1952. He founded Basutoland Congress Party in 1957 then later in 1997 founded Lesotho Congress for Democracy (LCD). He served as the third prime minister of Lesotho from 2 April 1993 to 17 August 1994 and from 14 September 1994 to 29 May 1998.

== Early life and education ==
Mokhehle was born at the small village of Mokhehle, which located few miles from Teyateyaneng on 26 December 1918. His father, Cicerone Mokhehle, was the headman of the village and one of the early Basotho Inspector of Schools. He was admitted to Fort Hare University, Transkei in 1940 where he studied science. He published articles in the Basotho newspaper Mochochonono and later involved in protesting activities which led to his expulsion from the university in 1942. Mokhehle joined the Lekhotla la Bafo during his time in Lesotho. He returned to Fort Hare University in 1944 and graduated with a MSC degree in Zoology after discovered several new species of parasites.

== Political career ==
He joined the African National Congress as a student in Fort Hare university and was instrumental in formation of ANC Youth League and became a chartered member. He return to Lesotho continue with politics and founded the Basutoland Congress Party (renamed Basotho Congress Party after independence in 1966) in 1952 and led the party (served as its first party president) until 1997 when he resigned and formed a new political party, Lesotho Congress for Democracy (LCD). He fought colonial rule in Lesotho and demanded greater self-rule. He also founded the influential Mohlabani (The Warrior) and Makatolle political newspapers. His outspoken political views caused him to be dismissed from his teaching position at Basutoland High School in 1954. His party Basutoland Congress Party won many seats during the first elections held in Lesotho in 1960. In the 1965 elections, Basutoland Congress Party came second to Basotho National Party of Leabua Jonathan. Following the 1965 elections, he formed an unsuccessful alliance with King Moshoeshoe II to block Lesotho's independence unless another general election was held and paramount chiefs were given greater authority. The alliance ended when Moshoeshoe II gathering was suppressed by the government at Thaba Bosiu in December 1966. In 1970 Basotho Congress Party won the elections and the Prime minister Leabua Jonathan refused to relinquish power, suspended the constitution and declared state of emergency. He seized power by force and many were imprisoned without trial for over a year. It was clear Leabua was an anti-democrat and he ruled through the barrel of the gun. In 1974, Basotho Congress Party tried unsuccessfully size power by attacking police stations and following that many were arrested, killed and reign of terror by Chief Leabua continued. Ntsu Mokhehle fled Lesotho and went into exile and resided in Botswana, Zambia and South Africa. During his exile, he presided over the establishment of Lesotho Liberation Army and worked covertly with South African security forces in destabilizing Lesotho.

Mokhehle was awarded honorary doctorates by Fort Hare University in 1996 and National University of Lesotho in 1990.

The dictator Leabua Jonathan was overthrown by the Military, which facilitated the return of him along with others in February 1989. Basotho Congress Party of Ntsu Mokhehle won the 1993 election by landslide which deemed fair by international observers and he ruled until 1998. He led Basotho Congress Party until 1997 when he resigned and formed a new political party, Lesotho Congress for Democracy (LCD). He did not attend an LCD conference in late January 1998 due to poor health and did not seek to be re-elected as party leader, but the party re-elected him anyway. After Mokhehle insisted he could not lead the party any longer, a new conference was held and Deputy Prime Minister Pakalitha Mosisili was elected as party leader on 21 February. The LCD won the parliamentary election that followed, and Mosisili replaced Mokhehle as Prime Minister.

== Death ==
Mokhehle died in Bloemfontein, South Africa on 6 January 1999.

Preceded by Elias Phisoana Ramaema	Prime Minister of Lesotho; 1993–1994	Succeeded by Hae Phoofolo
Preceded by Hae Phoofolo	Prime Minister of Lesotho; 1994–1998	Succeeded by Pakalitha Mosisili
