= Basotho National Party =

Political party in Lesotho

- Leader: Machesetsa Mofomobe
- President: Machesetsa Mofomobe
- Spokesperson: Masetota Leshota
- Founder: Leabua Jonathan
- Founded: 1959
- Headquarters: BNP Centre Maseru Lesotho
- Ideology: Conservatism; Christian democracy Nationalism; Populism
- Political position: Centre-right
- Continental affiliation: Democrat Union of Africa
- Colors: Blue, White, Red, Green
- National Assembly: 1 / 120

Party flag

The Basotho National Party is a political party in Lesotho, founded in 1959 in colonial Basutoland as the Basutoland National Party by Leabua Jonathan. He was Prime Minister from the 1965 general election until the 1986 coup d'état.

In the 1993 general election, the BNP received almost 23% of the vote but did not win any seats in the National Assembly, with all 65 seats going to the party's rival, the Basutoland Congress Party (BCP). It suffered a similar defeat in the 1998 general election, in which it won 24.5% of the vote but only one seat in the National Assembly. Due to its lack of success in winning constituencies, the party sought the introduction of proportional representation in deciding the allocation of seats; as a compromise, a mixed system providing for 40 compensatory seats that would be decided through proportional representation (in addition to the 80 constituency seats) was introduced.

Justin Lekhanya, the leader of the 1986 coup, was elected as Party Leader of the BNP at its Conference in March 1999. In the 25 May 2002 general election, the party won 21 compensatory seats through proportional representation with 22.4% of the vote. Since then, the party has been rocked by internal squabbles which have seen it fail to provide an effective opposition within the Lesotho parliament. In the 17 February 2007 general election, the party won only 3 out of 120 seats. Its headquarters are in Maseru, the capital city. The BNP was hostile to South Africa's intentions to incorporate Lesotho. It also provided an end to racial discrimination in Lesotho, the gradual Africanization of the civil service and business and a government which was answerable to Basotho.

== Electoral Performance ==
Election	Proportional		Constituency		Seats	+/-	Government
Election	Votes	Share	Votes	Share	Seats	+/-	Government
1960	N/A		—N/a		1 / 80	New	Opposition
1965	108,140	42.01	—N/a		31 / 60	▲30	Majority
1970	129,434	42.23	—N/a		23 / 60	▼8	BNP coup d'état
1985	Only contesting party		—N/a		60 / 60	▲37	Supermajority
1993	120,686	22.66	—N/a		0 / 65	▼60	Extra-parliamentary
1998	145,210	24.45	—N/a		1 / 89	▲1	Opposition
2002	124,234	22.41	115,085	21.44	21 / 120	▲20	Opposition
2007	29,965	6.76	24,721	5.76	3 / 120	▼18	Opposition
2012	32,788	4.31	—N/a		5 / 120	▲2	Coalition
2015	31,508	5.53	—N/a		7 / 120	▲2	Opposition
2017	23,451	4.05	—N/a		5 / 120	▼2	Coalition
2022	7,343	1.43	—N/a		1 / 120	▼4	Opposition
