= Abortion in Lesotho =

In Lesotho, abortion is illegal except when the pregnancy poses a risk to life or health, or in cases of rape or incest. Legal abortions must be provided by a "medical practitioner" and approved by another. People who provide or assist abortions may be punished. Unsafe abortions cause about one-fifth of maternal deaths in the country. Few hospitals provide abortion. Lesotho listed the grounds for legal abortion in its penal code in 2010, prior to which there was no written abortion law. In 2021, the Parliament of Lesotho and church leaders debated legalisation, with Member of Parliament Fako Moshoeshoe supporting it. The government has recommended that women seeking abortion travel to South Africa, where it is safe and legal. Clandestine abortions are available in Lesotho from foreign physicians. Women who are likely to have abortions are those who have an unmet need for contraception, are young, or get pregnant outside of marriage. Government guidelines provide for post-abortion care, but few facilities exist.

== Legislation ==
Section 45 of the Penal Code Act 2010 criminalises abortion unless there is a legal defence:

1. A person who does any act bringing about the premature termination of pregnancy in a female person with the intention of procuring a miscarriage, commits the offence of abortion.
2. It shall be a defence to a charge under this section that the act intended to terminate pregnancy was performed by a registered medical practitioner –
  1. in order to prevent significant harm to the health of the pregnant female person, and the person performing the act has obtained a written opinion from another registered medical practitioner to the effect that the termination of pregnancy is necessary to avoid significant harm to the health of the pregnant female person;
  2. in order to prevent the birth of a child who will be seriously physically or mentally handicapped, and the person performing the act has obtained in advance from another registered medical practitioner a certificate to the effect that the termination of the pregnancy is necessary to avoid the birth of a seriously physically or mentally handicapped child; or
  3. in order to terminate the pregnancy of a female person who is pregnant as a result of incestuous relationship or victim of rape.

— Penal Code Act of 2010, Section 45

The law does not specify a gestational limit. Lesotho does not have national guidelines on safe abortion or post-abortion care (PAC), but the Ministry of Health told the Lesotho Times in October 2024 that PAC guidelines were being written. The country's abortion law is one of the most restrictive in the region.

== History ==
The British colonial government did not create an abortion law in what is now Lesotho. Thus, Lesotho was subject to common law, which was primarily based on Roman-Dutch law as implemented in South Africa, while an English law principle, in which the offence of abortion required the woman to be "quick with child", may also have applied. Lesotho was considered to have a total ban on abortion before legalising abortions to save the life or health of the pregnant woman in 2010. In its 2018 review of the Addis Ababa Declaration on Population and Development, the government of Lesotho listed management of unsafe abortion as a priority. In 2010, the chair of the Parliament's Social Cluster Committee, Fako Moshoeshoe, suggested the legalisation of abortion, saying there was a high rate of abortion complications and a need for increased public health education. On 30 March 2021, 26 members of parliament met with a group of church leaders who opposed abortion. The meeting was led by the Southern Africa HIV and AIDS Information Dissemination Service, along with the SADC Parliamentary Forum. Moshoeshoe proposed a referendum on abortion. Church leaders agreed. The Lesotho Nursing Council voiced concerns about the unsafe abortion rate at an October 2024 meeting with the National Assembly following reports of medical professionals performing illegal abortions. At this meeting, Lesotho Mounted Police Service inspector Peke Petje said that some government employees were involved in illegal abortions, with some civil servants owning illegal pharmacies in Maseru.

== Prevalence ==
From 2015 to 2019, 67% of pregnancies were unintended and 24% of these resulted in abortion. Between 1990–1994 and 2015–2019, the unintended pregnancy rate remained constant and the abortion rate increased 28%. According to the 2022 State of the World Population Report, 60% of unintended pregnancies in the country result in abortion, and the unintended pregnancy rate is rising. Abortion data collection in the country is sparse.

According to the Ministry of Health, as of 2015 only 10% of hospitals provide safe abortion, and medical abortion is available in 18% of hospitals and 14% of health centres. Lesotho's guidelines for healthcare providers deal with referral for legal abortion. In the 1990s, most abortions were conducted unsafely by unqualified providers. They used chemicals, herbs, or physical methods to induce abortions. Some girls sought abortions from traditional healers.

The Ministry of Health recommends that women travel outside the country to receive abortions. In neighbouring South Africa, safe and legal abortions are available. Critics have said it is hypocritical that the government suggests getting abortions abroad instead of legalising abortion. Few women in Lesotho can afford the cost of travel. Within the country, foreign medical professionals often perform illegal procedures for high prices. They often avoid prosecution, as they can flee the country, and women are afraid to report them. Many women search for abortion services on Facebook. Dozens of Facebook pages advertise safe abortion pills and services. Women who receive these pills experience bleeding and faintness. Some receive procedures that do not work. Local newspapers advertise abortions.

As of 2015, about one-fifth of maternal deaths in Lesotho are caused by spontaneous or induced abortion. Lesotho has a high maternal mortality rate, especially in rural areas. In some hospitals, unsafe abortion may cause up to 50% of deaths of women aged 13 and up. Women are regularly reported to the police for suspected abortions. Some do not seek medical attention for unsafe abortions due to fear of prosecution.

=== Societal factors ===
Lesotho has a high unmet need for contraception, which leads to unintended pregnancies and unsafe abortions. Many women are aware of family planning services, but many do not use them or disapprove of them. Many women receive abortions after getting pregnant outside of marriage. Some face financial issues and have relationships with married men who initially support them but abandon them after they become pregnant. Pregnancies and abortions are common among adolescents. They often face judgement or refusal from providers. The Ministry of Health's National Quality Standards for Young People Friendly Health Services in Lesotho suggests the expansion of youth-friendly health services, including safe therapeutic abortions, screening for abortion complications, and PAC. The Ministry of Health holds sensitisation programs to educate young people about abortion, supported by the United Nations Population Fund.

Sexual and reproductive healthcare in Lesotho is limited by lack of personnel and training. Services rely heavily on donors, which can cause loss of funding. The U.S. government's Mexico City policy, in effect under Donald Trump, prohibits foreign organisations receiving U.S. funding from performing or distributing information about legal abortion, which limits information about Lesotho's law allowing abortion to preserve health. The policy's instatement in 2001 cut off funding for Planned Parenthood's distribution of condoms in the country.

== Post-abortion care ==
Few post-abortion care (PAC) facilities exist in Lesotho, and training for health providers is poor. As of 2015, 15% of hospitals and health centres provide PAC. The government's National Health Strategic Plan 2018–2022 noted that abortion is the number one cause of hospital admissions among females. According to the Ministry of Health, the rate of hospital admissions due to spontaneous or induced abortion is 13% as of 2018. In 2021, gynaecological treatment due to abortion was received by 35.7% of girls aged 10 to 15, 8.2% aged 15 to 19, and 10.6% aged 20 to 24. The Queen 'Mamohato Memorial Hospital, the only referral hospital in Lesotho, receives a PAC patient every day, as of 2020.

The Essential Service Package lists manual vacuum aspiration (MVA) for PAC. As of 2015, 4–7% of facilities provide MVA, and misoprostol is available in 86% of hospitals and 6% of health centres. Most providers do not want to perform MVA. In 2010, at Queen Elizabeth II Hospital in the capital Maseru, 73.7% of PAC patients received post-abortion family planning, but only 25.9% were briefed about it.

== See also ==
- Health in Lesotho
- Human rights in Lesotho
- Women in Lesotho
