= Succession to the Mosotho throne =

The Succession to the throne of Lesotho is laid down in Chapter V of the African kingdom's constitution. The current King is Letsie III.

Chapter V Article 45 of Lesotho's constitution reads:

(1) The College of Chiefs may at any time designate, in accordance with the customary law of Lesotho, the person (or the persons, in order of prior right) who are entitled to succeed to the office of King upon the death of the holder of, or the occurrence of any vacancy in, that office and if on such death or vacancy, there is a person who has previously been designated in pursuance of this section and who is capable under the customary law of Lesotho of succeeding to that office, that person (or, if there is more than one such person, that one of them who has been designated as having the first right to succeed to the office) shall become King.

(2) If, on the death of the holder of, or the occurrence of any vacancy in, the office of King, there is no person who becomes King under subsection (1), the College of Chiefs shall, with all practical speed and in accordance with the customary law of Lesotho, proceed to designate a person to succeed to the office of King and the person so designated shall thereupon become King.

== Line in Succession ==
Only male heirs can accede to the throne.

- Moshoeshoe II (1938–1996)
  - King Letsie III (born 1963)
    - (1) Prince Lerotholi Seeiso (b. 2007)
  - (2) Prince Seeiso (b. 1966)
    - (3) Prince Bereng Constantine Seeiso
    - (4) Prince Masupha David Seeiso
