= Princess 'Maseeiso Seeiso =

Princess of Lesotho

Princess 'Maseeiso
- Born: 20 November 2004 (age 21); Maseru Private Hospital, Maseru, Lesotho
Names
- 'Maseeiso Mohato Seeiso
- House: Moshesh
- Father: Letsie III of Lesotho
- Mother: Anna Karabo Motšoeneng

Princess 'Maseeiso Mohato Seeiso (born 20 November 2004) is a princess of Lesotho, the second child of King Letsie III of Lesotho and his wife Queen 'Masenate Mohato Seeiso.

She was born at Maseru Private Hospital in Maseru, the capital of Lesotho. Women are prohibited under law from ruling in Lesotho, so neither 'Maseeiso nor her older sister Senate are eligible; their younger brother Lerotholi is the heir apparent. There has been some support recently for this law to change, however.
