= Healthcare in Lesotho =

Healthcare in Lesotho is provided by several sources. The government's Ministry of Health operates district hospitals in almost every district of the country. There is also a large number of mission hospitals affiliated with numerous denominations of Christianity. The country is also served by clinics, non-governmental organizations, and community organizations.

The World Bank reported in 2017 that the country had some of the poorest health outcomes in the world. Lesotho received international aid monies to improve these outcomes, but the funds were not used to improve healthcare.

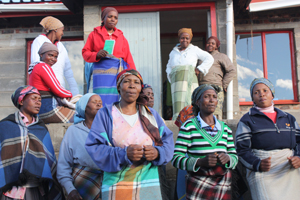
Community health workers receive training in Lesotho.

== Facilities ==
There were 117 medical facilities in Lesotho in 2019.

In the past two decades, the country has built major new hospitals in the capital city of Maseru. Queen 'Mamohato Memorial Hospital opened in 2011 and replaced the then-100-year old Queen Elizabeth II hospital. The hospital was built and administered using both public and private financing (PPP) using a Design-Build-Finance-Operate model. Also new is Maseru District Hospital, which opened in 2024. The hospital was funded and built by the Chinese government as part of the Belt and Road Initiative Both new hospitals have struggled with labor concerns.

== Staffing ==
In a report published by the World Health Organization in 2007, there were five doctors, and 62 nurses and midwives per 100,000 people in Lesotho. As a comparison, South Africa has 74 doctors and 393 nurses per 100,000 people.

Also of note is that most practicing doctors are not native to the country. In 2009, 80% of the doctors in Lesotho were foreigners visiting Lesotho from other parts of Africa, while waiting for approval to work in South Africa.

== See also ==
- Health in Lesotho
- List of hospitals in Lesotho
