= List of University of Wolverhampton people =

This is a list of notable people related to the University of Wolverhampton and its predecessor institutions, such as Wolverhampton and Staffordshire Technical College, Wolverhampton and Staffordshire College of Technology, Wolverhampton College of Art, and The Polytechnic, Wolverhampton.

== Notable alumni ==
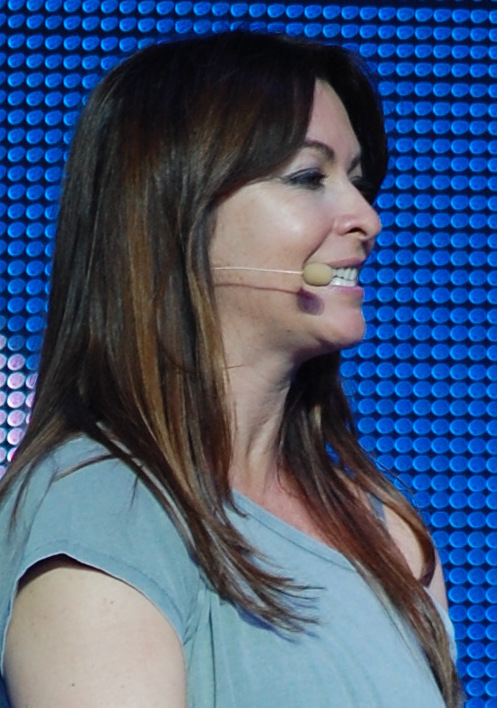
Suzi Perry

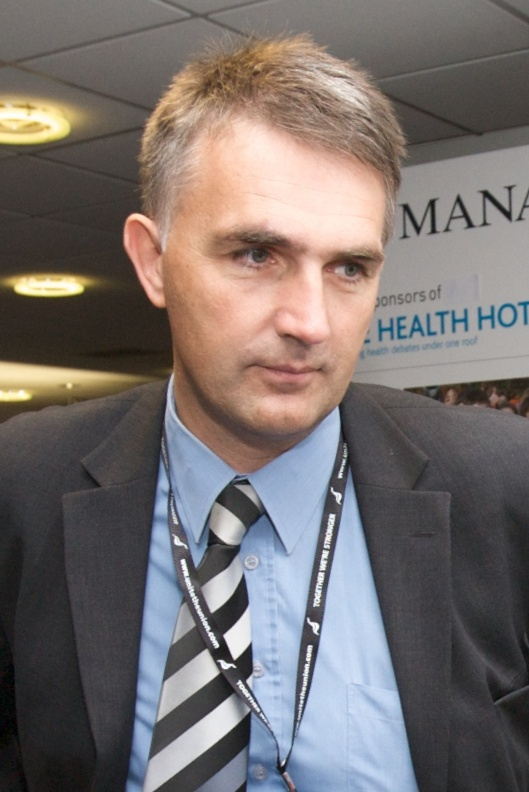
Michael John Foster

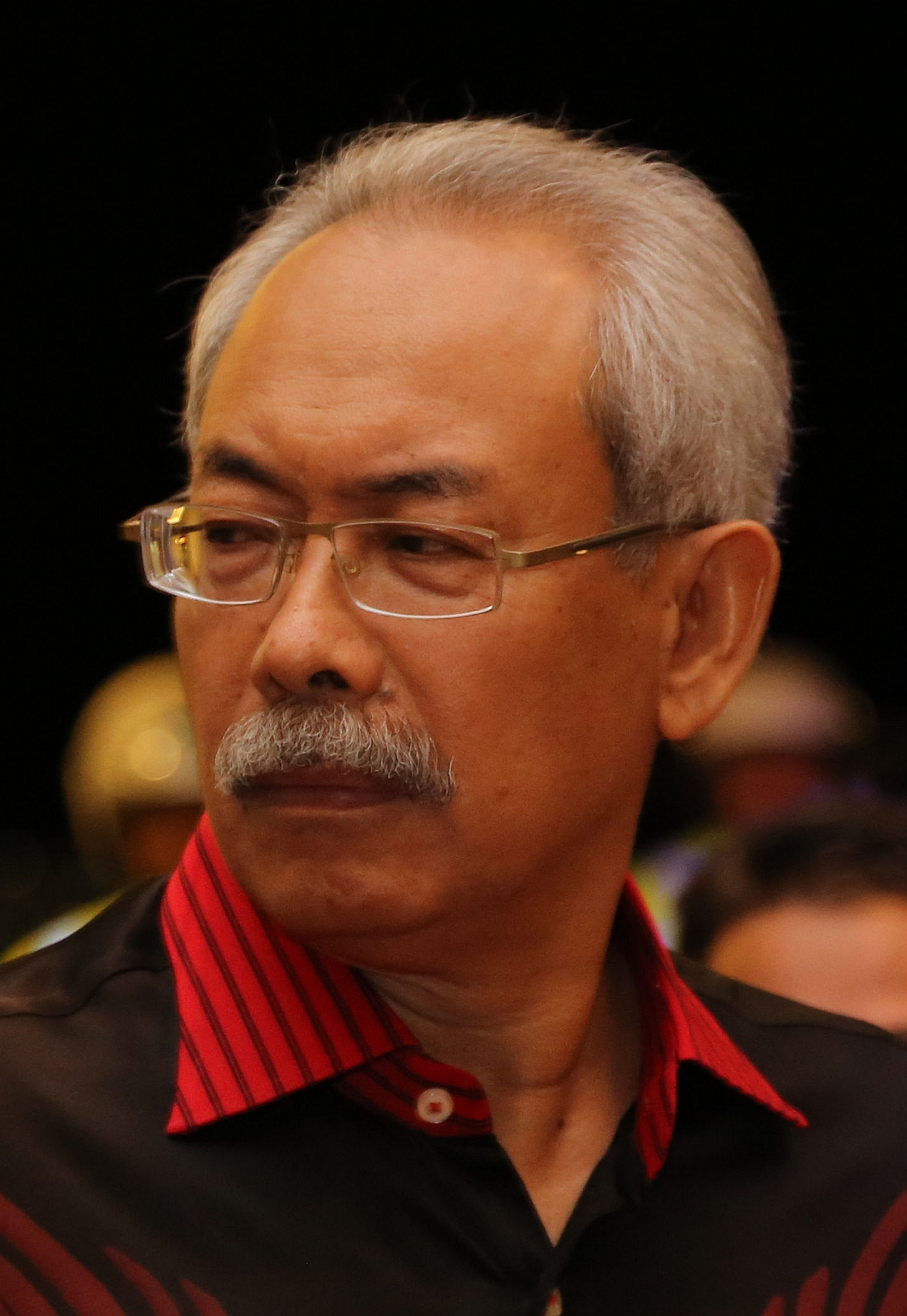
Juhar Mahiruddin

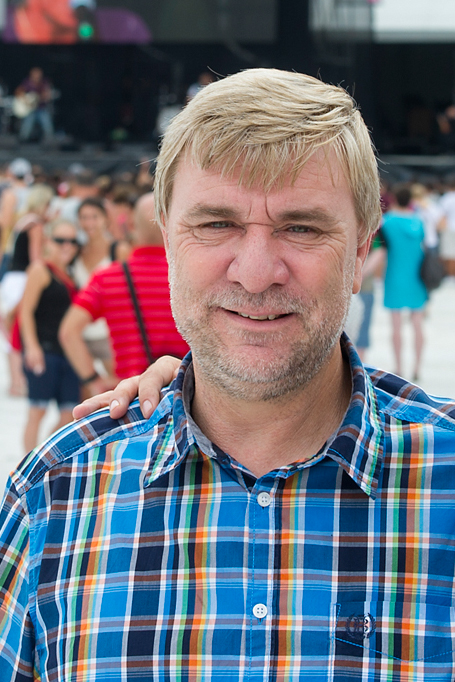
Steven Linares

- Nando Bodha, Minister of Tourism & Leisure and Minister of Agriculture, Mauritius
- Trevor Beattie (advertising executive)
- Peter Bebb, special effect artist
- Sir Terence Beckett (former director-general, CBI
- Vernie Bennett (singer, formerly of Eternal)
- Scott Boswell (former professional cricketer)
- David Carruthers (former online gambling executive)
- Mimi-Isabella Cesar, rhythmic gymnast
- Major Peter Cottrell (soldier, author and military historian)
- Claire Darke, 161st Mayor of Wolverhampton
- Paul Darke, academic, artist and disability rights activist
- Tim Dutton, Actor.
- Bill Etheridge (UKIP MEP)
- Michael John Foster (former Labour MP, Parliamentary Under-Secretary of State at the Department for International Development)
- Maggie Gee, novelist
- Jonathan Gosling, Circuit Judge (LLB, 1978)
- Matt Hayes (television angler)
- Chris Heaton-Harris (Conservative MP)
- Brian Jenkins (former Labour MP)
- Jenny Jones (former Labour MP)
- Steven Linares, MP in the Gibraltar Parliament and Minister for Sport, Culture, Heritage & Youth in the Government of Gibraltar
- Juhar Mahiruddin (Governor of Sabah, Malaysia, and Chancellor of University Malaysia Sabah)
- Mil Millington (author)
- Magnus Mills (author)
- Mark O'Shea (zoologist and television presenter)
- Cornelia Parker (artist/sculptor)
- Richard Duncan, author and philanthropist
- Julian Peedle-Calloo (television presenter)
- Suzi Perry (television presenter and journalist)
- Robert Priseman (artist)
- Ken Purchase (former Labour MP)
- Chauhdry Abdul Rashid, former Lord Mayor of Birmingham and former Chancellor of Birmingham City University
- Michael Salu (graphic artist and creative director)
- Ged Simmons (television actor)
- John Spencer-Barnes (BBC broadcaster)
- Gillian Small (University Dean for Research, City University of New York)
- Clare Teal (jazz singer and broadcaster)
- Andy Thompson (footballer)
- Patrick Trollope (editor of UK's first online-only regional newspaper)
- Yatindra Nath Varma, former Attorney General of the Government of Mauritius (LLB, 1998)
- Sir Charles Wheeler, sculptor, President of the Royal Academy
- Annemarie Wright (artist)
- David Wright (Labour MP)
- Su Keong Siong (苏建祥) a Malaysian lawyer and Ipoh Timor MP.
- Warinder Juss (Labour MP)
- Sureena Brackenridge (Labour MP)

== Notable academics ==
- Roy Ascott, artist
- John Buckley, military historian
- David Carpanini, artist
- Stephen Gill, political scientist
- Kimberly Hutchings, Professor of Politics and International Relations
- Howard Jacobson, Man Booker Prize-winning British author and journalist (Jacobson's experience formed the basis of his novel Coming from Behind, set at a "fictional" polytechnic in the Midlands.)
- Sir Anish Kapoor, sculptor
- Steve Molyneux, educational technologist
- Moses Murandu, scientist and nurse
- Jeff Randall, broadcaster/journalist
- Laura Serrant, Professor of Community and Public Health Nursing
- Sir Alan Tuckett, Professor of Education and adult education specialist
- Peter Waddington, social scientist
- Paul Willis, social scientist known for his work in sociology and cultural studies
