= List of hospitals in Lesotho =

This is a list of hospitals in Lesotho arranged by district. The Kingdom of Lesotho is divided into ten districts. Hospitals in Lesotho are mostly run by the country's The Ministry of Health and Social Welfare, or by faith-based organizations.

In a survey conducted between 1997 and 2010, there were five doctors, and 62 nurses and midwives per 100,000 people.

There were 117 medical facilities in Lesotho in 2019.

Notable Hospitals in Lesotho
Name	Town	District	Type	Affiliation	Number of beds	Year opened	Coordinates
Berea Hospital	Teyateyaneng	Berea	District Hospital	Public			29.1485°S 27.7533°E
Maluti Adventist Hospital	Mapoteng	Berea	Mission Hospital	Seventh-day Adventist Church	150	1951	29.1059°S 27.95554°E
Butha-Buthe Hospital	Butha-Buthe	Butha-Buthe	District Hospital	Public			28.7661°S 28.2462°E
Seboche Hospital	Likila	Butha-Buthe	Mission Hospital	Roman Catholic Church	50	1962	28.6850393206467°S 28.4106506766422°E
Motebang Hospital	Leribe	Leribe	District Hospital	Public			28.8723°S 28.0510°E
'Mamohau Hospital	Ha Lejone	Leribe	Mission Hospital	Roman Catholic Church			29.107792°S 28.490226°E
Mafeteng Hospital	Mafeteng	Mafeteng	District Hospital	Public			29.8105°S 27.2389°E
Botšabelo Hospital	Maseru	Maseru	Tuberculosis Hospital	Public/Partners in Health	24	2007	29.337384734845614°S 27.529311064835056°E
Makoanyane Military Hospital	Maseru	Maseru	Hospital	Military			29.3342197242532°S 27.5441083585756°E
Maseru District Hospital	Maseru	Maseru	District Hospital	Public	200	2021	29°18′57″S 27°29′13″E
Mohlomi Mental Hospital	Maseru	Maseru	Psychiatric hospital	Public	115	1960	29.3436109274556°S 27.533757952656°E
Queen 'Mamohato Memorial Hospital	Maseru	Maseru	Hospital	Public/Private	425	2011	29.3410696948855°S 27.5282299433817°E
Scott Hospital	Maseru	Maseru	Mission Hospital	Lesotho Evangelical Church			29.625576°S 27.506883°E
St Joseph's Hospital (Roma Hospital)	Roma	Maseru	Mission Hospital	Roman Catholic Church	30	1937	29.451059°S 27.723139°E
Ntsekhe Hospital	Mohale's Hoek	Mohale's Hoek	District Hospital	Public			30.1495°S 27.4792°E
Mokhlotong Hospital	Mokhotlong	Mokhotlong	District Hospital	Public			29.2911°S 29.0741°E
Machabeng Government Hospital	Qacha's Nek	Qacha's Nek	Hospital	Public	78		30.1131645°S 28.6826615°E
Tebellong Hospital	Qacha's Nek	Qacha's Nek	Mission Hospital	Lesotho Evangelical Church	50	1965	30.117104°S 28.683294°E
Quthing Hospital	Quthing	Quthing	District Hospital	Public	83		30.4057°S 27.7055°E
Paray Hospital	Thaba-Tseka	Thaba-Tseka	Mission Hospital	Roman Catholic Church	76	1938	29.48841°S 28.58269°E
St James Hospital	Mantšonyane	Thaba-Tseka	Mission Hospital	Anglican Church	55	1963	29.2866026450759°S 29.0744239210947°E

== See also ==
- Health in Lesotho
- Healthcare in Lesotho
