= 'Masenate Mohato Seeiso =

Queen of Lesotho since 2000

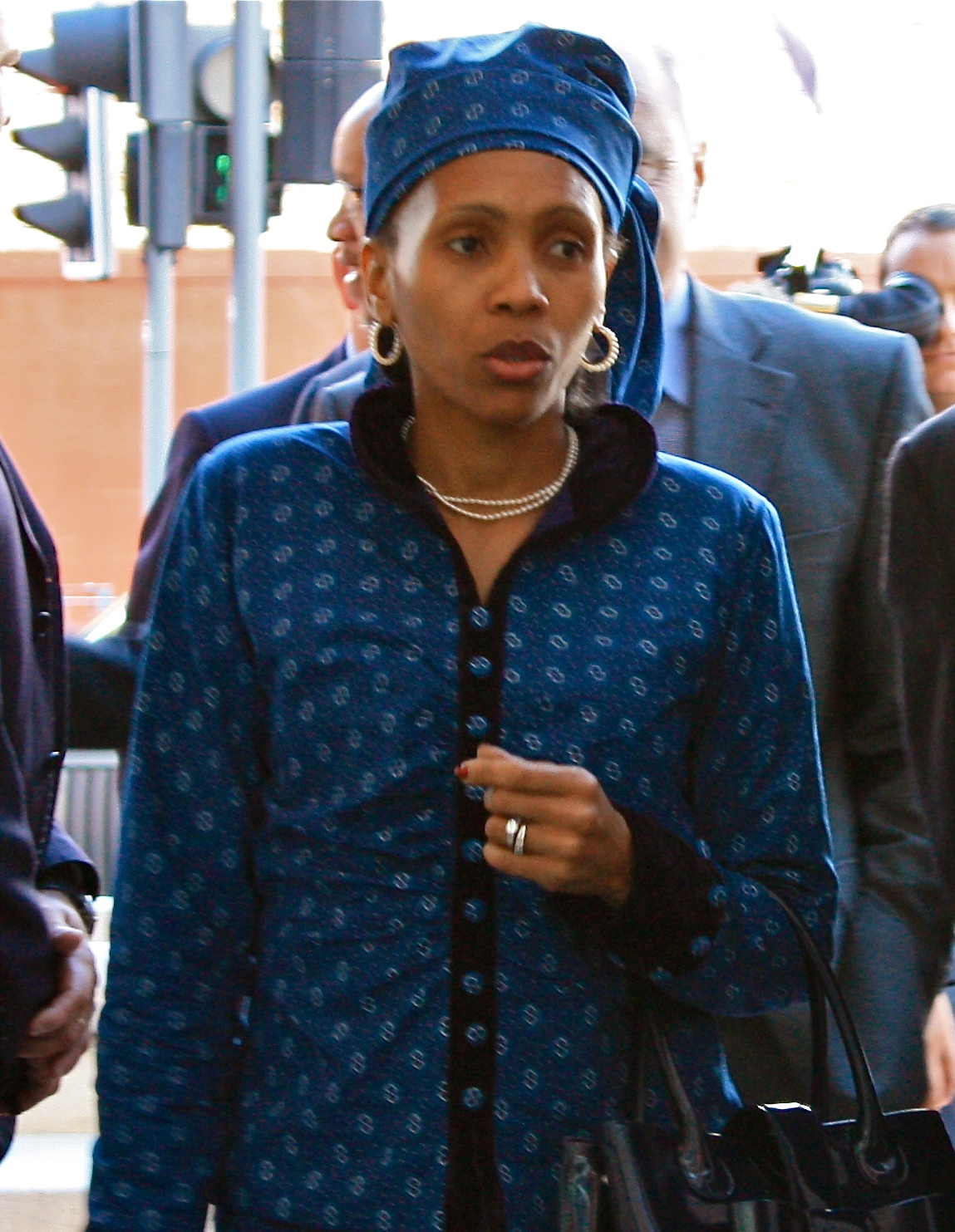
- 'Masenate in 2010

Queen consort of Lesotho
- Tenure: 18 February 2000 – present
- Born: Anna Karabo Motšoeneng; 2 June 1976 (age 50); Maluti Adventist Hospital, Mapoteng, Lesotho
- Spouse: Letsie III of Lesotho (m. 2000)
- Issue: Princess Senate; Princess 'Maseeiso; Prince Lerotholi
- House: Moshesh (by marriage)
- Father: Thekiso Motšoeneng
- Mother: 'Makarabo

'Masenate Mohato Seeiso (born Anna Karabo Motšoeneng, June 2, 1976) is Queen of Lesotho as the wife of King Letsie III of Lesotho. She was the first commoner in modern history to marry into the royal family of Lesotho. Since becoming queen, she has become the patron of several charities and has worked to promote the work of projects related to HIV/AIDS.

== Early life ==
Queen 'Masenate Mohato Seeiso was born Anna Karabo Motšoeneng at Maluti Adventist Hospital in Mapoteng in the Berea District, the eldest daughter of the five children of Thekiso Motšoeneng and his wife 'Makarabo. She was christened Anna in the Roman Catholic Church. In 1990 Queen 'Masenate enrolled at the Machabeng International College in Maseru and studied there until 1996, completing an International General Certificate for Secondary Education and an International Baccalaureate Diploma. While attending college, she took party in community service with the Angela School for the Disabled and Centre for the Blind. In 1997 she attended the National University of Lesotho (NUL) and where she studied for a Bachelor of Science degree; her studies were interrupted by her relationship with King Letsie III of Lesotho.

She is a French language learner at the Alliance Française.

== Relationship with Letsie III of Lesotho ==
Queen 'Masenate first met King Letsie III of Lesotho in 1996. This was the same year he became King for the second time, following the death of his father in a road accident.

=== Engagement and marriage ===
In October 1999, two years into her studies at the National University of Lesotho, she became engaged to King Letsie III. They were married on February 18, 2000, in Maseru. He was the only unmarried King in Africa. The ceremony was conducted in the Setsoto Stadium by Archbishop Bernard Mohlalisi, with 40,000 people present including dignitaries such as Nelson Mandela, Festus Mogae, Bakili Muluzi and Charles III, then Prince of Wales. This marked the first time in the history of modern Lesotho where a royal had married a commoner.

Karabo Motšoeneng married King Letsie III of Lesotho on February 18, 2000, in Maseru. She credited the royal family for making her welcome, in particular the influence of Queen 'Mamohato, the Queen Mother. 'Masenate and 'Mamohato grew close and the Queen found it difficult when Mamohato died in 2003, but praised her husband for supporting her at the time. In an interview with the Lesotho Times in 2014, she said "I like the fact that he listens when I advise him on various issues that are personal. For instance, I want him to be well-dressed for various functions. And, as the woman of the house, I also recommend a lot of things, food, music, movies and more educative television channels for all of us. His Majesty is a very reserved, respectful, patient, wise and humble person and he is all that in a very sweet way. These are the qualities he has sustained over the years. They have drawn me much closer to him. I love him dearly every day."

=== Motherhood and children ===
Queen 'Masenate and King Letsie have three children; Princess Senate (b. 7 October 2001), Princess 'Maseeiso (b. 20 November 2004), and Prince Lerotholi (b. 18 April 2007), They were born in a Private Hospital. She later explained that she wished she had more children, saying "Maybe I should have had one early after Prince Lerotholi but now my biological clock is telling me the time is up. I have read a lot about reproductive health-related risks and some medical researchers, in their studies, don't recommend women to consider falling pregnant at my age. When your eggs are no longer that fresh to make a healthy baby, then it's better to be on the safe side."

== Public life ==
=== Charity work ===
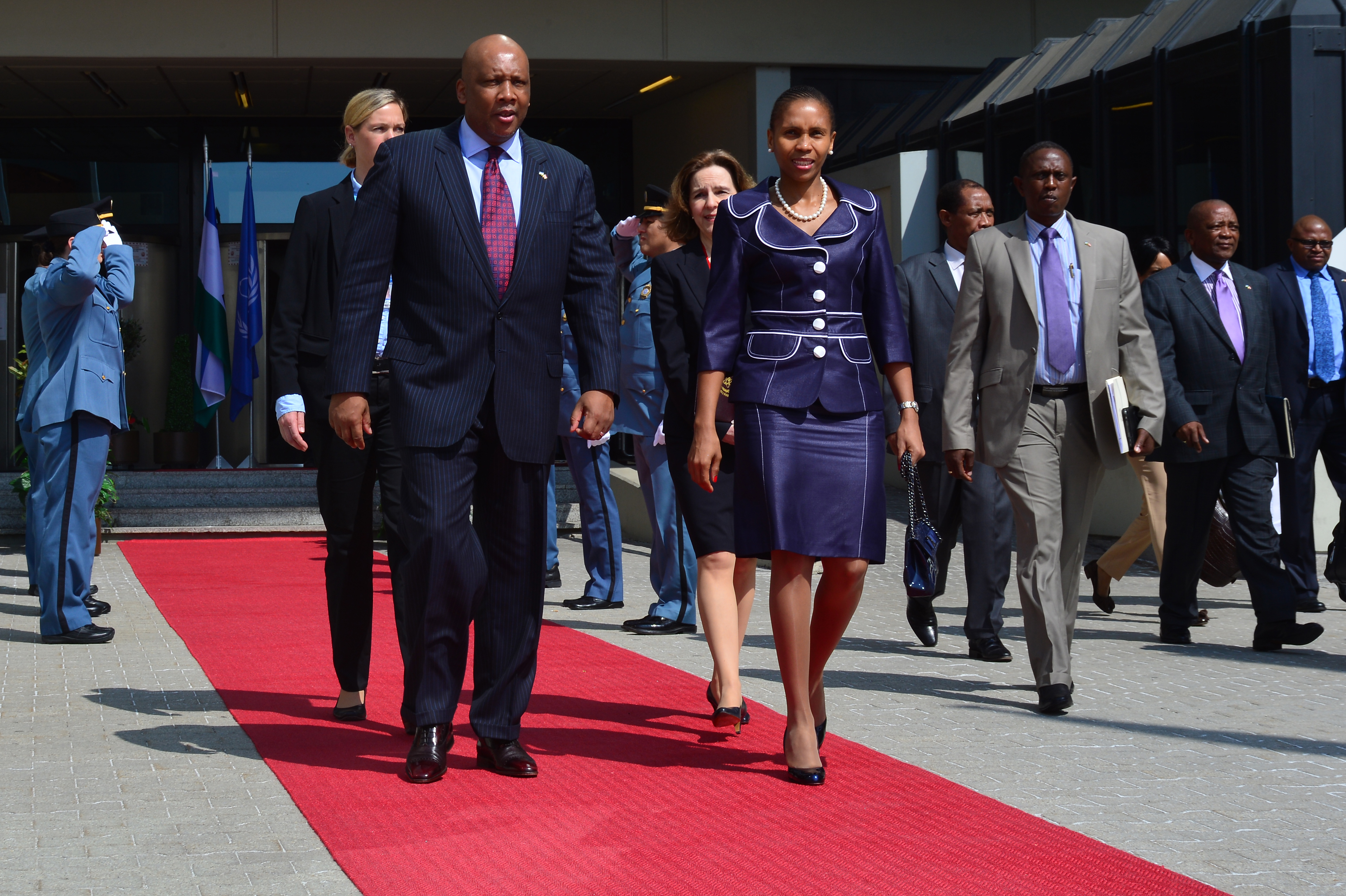
Queen 'Masenate Mohato Seeiso with King Letsie III in 2013

Queen 'Masenate Mohato Seeiso is involved in a variety of charitable projects, including Patronage of the Lesotho Red Cross Society, the SOS Children's Village, and the Machabeng International College where she studied before becoming Queen. In addition to her work with the charity People with Disabilities, Queen 'Masenate is generally interested in working with projects seeking to improve the voices of disabled people in Lesotho.

Following the death of the late Queen Mother 'Mamohato Bereng Seeiso in 2003, Queen 'Masenate Mohato Seeiso runs Hlokomela Bana (Take Care of Children).

=== Public health work ===
She has a strong interest in enabling the work undertaken with HIV/AIDS patients to be spoken of publicly, and has been involved in several awareness programmes in Lesotho. Queen 'Masenate has also undertaken visits to a variety of AIDS projects around the country, including orphanages. She also holds a First Aid Certificate.

== Honours ==
National honours

- Lesotho : Dame Commander of the Most Dignified Order of Moshoeshoe.
- Lesotho : Prince Mohato Award Bronze Medal (06/1993).

Foreign honours

- France : Commander of the Order of Academic Palms (05/07/2018).

== Notes ==
Vacant Title last held by 'Mamohato	Queen consort of Lesotho; 2000–Present	Incumbent
