= Chief Mohlomi =

Basotho chief, sage and healer (died 1814)

- Morena oa Bakoena ba Monaheng

Chiefs of Bakoena ba Monaheng
- Reign: c. 1770 – 1780
- Predecessor: Monyane
- Successor: Makhetha
- Born: 1720; Present-day Lesotho
- Died: 1814 (aged 93–94); Ngoliloe (today near Ficksburg, Free State, South Africa)
- Spouse: Maliepollo
- Issue: Mokoena, Letele, Mothoaetsi, Mojakisane
Names
- Mohlomi a Matsie
- House: Bakoena ba Monaheng
- Father: Monyane
- Occupation: Chief, Ngaka, Philosopher

Chief Mohlomi

Philosophical work
- Era: Lifaqane
- Region: Botho Philosophy
- Notable students: Moshoeshoe I; Moorosi

Chief Mohlomi (also called Mohlomi wa Monaheng; born 1720), was a Basotho chief, philosopher, sage and traditional healer who lived during the late 18th and early 19th centuries. He is remembered as one of the greatest moral teachers and healers in Southern African history and is especially significant as a mentor to King Moshoeshoe I, the founder of the Basotho nation. Chief Mohlomi died in 1814.

== Early life ==
Chief Mohlomi was born at Monaheng, in present-day western Lesotho. He belonged to the Basotho people and lived at a time of profound social, political, and environmental change in southern Africa, preceding the period of widespread upheaval known as the Mfecane or Difaqane.

From a young age, Mohlomi was noted for his intelligence, wisdom, and deep interest in healing, ethics, and social harmony. Unlike many leaders of his era who gained prominence through warfare, Mohlomi became widely respected for his peaceful philosophy and moral authority.

== Role as a Sage and Healer ==
Chief Mohlomi was celebrated as a master healer (Ngaka e kgolo) and a philosopher whose teachings emphasized compassion, restraint, justice, and reconciliation. His healing practices combined herbal knowledge with spiritual insight and moral instruction, reflecting the holistic nature of indigenous African medicine.

He travelled widely across the region, treating the sick, advising leaders, and teaching communities principles of ethical leadership. His reputation extended far beyond his immediate territory, and many chiefs sought his counsel.

Mohlomi believed that true leadership required humility and service to the people. He discouraged unnecessary violence and promoted diplomacy and negotiation as tools for resolving conflict.

== Mentorship of Moshoeshoe I ==
Chief Mohlomi is best known for his role as the mentor of Moshoeshoe I (c. 1786–1870). As a young man, Moshoeshoe was sent to Mohlomi to be educated in leadership, governance, and moral conduct.

Mohlomi's teachings profoundly shaped Moshoeshoe's character and political philosophy. He instilled in him values of mercy, generosity, strategic patience, and respect for human life—qualities that later defined Moshoeshoe's rule and contributed to the survival and unification of the Basotho nation during times of great turmoil.

Many historians regard Mohlomi as a foundational intellectual influence behind the formation of the Basotho state.

== Philosophy and teachings ==
Chief Mohlomi's philosophy centered on:

- Ethical leadership and accountability
- Peaceful coexistence between communities
- Respect for human dignity
- The responsibility of leaders to protect, not exploit, their people

His teachings were transmitted orally and preserved through Basotho oral tradition, praise poetry, and historical narratives.

== Death ==
Chief Mohlomi died in 1814. His death occurred shortly before the onset of the Mfecane, a period during which his teachings would prove crucial to the survival strategies adopted by Moshoeshoe I and the Basotho people.

== Legacy ==
Chief Mohlomi is remembered as one of Southern Africa's greatest indigenous philosophers and healers. He remains a symbol of wisdom, ethical governance, and the power of peaceful leadership in African history.

The Order of Mohlomi in Lesotho is awarded for achievement in the fields of community and social service and is sometimes referred to as the Order of Achievement.

Lesotho's public mental hospital, Mohlomi Mental Hospital, is named for Chief Mohlomi.

== See also ==
- Moshoeshoe I
- History of Lesotho
- Basotho people
- African traditional medicine
