= Maluti Adventist Hospital =

Geography
- Location: Mapoteng, Berea, Lesotho
- Coordinates: 29°07′08″S 28°01′32″E

Organisation
- Care system: Private hospital
- Type: General hospital
- Religious affiliation: Seventh-day Adventist Church

Services
- Beds: 150

History
- Opened: March 7, 1951

Links
- Website: malutisdahospital.org.ls
- Lists: Hospitals in Lesotho

Maluti Adventist Hospital is a non-profit hospital campus in Mapoteng, Lesotho that, as of 2022, serves approximately three hundred sixty thousand patients per year.

The hospital opened in 1951 and has continued to expand, adding a new wing in 1955, and an ICU unit in 2023.

The hospital is home to Maluti Adventist College, (formerly Maluti School of Nursing), one of Lesotho's four nurse education programs. The program graduated its first nurses in 1968 and has served students from many countries.

The hospital established its AIDS unit in 1995. According to a study published in the journal Psychology, Health & Medicine, the hospital pioneered the use of anti-retroviral drugs for AIDS and HIV treatment. The unit includes counseling and work training for HIV-positive people, and in 2001 added a care and treatment programme that focuses on food security for affected households.

In 2025, Newsday reported that a man was working as a doctor at the hospital after being rejected from holding a license by the Lesotho Medical, Dental, and Pharmacy Council. The report indicated that he held the position of Chief Medical Officer and performed surgeries. Hospital CEO Thabang Pulumo confirmed this account and indicated that the man would be returning to church headquarters.

== Notable people ==
- 'Masenate Mohato Seeiso, Queen of Lesotho was born here
- Moses Murandu, scientist and nurse, trained here

== See also ==
- List of Seventh-day Adventist hospitals
