= Maseru District Hospital =

Geography
- Location: Maseru, Lesotho
- Coordinates: 29°18′57″S 27°29′13″E

Organisation
- Type: Public

Services
- Beds: 200

History
- Constructed: April 2021
- Opened: 13, June 2024

Links
- Website: maserudistricthospital.com
- Lists: Hospitals in Lesotho

Maseru District Hospital is located in Maseru, the capital city of Lesotho. The hospital was built to alleviate pressure on the busy Queen 'Mamohato Memorial Hospital. It opened in June 2024 and is expected serve 400,000 patients in Maseru and surrounding districts.

The hospital includes several specialist departments including infectious disease, dermatology, and ophthalmology, as well as an intensive care unit and histopathology lab.

== Funding and opening ==
The hospital was funded and built by the Chinese government as part of the Belt and Road Initiative The hospital was built by Chinese firm Shanghai Construction Group with funding of CN¥ 400,000,000 from the government of China. The World Health Organization stated that it provided technical support for the collaboration.

Acting Chinese ambassador to Lesotho, Lyu Liangzhong, attended the opening ceremony. He emphasized that the hospital was a gift to the people of Lesotho and said:

I believe this brand-new state-of-art hospital will help improve the medical services of Lesotho and significantly increase Basotho’s well-being and health.

This year marks the 30th anniversary of the resumption of the diplomatic relations between China and Lesotho. It’s also the 200th anniversary of the founding of the Kingdom of Lesotho.

In light of the increasing political mutual trust, economic cooperation and cultural exchanges between the two countries, let’s take it as a new starting point, join hands together to break new ground and promote relations to new light.

== Operation ==
In 2025, the lone ophthalmologist at the hospital reported mismanagement and negligence at the facility. He alleged that over 100 preventable deaths had occurred since the hospital had opened its doors. He explained that the hospital lacked funds for equipment, and management failure, claims supported by medical staff. Lesotho's Health Minister, Selibe Mochoboroane, disputed the claims and suspended the whistle blower, leaving the country with a single working ophthalmologist.
