= Botšabelo Hospital =

Geography
- Location: Maseru, Lesotho
- Coordinates: 29.337384734845614°S 27.529311064835056°E

Organisation
- Type: Public

Services
- Beds: 24

History
- Opened: 1914

Links
- Lists: Hospitals in Lesotho
- Other links: https://pihlesotho.org/

Botšabelo Hospital, also known as Lesotho MDR Hospital or Lesotho MDR-TB Hospital, is located in Maseru, the capital city of Lesotho. The 24-bed facility is a specialty referral hospital treating patients with Multidrug-resistant tuberculosis exclusively. As of 2020, it was the only hospital in the country accredited to provide comprehensive tuberculosis drug resistant treatment.

Botsabelo opened as a state hospital, or leprosorium, for patients infected with leprosy in 1914. The hospital was initially more a detention center, and patients did not receive medicines. The initial structure was the repurposed accommodations of British soldiers and was built of cheap corrugated sheet metal.

The hospital was retooled for tuberculosis by Partners In Health and Lesotho's Ministry of Health in April 2007. As of 2015, the hospital employed 130 health care workers.

In 2024, Selibe Mochoboroane Mochoboroane, then Lesotho's Minister of Health, said that Lesotho had the second highest incidence of tuberculosis in the world. In 2022, over 15,000 people contracted tuberculosis in Lesotho, and approximately 14 percent of those patients died of the disease. In 2024, the incidence rate was estimated to be 724 cases per 100,000 people. The small size of Botšabelo Hospital has limited the effectiveness of control of the disease in Lesotho. This is because patients have to wait for a bed in the specialised facility to become available in order to be isolated and receive treatment. While waiting, researchers have found that sick patients infect those in their community, and can even spread hospital-acquired infections by seeking treatment at other, less specialised hospitals.
