= 'Mamohato Bereng Seeiso =

'Mamohato

Queen consort of Lesotho
- Tenure: 4 October 1966 – 12 November 1990; 25 January 1995 – 15 January 1996

Regent of Lesotho
- Regency: 5 June 1970 – 5 December 1970; 10 March 1990 – 12 November 1990; 15 January 1996 – 7 February 1996
- Born: Tabitha 'Masentle Lerotholi Mojela; 28 April 1941; Tebang, Mafeteng, Basutoland
- Died: 6 September 2003 (aged 62); Mantsonyane, Thaba-Tseka, Lesotho
- Burial: Maseru, Lesotho
- Spouse: Moshoshoe II
- Issue: King Letsie III; Prince Seeiso; Princess Constance Christina Maseeisol Princess Constance
- Father: Lerotholi Mojela, Chief of Tsakholo

'Mamohato Bereng Seeiso (née Princess Tabitha 'Masentle Lerotholi Mojela) (28 April 1941 – 6 September 2003) served as the Regent Head of State of Lesotho on three occasions: 5 June to 5 December 1970, 10 March to 12 November 1990 and 15 January to 7 February 1996.

== Biography ==
'Mamohato was born at Tebang, located in the District of Mafeteng in what was then Basutoland. She was the youngest child of Lerotholi Mojela (1895–1961), Chief of Tsakholo.

The princess was sent to study at Bath Training College of Home Economics in the United Kingdom.

A year after the death of her father, she married King Moshoeshoe II. During her reign, she helped improve children's education in Lesotho.

The Queen Mother died on September 6, 2003, of heart failure while at a Catholic retreat for the Order of Saint Cecilia at the Auray Mission in Mantsonyane.

=== Charity work and legacy ===
There is a hospital named for her, the Queen 'Mamohato Memorial Hospital.

The queen, known as the "Mother of the Nation", created Hlokomela Bana ("Take Care of Children" in Sesotho) in the 1980s to provide care and support for some of the most vulnerable children in Lesotho. Hlokomela Bana works closely with principal chiefs to identify what support can be best provided to those who have lost their parents or are living with disabilities.

== Family ==
She was the wife of King Moshoeshoe II and the mother of King Letsie III, Prince Seeiso and Princess Constance Christina 'Maseeiso.

Preceded by New title	Queen consort of Lesotho; 1966–1996	Succeeded by 'Masenate
