= Mohlomi Mental Hospital =

Geography
- Location: Maseru, Lesotho
- Coordinates: 29.3436109274556°S 27.533757952656°E

Organisation
- Care system: Public hospital
- Type: Psychiatric hospital

Services
- Beds: 115

History
- Construction started: 1960
- Opened: 1965

Links
- Website: {{URL|example.com|optional display text}}
- Lists: Hospitals in Lesotho

Mohlomi Mental Hospital is a public psychiatric hospital in Maseru, the capital of Lesotho. It opened in 1965. Mohlomi is the Lesotho's national referral hospital and is the only referring hospital for mental health in the country.

== History ==
The hospital is named for Chief Mohlomi, the 18th-century Basotho healer.

The hospital's first patients were prisoners from the Mohale's Hoek Prison in 1965. The hospital then officially opened in August 1966 and admitted patients for mental health needs.

== Operations ==
In 2010, the hospital opened a separated, guarded, 35-bed ward for patients charged with crimes. In 2011, the hospital was renovated and number of beds increased from 60 to 115. A 2024 article described its assets as including, "female and male wards, an outpatient department, a forensic department, a geriatric ward and a child and adolescent ward."

The hospital employed four doctors and received weekly visits from a psychiatrist with Partners in Health according to a report from 2023. The hospital employs social workers to assist patients with transitioning out of care, taking medication, and providing counseling.

In 2025, the hospital's public relations officer commented to the press that the hospital building was in urgent need of repair or replacement. She noted that ceilings and walls in the building were unstable, and that the hospital was overburdened with patients. She explained further, saying

"Overcrowding is particularly severe in the forensic department, which holds 80 patients in a facility designed for just 34 beds, forcing many to sleep on mattresses."

The hospital is periodically inspected by the Ombudsman Advocate. In recent years, the Ombudsman Advocate Tlotliso Polaki, has raised concerns about the length and constitutionality of detainment at the hospital and proper accommodations for female patients, among other concerns.

== Budget ==
In 2011, Lesotho's mental health expenditure was 1.8% of the country's health spending. The same report shows that Mohlomi Mental Hospital uses 82.11% of this allocation. In 2024, the acting director of the hospital noted that the hospital received 1.8 percent of the annual health budget, amounting to L8,000,000.
