= Moses Murandu =

Zimbabwean scientist

- Born: Zimbabwe
- Education: Maluti Adventist Hospital, St Monica’s Maternity Hospital (Midwifery), University of Birmingham (PhD)
- Awards: Ethel Bell Award, Journal of Wound Care in March 2018
- Scientific career
- Fields: Wound healing
- Workplaces: False Bay Hospital, University of Wolverhampton
- Patrons: Fondation de France

Moses Murandu (~1966) is a Zimbabwean scientist and nurse working at the University of Wolverhampton.

Murandu grew up in rural Zimbabwe with his father and younger brother. As a child, he was directed by his family to dress his wounds with salt. He also recalled that when his father, Aron Majazi Munawa, had extra funds, he would instead use sugar to treat open wounds.

Murandu experienced the illness and death of his younger brother as a child. He went on to study nursing and midwifery in Lesotho and South Africa respectively. After the end of Apartheid, Murandu worked in South Africa as a nurse at False Bay Hospital where he was subjected to racism from the staff and patients. In 1997, Marandu was recruited to the United Kingdom to work as a nurse in the National Health Service

After finding that sugar was not commonly used in British hospitals, Murandu set about making the case for the treatment. He self-funded an early study, and gained support from staff at the University of Birmingham and completed the first trial of the treatment in 2011 at Selly Oak Hospital.

Murandu has won numerous awards from the journal Wound Care, including in 2017, first place in the category of "The best research from a Developing Country" He continues his work as a senior lecturer and researcher in natural health remedies at the University of Wolverhampton.
