= Princess Senate Seeiso =

Princess of Lesotho

Princess Senate of Lesotho
- Born: 7 October 2001 (age 25); Maseru Private Hospital, Maseru, Lesotho
Names
- Senate Mary Mohato Seeiso
- House: Moshoeshoe
- Father: Letsie III of Lesotho
- Mother: Anna Karabo Motšoeneng

Princess Senate Mohato Seeiso (born 7 October 2001) is a princess of Lesotho, the eldest child of King Letsie III of Lesotho and his wife Queen 'Masenate Mohato Seeiso.

Princess Senate was born at Maseru Private Hospital in Maseru, the capital of Lesotho. The current laws governing the Line of succession to the Lesothan throne bar women from succeeding to the throne although there has been support within Lesotho for a change in the rules. No changes have taken place yet and the birth of a brother Prince Lerotholi Seeiso in 2007 means that he becomes the new heir to the throne.

She was baptised into the Catholic Church with the name of "Mary" on November 10, 2001.

She graduated from the University of Ottawa in 2024.

Princess Senate is the patron of the non-governmental organization Coalition on the Rights of the Child, which works to monitor and implement the Convention on the Rights of the Child in Lesotho.
