= Lesotho Evangelical Church in Southern Africa =

The Lesotho Evangelical Church in Southern Africa (LECSA, Sotho: Kereke ea Evangeli Lesotho e Boroa ho Afrika) is one of the oldest Protestant churches in Africa, established in 1833 by the Paris Evangelical Missionary Society. They received the support of the local king, and under its protection the church developed. The first mission station was in Morija. In 1868 Lesotho became a British protectorate. In 1898 a Synod was opened, while in 1964 the church gained independence.

The Lesotho Evangelical Church has 340,500 members, 112 parishes and hundred house fellowships.

The church affirms the Apostles Creed and Heidelberg Catechism. The church is Presbyterian in church government, with sessions, consistory and Presbyteries and the General Assembly. Official languages are English and Sesotho. It is a member of the World Communion of Reformed Churches and the All Africa Conference of Churches.
