= Health in Lesotho =

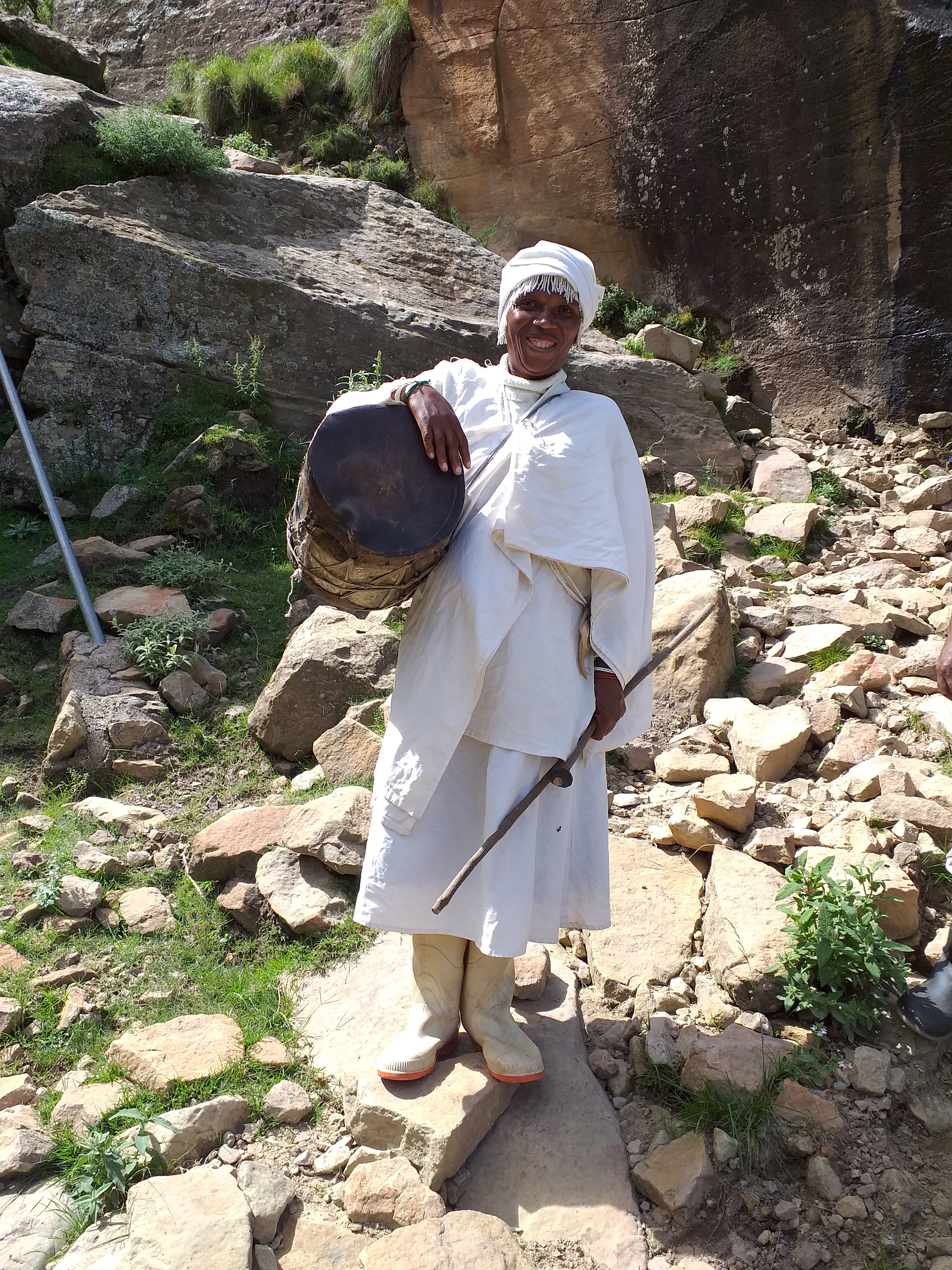
Traditional medicine woman travelling on foot over mountain range

Lesotho's Human development index value for 2018 was 0.518—which put the country in the low human development category—positioning it at 164 out of 189 countries and territories. Health care services in Lesotho are delivered primarily by the government and the Christian Health Association of Lesotho. Access to health services is difficult for many people, especially in rural areas. The country's health system is challenged by the relentless increase of the burden of disease brought about by AIDS, and a lack of expertise and human resources. Serious emergencies are often referred to neighbouring South Africa. The largest contribution to mortality in Lesotho are communicable diseases, maternal, perinatal and nutritional conditions.

The Human Rights Measurement Initiative finds that Lesotho is fulfilling 72.7% of what it should be fulfilling for the right to health based on its level of income. When looking at the right to health with respect to children, Lesotho achieves 80.5% of what is expected based on its current income. In regards to the right to health amongst the adult population, the country achieves only 43.9% of what is expected based on the nation's level of income. Lesotho falls into the "fair" category when evaluating the right to reproductive health because the nation is fulfilling 93.8% of what the nation is expected to achieve based on the resources (income) it has available.

== Health indicators ==
=== Crude death rate and life expectancy ===
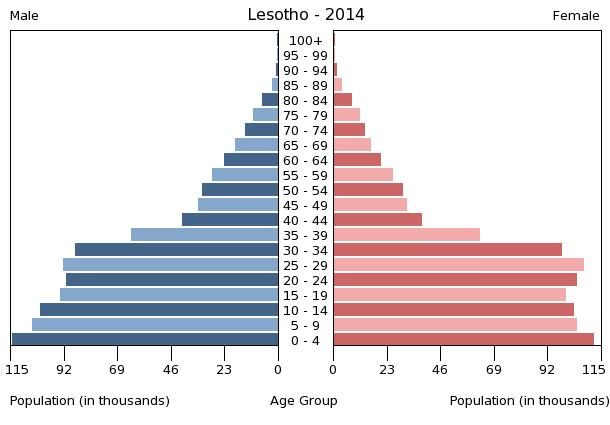
The population pyramid of Lesotho illustrates the age and sex structure of population and may provide insights about political and social stability, as well as economic development. The population is distributed along the horizontal axis, with males shown on the left and females on the right. The male and female populations are broken down into 5-year age groups represented as horizontal bars along the vertical axis, with the youngest age groups at the bottom and the oldest at the top. The shape of the population pyramid gradually evolves over time based on fertility, mortality, and international migration trends.

In 2019, the Crude Death Rate in Lesotho (per 1,000 people) were 13.936 people. The most recent (2019) life expectancy at birth in Lesotho is 47 for males and 54 for females. In 2005 life expectancy was 42.5, giving an increase of 11 years over the past 13 years.

=== Health economy ===
The total expenditure on health as percentage of GDP is 10.6 (2014). Out-of-pocket expenditure per capita on healthcare was $42.33 in 2014. The same year public expenditure on healthcare as percent of total healthcare expenditure 76.12%.

=== Child and infant mortality ===
Child mortality indicators such as Under-Five Mortality Rate (U5MR), Infant Mortality Rate (IMR) and Neonatal Mortality Rate (NMR) are estimates that measures child survival, but they also reflect social, economic, and environmental conditions that the people of the country have, such as their health care.

Under 5 mortality rate is 86 per 1,000 live births (2019). Under-five mortality rate is the probability of dying between birth and exactly 5 years of age, expressed per 1,000 live births. The infant mortality rate, in 2019 was 68.1 (per 1,000 live births).

Child and Infant Mortality Rates in Lesotho compared to the World Average
	Lesotho	World Average	Ref
Under-Five Mortality Rate (U5MR) per 1,000 live births	86.40	37.70	
Infant Mortality Rate (IMR) per 1,000 live births	68.10	28.20	
Neonatal Mortality Rate (NMR) per 1,000 live births	42.80	17.50	

=== Nutrition ===
Malnutrition is a major problem in Lesotho. 33.4% of children under five are moderately or severely stunted. Children born with a low birth weight (<2500 g) was in 2014 14.6%.

=== Maternal health and family planning ===
Adolescent birth rate is 92.7 births per 1,000 women ages 15–19 (2019). Contraceptive prevalence, any method is 60.2 (% of married or in-union women of reproductive age, 15–49 years). Antenatal care coverage, (at least one visit) 95.2%. Maternal mortality ratio is very high with the number 487 (deaths per 100,000 live births). SDG goal is under 70. The proportion of births attended by skilled health personnel are 77.9%.

== Burden of disease ==
The burden of disease refers to the sum of mortality and morbidity (the prevalent diseases), often measured by the metric called "Disability Adjusted Life Years" (DALYs). This metric does not only consider if people die from the diseases, but they also include the suffering it causes to the diseased.

=== Communicable diseases ===
Lesotho's burden of disease is centered around Communicable Diseases (CDs), where HIV/AIDS is the leading cause of DALYs, followed by tuberculosis and Lower respiratory infections.

==== Human Immunodeficiency Virus and AIDS (HIV/AIDS) ====
HIV/AIDS is contributing to as much as 34.76% of all DALYs in Lesotho. However, the percent of total DALYs has declined since 2005 where HIV/AIDS contributed to 46.08% of total DALYs.

Lesotho is severely afflicted by AIDS and has one of the highest infection rates in the world. In 2005 there were 30,000 new infections compared to 21,000 new infections in 2016. In urban areas, about 50 percent of women under 40 are infected with human immunodeficiency virus.

The country regards HIV as one of its most important development issues, and the government is addressing the pandemic through its HIV/AIDS National Strategic Plan. Coverage of some key HIV/AIDS interventions has improved, including prevention of mother to child transmission and antiretroviral therapy. Prevention of mother to child transmission coverage increased from about 5 percent in 2005, to 31 percent in 2007. The roll-out of antiretroviral therapy has made good progress, with 38,586 people receiving treatment by 2008.

The "Know Your Status" campaign boosted the number of people being tested for human immunodeficiency virus infection to 229,092 by the end of 2007, 12 percent of the population and three times the number tested in 2005. The program is funded by the Clinton Foundation and started in June 2006. Bill Clinton and Microsoft chairman Bill Gates visited Lesotho in July 2006 to assess its fight against AIDS. As a result, the annual rate at which adults in the population who are HIV-negative become HIV-positive declined from 2.9 percent in 2005 to 2.3 percent in 2007, lowering the estimated annual number of new infections from 26,000 to 21,560. These are the first signs of a decline in the HIV epidemic.

The Apparel Lesotho Alliance to Fight AIDS is an industry-wide program providing prevention and treatment, including ARVs when these are necessary, for the 46,000 mainly women workers in the Lesotho apparel industry. It was launched in May 2006. The program is helping to combat two of the key drivers of the HIV/AIDS epidemic: poverty and gender inequality. Surveys within the industry by ALAFA show that 43 percent of employees have HIV.

Prince Harry of UK co-founded the charity Sentebale in Lesotho, for children with HIV/AIDS. The other co-founder is the Prince of Lesotho.

==== Tuberculosis (TB) ====
Tuberculosis attributes to 7.1% of total DALYs in Lesotho (2019). Lesotho has a very high incidence rate of tuberculosis with 665 cases per 100,000 people (2017). Treatment success rate is 77% (2016). The mortality rate is 46 per 100,000 people (2017). Approximately 70% of patients with tuberculosis in Lesotho are co-infected with human immunodeficiency virus.

==== COVID-19 ====
While the DALYs for COVID-19 remain unknown, Lesotho's humanitarian situation has worsened along with the increase of COVID-19 cases and deaths. The country has confirmed cases of the Delta variant and confirmed new cases has exceeded the WHO threshold of resurgence >20%. As of 28 August 2021, 201,795 vaccines doses have been administered. By 15 September 2021, Lesotho had a cumulative of 14,395 confirmed COVID-19 cases and 403 deaths.

=== Non-communicable diseases ===
==== Stroke ====
Stroke is the leading cause of DALYs among the Non-Communicable Diseases (NCDs), but only accounts for 2.65% of total DALYs in Lesotho.

==== Diabetes ====
Diabetes is the second leading cause of DALYs among the NCDs, accounting for 2.3% of total DALYs.

=== Injuries ===
==== Road injuries ====
Road traffic injuries accounts for a total of 3.06% DALYs. These injuries may cause large economic losses to individuals and their families. Economic loss happens due to cost of treatment and lost productivity for those killed or disabled by their injuries, as well as loss of income for the family members if they can't attend work or school while taking care for the injured.

==== Interpersonal violence ====
Interpersonal violence, such as physical, sexual, or psychological (emotional) violence, deprivation and neglect, accounts for 2.7% of total DALYs. Interpersonal violence can make individuals more prone to a broad range of emotional, behavioral, and physical health problems.

=== Suicide ===
Suicide is a significant social issue in Lesotho, having the highest suicide rate in the world. According to the World Health Organization, 87.5 people per 100,000 of the population take their own life every year in Lesotho.

== See also ==
- Healthcare in Lesotho
- List of hospitals in Lesotho
