= Letsie III =

King of Lesotho (1990–1995; since 1996)

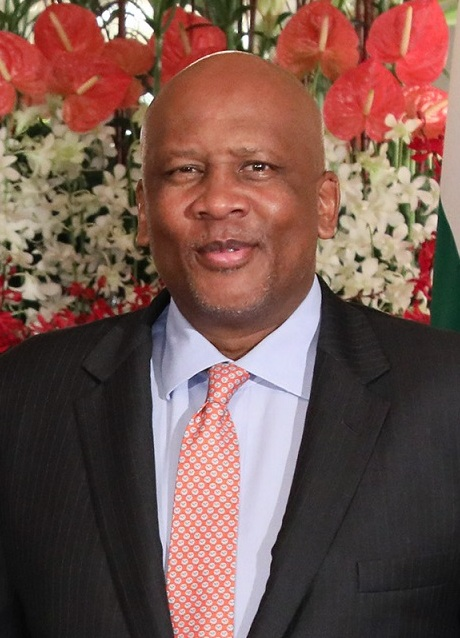
- Letsie in 2019

King of Lesotho
- Reign: 7 February 1996 – present
- Coronation: 31 October 1997
- Predecessor: Mamohato (regent); Moshoeshoe II
- Heir apparent: Lerotholi Seeiso
- Reign: 12 November 1990 – 25 January 1995
- Predecessor: Moshoeshoe II
- Successor: Moshoeshoe II
- Prime Ministers: See list: Justin Lekhanya; Elias Phisoana Ramaema; Ntsu Mokhehle; Hae Phoofolo (acting); Ntsu Mokhehle
- Born: Mohato Bereng Seeiso; 17 July 1963 (age 63); Scott Hospital, Morija, Basutoland (now Lesotho)
- Spouse: Anna Motšoeneng (m. 2000)
- Issue Detail: Princess Senate Seeiso; Princess 'Maseeiso Seeiso; Prince Lerotholi Seeiso
Names
- David Mohato Bereng Seeiso
- House: Moshoeshoe
- Father: Constantine Bereng Seeiso Moshoeshoe II
- Mother: Mamohato
- Religion: Roman Catholicism

Letsie III (born Mohato Bereng Seeiso; 17 July 1963) is King of Lesotho. He succeeded his father, Bereng Seeiso Moshoeshoe II, who was forced into exile in 1990. His father was briefly restored in 1995 but died in a car crash in early 1996, so Letsie succeeded him again for a second reign. As a constitutional monarch, most of King Letsie's duties as monarch of Lesotho are ceremonial. In 2000, he declared HIV/AIDS in Lesotho to be a natural disaster, prompting immediate national and international response to the epidemic.

== Biography ==
Letsie III was born on 17 July 1963 at the Scott Hospital in Morija, a town south of the capital Maseru. He was educated in the United Kingdom at Ampleforth College. From there, he went on to study at the National University of Lesotho, where he graduated with a Bachelor of Arts Degree in Law. He then went on to study at the University of Bristol (Diploma in English Legal Studies, 1986), Wolfson College, Cambridge (Development Studies, 1989), and Wye College (Agricultural Economics). He completed his studies in 1989, when he returned to Lesotho.

He was installed as the Principal Chief of Matsieng on 16 December 1989.

His coronation took place on 31 October 1997 at Setsoto Stadium. Charles, Prince of Wales attended the ceremony.

On 1 December 2016, in Rome, King Letsie III was appointed as the Food and Agriculture Organization's newest Special Ambassador for Nutrition by the Organization's Director-General, José Graziano da Silva.

== Personal life ==
=== Marriage and children ===
In 2000, King Letsie married Karabo Motšoeneng, with whom he has two daughters and one son:

- Princess Mary Senate Mohato Seeiso, born 7 October 2001 at Maseru Private Hospital in Maseru.
- Princess 'Maseeiso Mohato Seeiso, born 20 November 2004 at Maseru Private Hospital in Maseru.
- Prince Lerotholi David Mohato Bereng Seeiso, born 18 April 2007 at Maseru Private Hospital in Maseru.

=== Religion ===
King Letsie III is one of only two Catholic sovereigns of non-European lineage anywhere in the world, the other being the Māori queen Nga wai hono i te po. He is a member of the Sacred Military Constantinian Order of Saint George and has been credited with promoting the principles of his Catholic faith in Lesotho.

== Patronages ==
- Patron of the Prince Mohato Award (Khau ea Khosana Mohato).

Chancellor de l'Université Nationale du Lesotho

== Honours ==
=== National ===
- Lesotho: Grand Master of the Most Dignified Order of Moshoeshoe (Order of Dignity).
- Lesotho: Grand Master of the Most Courteous Order of Lesotho.
- Lesotho: Grand Master of the Most Meritorious Order of Mohlomi (Order of Achievement).
- Lesotho: Grand Master of the Most Loyal Order of Ramatseatsane (Distinguished Service Order).
- Lesotho: Grand Master of the Most Gallant Order of Makoanyane (Order of Bravery).
- Lesotho: Outstanding Service Medal.

=== Foreign ===
- (Kingdom of the Two Sicilies) Two Sicilian Royal Family: Bailiff Knight Grand Cross of Justice of the Royal Order of Saint George (8 October 2013).

Letsie III House of Moshoeshoe Born: 17 July 1963
Regnal titles
Preceded by Mamohato; Regent	King of Lesotho; 1990–1995	Succeeded by Moshoeshoe II
Preceded by Mamohato; Regent	King of Lesotho; 1996–present	Incumbent; Heir apparent: Lerotholi Seeiso
