= Women in Lesotho =

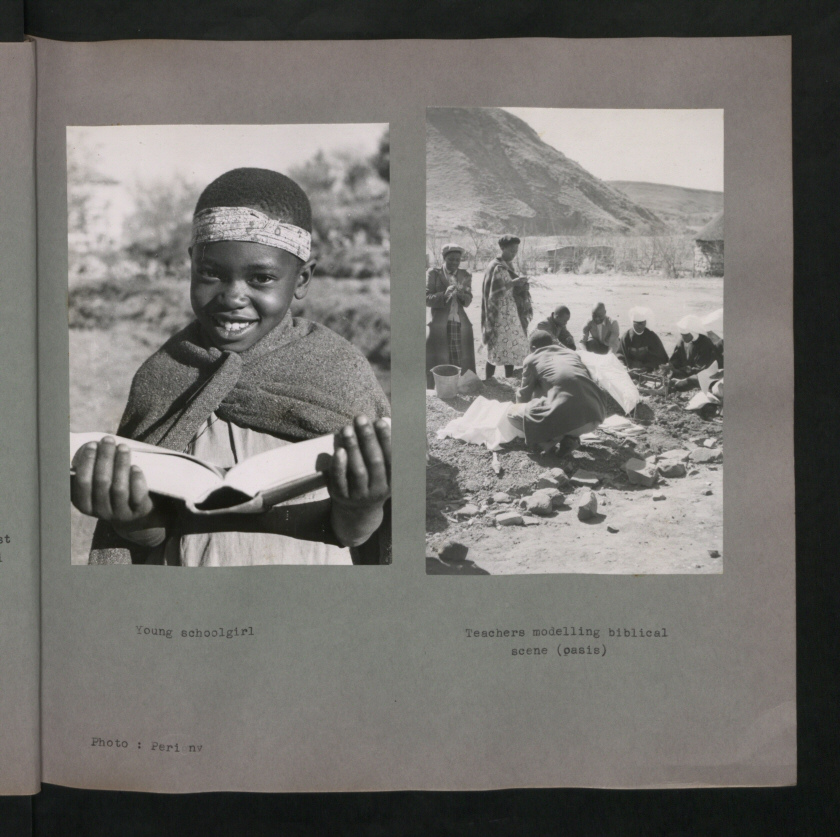
- Lesotho School Girl

General statistics
- Maternal mortality (per 100,000): 487 (2017)
- Women in parliament: 22.7% (2017)
- Women in labour force: 59.27% (2017)

Gender Inequality Index
- Value: 0.557 (2021)
- Rank: 144th out of 191

Global Gender Gap Index
- Value: 0.700 (2022)
- Rank: 87th out of 146

In 2017, 1.1 million women were living in Lesotho, making up 51.48% of the population. 33% of women are under 15 years of age, 61.4% are between 15 and 64 years old and 5.3% are over 64 years old. They received full legal status in 2008 with the passage of The Lesotho Bank Savings and Development Act of 2008. Women in Lesotho die at a disproportionate rate from HIV/AIDs. Historically, women have wielded power as heads of households, with control over household financial decisions. The government has taken steps to ensure more equal representation of genders in government with quotas, and women in Lesotho are more highly educated than men. Still, domestic abuse, sexual violence, lack of social mobility, and aforementioned health crises are persistent issues. Social and economic movements, like the mass immigration of men to South Africa, and the rise of the garment industry, have contributed to both the progress and problems facing women in Lesotho today.

== Gender equality ==
=== Education ===
Lesotho is unique in that while most developing countries have education systems that favor men, women have a higher educational attainment rate than men do. In secondary education there are 1.6 women for every man, which is the highest ratio in the world for female education attainment. There have been concerted efforts from the Lesotho government since 2000 to encourage female education and nation-wide literacy, dedicating the highest percentage of their GDP to education of any country in the world. They succeeded with a women's literacy rate of 95% (the men's rate is 83%). While this is an accomplishment, according to the UNESCO Global Partnership for Girls’ and Women’s Education, much of the progress in women's educational attainment can be correlated to male immigration to South Africa due to economic hardship. The 1.6 ratio is more reflective of a society in which women outnumber men in the general population than of significant progresses in education.

Some remaining problems in women's education include high dropout rates, lower school performance, and expense. According to UNESCO, "In 2009, 25% of girls at primary level and 64% at secondary level were out of school." Additionally, while in 2000 women outperformed men in math and other sciences, by 2010 the STEM performance gap flipped to favor men.

=== Economics ===
For decades, Lesotho's economy has struggled with high unemployment, falling household income, and about 60% of the population living below the national poverty line. Historically, women in Lesotho have been involved in the informal economy. While restricted to the domestic sphere, they were contributors to the national economy in industries like agriculture, animal herding and cottage-industry manufacturing. However, over time women have begun to enter the formal workforce in higher numbers. Female unemployment in 2017 was about 30%, which is higher than the all-time low of 26% in 2012. However, it is a part of a general downward trend from the 1990s where female unemployment peaked at 48.48%. In 2017, women made up approximately 47% of the workforce. According to a report from the United Nations Conference on Trade and Development, women make up the majority of the highly skilled workforce. The economy of Lesotho was historically, and still is, based in subsistence agriculture, however there has been a significant rise in textile manufacturing.

==== Entrepreneurship ====
When Lesotho published their National Strategic Development Plan 2012–2017, one of the key factors for development was growth of the small business sector. The increase of women as small business owners is also a key part of their gender development plan, built in conjuncture with the Women's Entrepreneurship Development and Gender Equality Project (WEDGE). The Norwegian government also is involved in this project, with the goal to:

"Create an enabling environment that is supportive to growth of women owned businesses; build the institutional capacity of agencies involved in women's entrepreneurship development and gender equality, such as the capacity of Business Development Service (BDS) Providers and partners to enable delivery of more and better services to women; and develop tools and support services for women entrepreneurs to improve their productivity so as to grow more productive GOWER businesses...."

While this is not the case in other parts of Africa, such as Uganda and Cameroon, women are underrepresented in small business ownership in Lesotho. In 2008, 17% of small businesses were owned by women. The majority of women-owned small businesses were in the retail sector, followed by service sector, with few in the industry and agro-processing sectors. Men were the owners of the largest small businesses surveyed, while women were more likely to own "survivalist enterprises." Although there has not been comprehensive survey data since the passage of the Legal Capacity of Married Persons Act of 2008 and The Lesotho Bank Savings and Development Act of 2008, the restrictions on women's economic freedom before these acts is thought to contribute to their lack of small business ownership. Women's Entrepreneurship Development and Gender Equality Project was a major player in the passage of these acts, with the goal of improving gender equality in business environments.

==== Garment industry ====
The largest private employer in Lesotho is now the textile and garment industry, which contributes 20% of the GDP. The industry has become increasingly prevalent following the African Growth and Opportunity Act, promising favorable trade agreements with the United States. There are approximately 36,000 Basotho working in textiles factories, and many of these employees are women. The garment industry provides a higher minimum wage then the average income, and there has been an influx of labor laws to protect women in the industry from sexual harassment and unsafe work environments. However, according to the labor rights non-profit Better Work, Lesotho workers reported discrimination based on ethnic origin, favoring Basotho people rather than migrants. Workers also reported discrimination against pregnant women, who said "“once they see your tummy growing, they send you home on unpaid leave.” There is also reported sexual harassment and discrimination from predominantly male supervisors towards female subordinates. This is exacerbated by the segregation of genders by position, with women predominantly working in "unskilled and labor-intensive" jobs, aligning with cultural interpretations of female capacity.

Approximately 42.7% of garment industry workers are HIV positive. However, the garment industry has played a large role in preventing the spread of AIDs to female employees.

=== Health and Fertility ===
In 2017, the maternal mortality rate in Lesotho was 487 per 100,000 live births. This is down by almost half from 2004, where the maternal mortality rate in Lesotho was 960 per 100,000 live births, higher than the average of 900 per 100,000 live births in sub-Saharan Africa and more than double the global average of 400 per 100,000. In 2014, 95% of women who gave birth within five years received antenatal care (ANC) at least once. 74% had four or more ANC visits. This marked a slight increase from 2004 and 2009, in which 90 percent and 92 percent respectively received care. One of the biggest improvements in maternal health was an increase in hospital births. In 2014, 78% of women reported delivering with a skilled provider, compared to 59 percent in 2009. 77% of births took place in a health facility, though rural women often give birth at home. However, the maternal mortality rate is still high partially due to the HIV crisis, since in 2015, 13% of maternal deaths were related to AIDS.

The total fertility rate in 2014 was 3.3 per woman in Lesotho, with 3.9 per rural woman and 2.3 per urban woman. The rate of teenage pregnancy was 19% in 2014. Since 2004, there have been a number of programs targeted at family planning and contraceptive prevalence. The contraceptive prevalence rate (CPR) showed a promising steady increase in a number of demographics. The CPR of married women increased from 37 percent in 2004 to 47 percent in 2009 to 60 percent in 2014. Sexually active unmarried women's CPR is even higher, increasing from 48 percent in 2004 to 58 percent in 2009 to 73 percent in 2014. According to the Lesotho Review of Health, "among married women, the most popular methods are injectables (used by 24 percent), male condoms (used by 17 percent), and the pill (used by 14 percent), while among sexually active unmarried women the most commonly used method is the male condom (45 percent)." Even with these gains, however, there are 18 percent of currently married women who have an "unmet need" for family planning services, and 20 percent of unmarried sexually active women.

==== Abortion ====
In Lesotho, abortion is illegal based on common law except in "necessary situations". Necessary is defined by Section 45 of the Penal Code as "conducted by a registered medical practitioner to protect the health of the expectant mother, where the unborn child would have severe mental defects and when the pregnancy is a result of rape or incest." There is both a social, religious and legal stigma to getting an abortion, with 90% of the country identifying as Christian. However, a CNN investigation found that abortions are still performed on a significant portion of the population, and many are attained via social media. Of women admitted to hospitals in Lesotho, 13% are for complications related to illegal abortions. Women seeking or receiving abortions are often arrested.

==== AIDS Crisis ====
Lesotho has the second highest rate of HIV prevalence in the world, with 23.8% of the population infected. This number has been stable since 2005. While HIV incidence is declining from 30,000 new infections in 2005 to 15,000 new infections in 2017, the number of women affected greatly outnumbers the number of men infected. The HIV prevalence of women was 29% compared to 18.7% of men. Sex workers and factory workers are the two groups most likely to have high HIV prevalence, and those groups are mostly made up of women. This could possibly be because of sexual violence, discussed below. Additionally, women are less likely to use condoms. In 2017, condom use among women who had more than two sexual partners in the past twelve months was 54%. The correlated male group reported using condoms 65% of the time.

The prevalence of HIV also correlates with the prevalence of other diseases, such as Tuberculosis. Lesotho has the second highest rate of Tuberculosis incidence in the world, with 788/100,000 people. Late diagnosis is a persistent problem, with only 49% of cases being detected. The treatment success rate is 70 percent for new and relapsed cases. The national prevalence of TB is 3.8 percent, and it is directly correlated to HIV positive status.

== Violence against women ==
Violence against women is a significant problem in Lesotho. An Afrobarometer poll conducted in 2018 showed 25% believe that it is justifiable for a husband to beat his wife. Furthermore, a study from the 2014 Gender Links Violence Against Women showed that 86% of women reported experiencing some kind of violence in their lifetime, and 40% of men reported perpetrating some kind of violence against women. Lesotho has made progress in decreasing the prevalence of violence against women, passing a number of acts designed to protect women from sexual violence and domestic abuse. However, according to one Lesotho Minister of Gender and Youth, Thesele John Maseribane, this problem is difficult to combat due to "a culture of silence and stigmatization associated with the scourge."

Lesotho has one of the highest rates of rape and sexual violence in the world.

The issue of sexual violence against women has been identified as one of the contributors to the AIDS crisis and HIV gender gap. 28% of men and 27% of women believe that women do not have the right to refuse sex. This leaves them without protection from disease, and without control over contraceptive methods.

== Women and government ==
There has been an increase of legislation over the last 20 years targeting gender equality. The government of Lesotho has seen increased women's political representation in government positions. In local government, following the Local Government Election Act of 2004, women were 58% of representative positions in 2005 and 49% in 2011. In the federal government, representation has decreased over time, with women holding 22.5% of the seats in the National Assembly and 22% of minister positions in 2017.

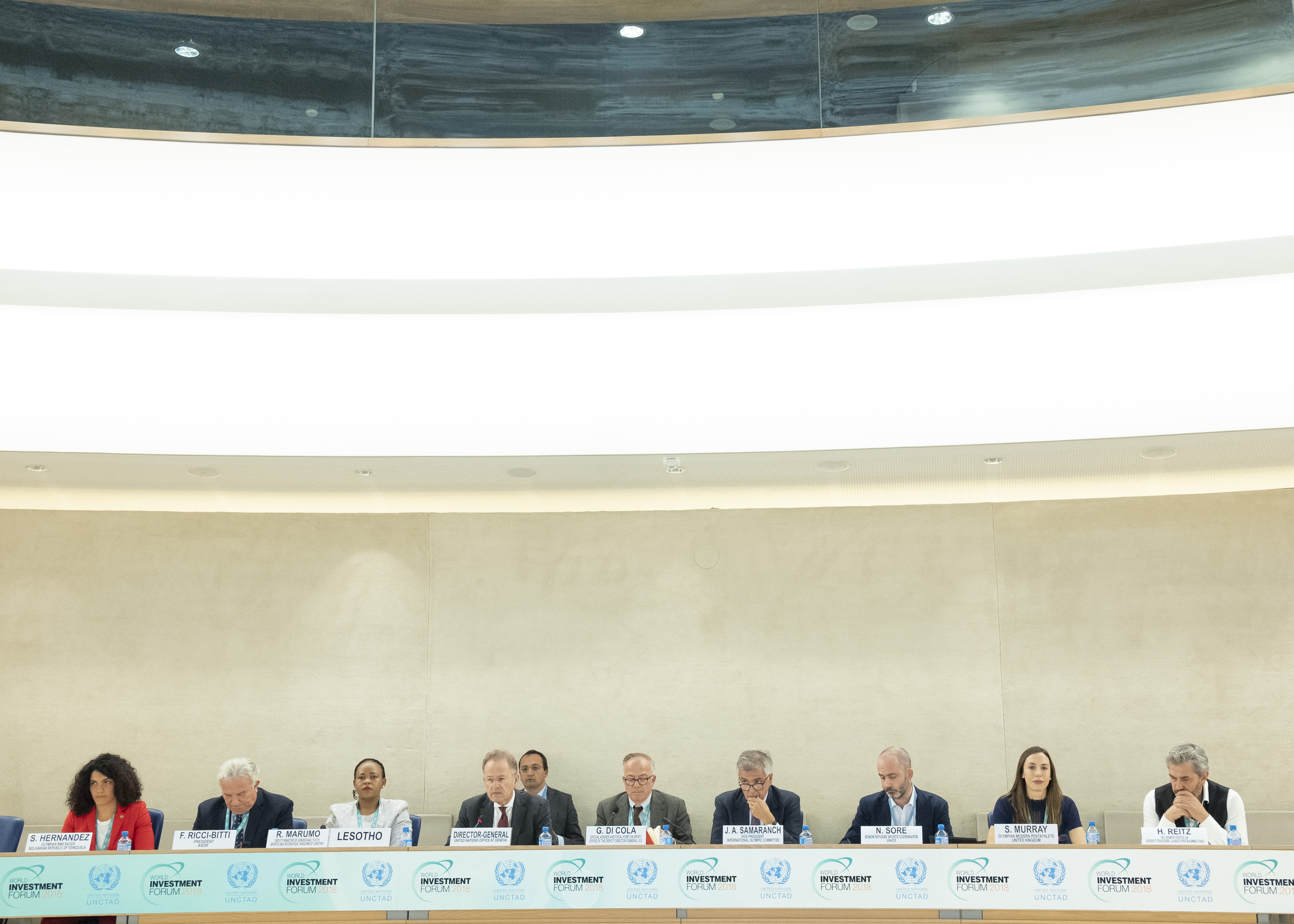
Rethabile Marumo at a meeting of sports ministers

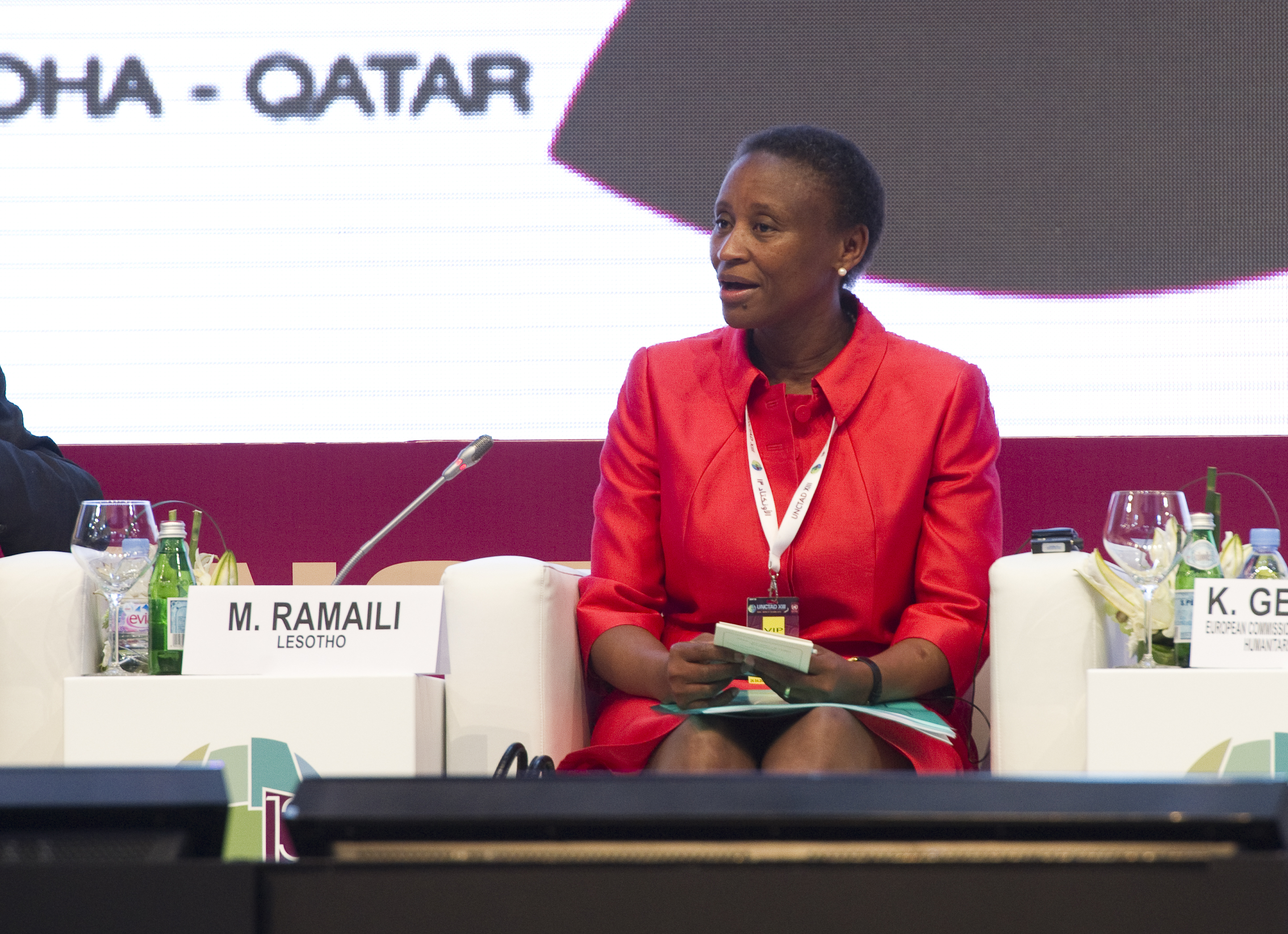
Mannette Ramaili, Minister of Tourism, Environment and Culture of the Kingdom of Lesotho

=== Significant Legislation ===
==== Labour Code Order of 1992 ====
The Labour Code Order criminalized gender discrimination in the work place. This coincided with the rise of the textile industry. It also offered "statutory maternity leave."

==== Sexual Offenses Act of 2003 ====
High percentages of Lesotho women reported experiencing sexual violence. Before 2003, there were few laws standardizing definitions of rape or punishment for rapists. In 2003, the first law was enacted to set strict penalties for rape and incest. It was also the first law to recognize male and marital rape as a crime. According to USAID, the law broadens the definition of rape to include "engaging in sexual relations, which includes the exposure of genitalia, conducting a sexual act in the presence of another and the insertion of animate or inanimate objects into another without their consent, or the ability to give consent in the case of children and the disabled." It also makes it mandatory to report child sexual abuse. Finally, because the law was in part a response to the growing AIDS epidemic, the law mandates the HIV testing of all rapists. If the rapist is found to be HIV positive, and knowingly infected their victim, they are liable to the death penalty, with a minimum sentence of eight years in prison.

To enforce the Sexual Offences Act, Lesotho established the Child and Gender Protection Unit. This unit of the police is dedicated specifically to investigating crimes against children and women.

==== Local Government Election Act of 2004 ====
The Local Government Election Act of 2004 set a political quota for women's seats in local government. One-third of the seats were reserved for women.

==== Electoral Act of 2005 ====
The Electoral Act of 2005 expanded the one third quota to national legislative bodies.

==== Legal Capacity of Married Persons Act of 2006 ====
Before the Legal Capacity of Married Persons Act was passed, women were considered children in the eyes of the law. They were beholden to their husbands in all legal and financial matters. This act abolished married women's minor status, giving them increased women's legal rights, including the right to make medical decisions, enter into a contract, and own property. It also legally established that married partners held equal power within the marriage, allowing women to dispose of joint assets, contract debts using joint assets, and administer their joint estate.

==== The Lesotho Bank Savings and Development Act of 2008 ====
This amendment to the Lesotho Bank Savings and Development Act gave women the right to open their own bank accounts. While the Legal Capacity of Married Persons Act extended this right to married women, the amendment to the Bank Savings and Development Act extended the right to all women.

==== Labour Code Wages Act of 2009 ====
The Labour Code Wages Act of 2009 mandated two weeks of maternity leave for garment employees. However, to be eligible for leave, the woman must be employed by the company for one calendar year.

==== The Anti-Trafficking in Persons Act of 2011 ====
In an effort to combat the growing issue of human trafficking, Lesotho passed the Anti-Trafficking in Persons Act in partnership with the Palermo Protocol of the United Nations. The government of Lesotho still does not meet minimum requirements set by the United States to combat human trafficking, but this legislature was considered a step towards fully addressing the problem. The act "prohibits and punishes all forms of trafficking, and requires protection measures for victims of trafficking, including the establishment of care centers throughout the country and granting new rights to trafficking victims." The act protects victims from persecution for crimes committed while being trafficked, including prostitution and drug offenses. For victims, the act also offers permanent residency to people moved across country borders, and incentivizes victims to testify against perpetrators.

== See also ==
- Women in Africa
