= Mapoteng =

- Community Council
- Geographic Center of Community
- Coordinates: 29°07′08″S 28°01′32″E
- Country: Lesotho
- District: Berea District
- Elevation: 5,210 ft (1,588 m)

Population (2006)
  - Total: 23,926
- Time zone: UTC+2 (CAT)
- Coordinates computed from Lesotho Villages file.

Mapoteng is a community council located in the Berea District of Lesotho. Its population in 2006 was 23,926.

== Villages ==
The community of Mapoteng includes the villages of:

Borakapane
Botsoapa
Ha 'Makhoroana
Ha Arone
Ha Filoane
Ha Hlakolane
Ha Jobo (Mapoteng)
Ha Khotso (Mapoteng)
Ha Lebenya
Ha Lehomo
Ha Macha (Mapoteng)
Ha Mafamolane
Ha Mahlomola
Ha Makhobalo
Ha Makoetje (Lefikeng)
Ha Malima (Mapoteng)
Ha Maloela (Mapoteng)
Ha Malothoane (Lefikeng)
Ha Matube
Ha Mohapi
Ha Mokhachane
Ha Mokhobokoane
Ha Mokone
Ha Molebo (Mapoteng)
Ha Moqachela
Ha Morasenyane
Ha Mosenya
Ha Moshakha
Ha Motjoli
Ha Mpeshe
Ha Mphanya (Mapoteng)

Ha Mphatsoanyane
Ha Nthoba
Ha Ntina
Ha Ntsoso
Ha Phalima
Ha Pitso
Ha Potjo
Ha Qhobosheane
Ha Rachere
Ha Ramaema (Mapoteng)
Ha Ramakoro
Ha Ramohoete
Ha Saba
Ha Sekhahlela
Ha Sekhomo (Mapoteng)
Ha Selebeli (Nokong)
Ha Tebalete
Ha Tsepe
Ha Weeto
Kelekeqe
Khetha
Khohlong
Koma-Koma
Leboteng (Ha Telebate)
Lekhalong
Libakha
Lifotholeng
Likoting (Mapoteng)
Machoaboleng
Makoabating
Mampating

Mapolateng
Marena Mangata
Masaleng (Ha Khomo-Ea-Leburu)
Masenkeng
Masetlaokong
Matlapeng (Ha Ntina)
Mokoallong (Mapoteng)
Mothoba-Pelo
Nokong
Ntširele
Nyareleng
Paballong
Phalole
Phutha
Popopo (Mapoteng)
Sehlabeng
Sehlabeng (Lefikeng)
Sekhutlong
Sekotjaneng
Sentelina
Taung
Taung (Mapoteng)
Taung (Nokong)
Thaba-Chitja
Thabana-Tšooana
Thabong (Mapoteng)
Thota-Tsehla (Mapoteng)
Thoteng (Nokong)
Tlokong (Ha Nthoba)
Tsatsa-Le-Moea
Tsokung

== Healthcare ==
Maluti Adventist Hospital, established in 1951, is a 150-bed hospital.
