= Prince Lerotholi Seeiso =

Heir apparent to the Lesotho throne (born 2007)

- Crown Prince of Lesotho
- Born: Lerotholi David Mohato Bereng Seeiso; 18 April 2007 (age 19); Maseru, Lesotho
- House: Lesotho
- Father: Letsie III of Lesotho
- Mother: Anna Karabo Motšoeneng

Prince Lerotholi Seeiso (born 18 April 2007) is a member of the royal family of Lesotho and the current heir apparent to the throne.

Prince Lerotholi Mohato Bereng Seeiso was born at Maseru Private Hospital in the capital Maseru and is the third child and only son of King Letsie III of Lesotho and Queen 'Masenate Mohato Seeiso. He has two older sisters, the Princesses Senate and 'M'aSeeiso. Prince Lerotholi was named after Lerotholi, the Paramount Chief of Basuto from 1891 to 1905.

Prince Lerotholi was christened as "David" in the Saint Louis Church in Matsieng on 2 June 2007 by Archbishop of Maseru Bernard Mohlalisi, the head of the Catholic Church in Lesotho. The Principal Chief of Likhoele, Lerotholi Seeiso, stood as the Prince's godfather.

In 2025 he was appointed Chancellor of Lerotholi Polytechnic.

== See also ==
- List of current heirs apparent
