= Queen 'Mamohato Memorial Hospital =

Queen ‘Mamohato Memorial Hospital

Geography
- Location: Maseru, Lesotho
- Coordinates: 29°20′36″S 27°32′02.7″E

Organisation
- Type: General hospital

Services
- Beds: 425

History
- Opened: 2011

Links
- Website: {{URL|example.com|optional display text}}
- Lists: Hospitals in Lesotho

Queen ‘Mamohato Memorial Hospital is a hospital campus in Maseru, Lesotho. It is named for 'Mamohato Bereng Seeiso, former regent head of state of Lesotho.

In 2013, Finweek reported that the hospital served more than 1.8 million people. According to a Marketline SWOT analysis, during its second year of operation, the hospital provided healthcare services to 146,549 patients.

The hospital was built in 2011 to replace the then-100-year old Queen Elizabeth II hospital. The hospital was built and administered using both public and private financing (PPP) using a Design-Build-Finance-Operate model. The private consortium that worked with Lesotho's government to run the hospital is called Tšepong Ltd. The consortium was led by Netcare, a South African private healthcare company and also included Afri’nnai of South Africa, and Excel Health, Women Investment, and D10 Investments of Lesotho.

The PPP contract to run the hospital was originally intend to last for 18 years, but was terminated in 2021, approximately five years early.

A 2022 PLOS study evaluating the hospital concluded that healthcare outcomes were "substantially higher" than at the former Queen Elizabeth II Hospital.

== Financial concerns ==
The contract for the hospital was negotiated by the International Finance Corporation (IFC), an arm of the World Bank. The contract was signed in 2009 and was touted as by the IFC as a flagship model for public/private partnerships in Africa. In 2007, Bernard Sheahan, the IFC‘s Director of Advisory Services, said in a press release:

"This project provides a new model for governments and the private sector in providing health services for sub-Saharan Africa and other regions. The PPP structure enables the government to offer high-quality services more efficiently and within budget, while the private sector is presented with a new and robust market opportunity in health services."

For the construction of the hospital, the costs were split between the government of Lesotho (40%), Development Bank of Southern Africa (which is owned by the Government of South Africa) (almost 60%) and Netcare (less than 4%).

In 2012, the terms of the PPP contract were made public. Lesotho's government paid an annual $32.6 million (US) fee to Tšepong Ltd. consortium for a maximum of 20,000 in patient admissions and 310,000 outpatient attendances. If the number of patients served annually exceed these totals, the consortium would bill extra.

Africa Health reported in 2014 that the government of Lesotho was paying $67 million a year to the private consortium, which amounted to over 51% of its annual health budget. Oxfam reported in 2014 that the new hospital was costing the country at least three times what the old public hospital would have cost to run.

In 2014, the private shareholders were set to receive a 25 per cent rate of return on equity, meaning a cash income that was 7.6 times higher than their original investment. The deal was described by Oxfam as a "dangerous diversion of scarce public funds from primary healthcare services in rural areas". In 2016, a review of the contract in the journal Models of public-private engagement for health services delivery and financing in Southern Africa described the contract design as having "serious flaws"

== Labor concerns ==
In the spring of 2014, hospital workers went on strike for more than three weeks. The striking workers sought a pay review, and the strike included, what was described by the Lesotho Country Monitor as, a "violent confrontation with the police".

In 2021, The Reporter published an account of another strike, this time by nurses, who left their posts in February of that year demanding higher pay. The Lesotho Nurses Association reported that nurses at the hospital were paid about 9,000 South African rand a month, compared to nurses at other government-run hospitals, who were paid at least R13,000 a month. In March of 2021, the hospital dismissed 345 nurses and nursing assistants. This move is cited by The Reporter as the "final straw" that ended the contract between the government of Lesotho and Tšepong Ltd.

In a 2024 study by Annals of Global Health, employees expressed dissatisfaction with worker pay. They voiced concerns that the hospital was unable to recruit and retain experienced employees due to low pay.
