= List of football clubs in Lesotho =

This is a list of football clubs in Lesotho. For a complete list see Category:Football clubs in Lesotho

== A ==
- Arsenal (Maseru)

== B ==
- Bantu FC (Mafeteng)
- Butha-Buthe Warriors

== J ==
- Joy (Leribe)

== L ==
- Lerotholi Polytechnic (Maseru)
- Lesotho Correctional Services (Maseru)
- Lesotho Defence Force FC (Maseru)
- Lesotho Mounted Police Service FC (Maseru)
- Lioli FC (Teyateyaneng)
- Linare FC (Leribe)
- Likhopo FC (Maseru)
- Liphakoe (Quthing)

== M ==
- Majantja FC (Mohale's Hoek)
- Maseru Brothers FC (Maseru)
- Matlama FC (Maseru)
- Melele FC (Qacha'nek)
- Mphatlalatsane FC (Maseru)

== N ==
- Nyenye Rovers (Maputsoe)

== Q ==
- Qoaling Highlanders FC (Maseru)

== R ==
- Roma Rovers (Maseru)

== S ==
- Sandawana FC (Makheka)
