= 2016–17 Lesotho Premier League =

Lesotho Premier League
- Season: 2016–17
- Champions: Bantu
- Relegated: Butha-Buthe Warriors; Rovers
- 2018 CAF Champions League: Bantu
- Matches: 182
- Goals: 443 (2.43 per match)
- Biggest home win: Matlama 8-0 Butha-Buthe Warriors (29 January 2017)
- Biggest away win: Butha-Buthe Warriors 1–6 Bantu (21 January 2017)
- Highest scoring: Matlama 8-0 Butha-Buthe Warriors (29 January 2017)
- Longest winning run: Bantu; Kick4Life; LDF; Lioli (4)
- Longest unbeaten run: Bantu (13)
- Longest winless run: Butha-Buthe Warriors (19)
- Longest losing run: Butha-Buthe Warriors (10)
- All statistics correct as of 6 May 2017.

The 2016–17 Lesotho Premier League is the 49th season of top-tier football in Lesotho. The season began on 27 August 2016 and concluded on 6 May 2017. Bantu won their second league title and will represent the Lesotho Premier League in the 2018 CAF Champions League.

The league is comprised 14 teams with the bottom two, Butha-Buthe Warriors and Rovers being relegated to the 2017-18 A Division.

== Teams ==
A total of 14 teams will contest the league, including 12 sides from the 2015–16 season and two promoted from the 2015–16 A Division, Butha-Buthe Warriors and Sky Battalion. On the other hand, Likila United and Mphatlalatsane were the last two teams of the 2015–16 season and will play in A Division for the 2016-17 season. Lioli are the defending champions from the 2015–16 season.

=== Stadiums and locations ===
Locations of the 2016–17 Lesotho Premier League teams

Team	Home city	Stadium	Capacity	2015-16 season
Bantu FC	Mafeteng	Bantu Stadium	1,000	7th in Lesotho Premier League
Butha-Buthe Warriors	Butha-Buthe	Butha-Buthe Field	1,000	A Division
Kick4Life FC	Maseru	Old Europa Ground	1,000	6th in Lesotho Premier League
Lesotho Correctional Services FC	Maseru	LCS-Field	3,000	3rd in Lesotho Premier League
Lesotho Defence Force FC	Maseru	Ratjomose Stadium	1,000	8th in Lesotho Premier League
Lesotho Mounted Police Service FC	Maseru	PTC Ground Europa	1,000	9th in Lesotho Premier League
FC Likhopo	Maseru	LCS-Field	3,000	5th in Lesotho Premier League
Linare FC	Maputsoe	Maputsoe DiFA Stadium	3,000	10th in Lesotho Premier League
Lioli FC	Teyateyaneng	Lioli Football Stadium	1,000	Lesotho Premier League Champions
Liphakoe FC	Quthing	Liphakoe Stadium	1,000	11th in Lesotho Premier League
Matlama FC	Maseru	Pitso Ground	3,000	2nd in Lesotho Premier League
Roma Rovers FC	Roma	Machabeng Stadium	2,000	12th in Lesotho Premier League
Sandawana FC	Maputsoe	Maputsoe DiFA Stadium	3,000	4th in Lesotho Premier League
Sky Battalion FC	Mohale's Hoek			A Division

== League table ==
Pos	Team	Pld	W	D	L	GF	GA	GD	Pts	Qualification or relegation
1	Bantu (C, Q)	26	19	5	2	50	13	+37	62	2018 CAF Champions League
2	Lioli	26	19	3	4	49	11	+38	60	
3	LCS	26	13	8	5	38	21	+17	47	
4	Kick4Life	26	13	6	7	42	28	+14	45	
5	Sky Battalion	26	12	5	9	33	27	+6	41	
6	LDF	26	10	9	7	28	21	+7	36 (Note: LDF and Matlama were each docked 3 points for causing the abandonment of their matches against Bantu and Lioli, respectively.)	
7	LMPS	26	8	12	6	23	20	+3	36	
8	Matlama	26	9	11	6	38	25	+13	35	
9	Sandawana	26	7	10	9	25	29	−4	31	
10	Liphakoe	26	7	7	12	22	33	−11	28	
11	Linare	26	6	9	11	35	38	−3	27	
12	Likhopo	26	3	8	15	20	38	−18	17	
13	Rovers (R)	26	3	8	15	22	51	−29	17	Relegation to A Division
14	Butha-Buthe Warriors (R)	26	1	3	22	18	88	−70	6	Relegation to A Division

Updated to match(es) played on 6 May 2017. Source: soccerway.com
Rules for classification: 1) points; 2) goal difference; 3) goals scored
(C) Champions; (Q) Qualified for the phase indicated; (R) Relegated

== Positions by round ==
Leader
Relegation to Lesotho A Division

Team ╲ Round	1	2	3	4	5	6	7	8	9	10	11	12	13	14	15	16	17	18	19	20	21	22	23	24	25	26
Bantu	1	2	2	3	4	4	4	2	3	3	5	3	3	1	1	1	2	1	1	1	1	1	1	1	1	1
Lioli	10	8	5	4	3	1	2	3	2	1	1	1	1	2	2	2	3	3	2	2	2	2	2	2	2	2
LCS	10	7	6	6	6	7	8	9	10	6	4	6	5	4	4	4	4	4	4	4	4	4	5	4	4	3
Kick4Life	2	1	1	1	2	2	1	1	1	2	2	2	2	3	3	3	1	2	3	3	3	3	3	3	3	4
Sky Battalion	4	3	7	8	5	5	6	5	5	5	6	7	6	5	6	5	5	5	5	6	5	5	4	5	5	5
LDF	7	9	9	9	9	9	9	7	8	9	9	9	8	9	9	10	10	9	9	9	9	8	8	7	6	6
LMPS	4	6	4	2	1	3	3	6	6	7	7	5	4	6	5	6	6	6	6	5	6	6	6	6	8	7
Matlama	3	5	8	7	8	8	5	4	4	4	3	4	7	7	7	7	7	7	7	7	7	7	7	8	7	8
Sandawana	7	9	10	11	12	12	10	10	9	10	10	10	9	8	8	8	8	8	8	8	8	9	9	9	9	9
Liphakoe	4	3	3	5	7	6	7	8	7	8	8	8	10	11	10	9	9	10	10	10	10	11	11	11	10	10
Linare	10	11	13	10	10	10	11	13	11	11	11	11	11	10	11	11	11	11	11	11	11	10	10	10	11	11
Likhopo	14	13	12	12	11	11	12	12	13	13	13	13	13	13	13	13	13	13	13	12	12	13	13	13	13	12
Rovers	13	12	11	13	13	13	13	11	12	12	12	12	12	12	12	12	12	12	12	13	13	12	12	12	12	13
Butha-Buthe Warriors	9	14	14	14	14	14	14	14	14	14	14	14	14	14	14	14	14	14	14	14	14	14	14	14	14	14

Updated to match(es) played on 6 May 2017. Source: Soccerway
