= 2019–20 Lesotho Premier League =

Lesotho Premier League
- Season: 2019–20
- Champions: Bantu
- Champions League: Bantu

The 2019–20 Lesotho Premier League was the 52nd season of the Lesotho Premier League, the top-tier football league in Lesotho, since its establishment in 1970. The season started on 14 September 2019, and was suspended in March 2020 due to the COVID-19 pandemic in Lesotho, before being abandoned on 16 July. Bantu were declared champions, and no teams were relegated.

== Standings ==
Final table.

| Pos | Team | Pld | W | D | L | GF | GA | GD | Pts | Qualification or relegation |
|---|---|---|---|---|---|---|---|---|---|---|
| 1 | Bantu (Mafeteng) | 18 | 16 | 2 | 0 | 45 | 7 | +38 | 50 | Champions |
| 2 | Matlama (Maseru) | 18 | 9 | 7 | 2 | 31 | 12 | +19 | 34 | |
| 3 | LCS (Maseru) | 19 | 9 | 6 | 4 | 18 | 13 | +5 | 33 | |
| 4 | LMPS (Maseru) | 19 | 9 | 4 | 6 | 19 | 13 | +6 | 31 | |
| 5 | Lioli (Teyateyaneng) | 19 | 8 | 4 | 7 | 23 | 20 | +3 | 28 | |
| 6 | Lifofane (Botha Bothe) | 18 | 7 | 6 | 5 | 16 | 16 | 0 | 27 | |
| 7 | Linare (Hlotse) | 18 | 7 | 5 | 6 | 20 | 15 | +5 | 26 | |
| 8 | LDF (Maseru) | 19 | 7 | 5 | 7 | 26 | 27 | −1 | 26 | |
| 9 | FC Kick 4 Life | 19 | 6 | 5 | 8 | 16 | 24 | −8 | 23 | |
| 10 | Likhopo (Maseru) | 18 | 4 | 8 | 6 | 18 | 22 | −4 | 20 | |
| 11 | Liphakoe (Quthing) | 18 | 3 | 8 | 7 | 13 | 20 | −7 | 17 | |
| 12 | Sefothafotha (Maseru) | 19 | 3 | 6 | 10 | 11 | 20 | −9 | 15 | |
| 13 | Lijabatho (Morija) | 18 | 2 | 7 | 9 | 13 | 23 | −10 | 13 | |
| 14 | Swallows (Mazenod) | 18 | 1 | 3 | 14 | 7 | 44 | −37 | 6 | |

Source: rsssf.com

== Stadiums ==
| Team | Location | Stadium | Capacity |
|---|---|---|---|
| Bantu FC | Matefeng | Leshoboro Seeiso Sports Complex | 7,000 |
| Matlama FC | Maseru | Pitso Ground | 20,000 |
| Lesotho Correctional Services FC | | | |
| Lesotho Mounted Police Service FC | Maseru | PTC Ground Europa | 1,000 |
| Lioli FC | Teyateyaneng | Lioli Football Stadium | 3,000 |
| Lifofane | | | |
| Linare FC | Hlotse | Hlotse Stadium | 1,000 |
| Lesotho Defence Force FC | Maseru | Ratjomose Stadium | 1,000 |
| Kick 4 Life | | | |
| FC Likhopo | Maseru | LCS-Field | 3,000 |
| Liphakoe FC | Maseru | Setsoto Stadium | 20,000 |
| Sefothafotha | | | |
| Lijabatho | | | |
| Swallow | | | |
| Lobamba | | | |
| Mhlume Peacemakers F.C. | | | |
