= 2024–25 Lesotho Premier League =

Lesotho Premier League
- Season: 2024-25
- Champions: Lioli FC (7th title)
- Relegated: ACE Maseru; Mzamane
- Champions League: Lioli FC
- Matches played: 464
- Goals scored: 588 (1.27 per match)
- Best Player: Sihle Maso
- Top goalscorer: Makara Ntaitsane (20 goals)
- Best goalkeeper: William Huni
- Biggest home win: Majantja FC 8-0 Ace Maseru (15 December 2024)
- Biggest away win: Liphakoe 0-8 Bantu FC (30 November 2024)
- Highest scoring: Bantu FC 8-1 Ace Maseru FC (11 January 2025); Mzamane FC 1-8 LMPS FC (23 November 2024)
- Longest winning run: 7 — Matlama FC
- All statistics correct as of 18 May 2025.

The 2024–25 Lesotho Premier League was the 57th season of the Lesotho Premier League, the top-tier football league in Lesotho, since its establishment in 1970. The season started on 21 September 2024, and concluded on 24 May 2025. Lioli defended their title to win the league for the seventh time.

== Table ==
Pos	Team	Pld	W	D	L	GF	GA	GD	Pts	Qualification or relegation
1	Lioli (C, Q)	30	22	5	3	55	15	+40	71	Qualification for 2025-26 CAF Champions League
2	Matlama	30	19	8	3	63	27	+36	65	
3	LDF	30	19	5	6	60	22	+38	62	
4	Bantu	30	19	4	7	66	34	+32	61	
5	LCS	30	17	3	10	41	20	+21	54	
6	Lijabatho	30	15	8	7	45	24	+21	53	
7	LMPS	30	13	9	8	47	34	+13	48	
8	Lifofane	30	12	9	9	33	29	+4	45	
9	Majantja	30	9	11	10	36	28	+8	38	
10	Linare	30	10	7	13	31	28	+3	37	
11	Manonyane	30	8	8	14	24	46	−22	32	
12	Machokha	30	6	10	14	20	37	−17	28	
13	LU	30	5	8	17	28	47	−19	23	
14	Liphakoe	30	4	6	20	16	62	−46	18	
15	ACE Maseru (R)	30	2	9	19	25	72	−47	15	Relegation
16	Mzamane (R)	30	4	2	24	14	79	−65	14	Relegation

Source: rsssf.com
(C) Champions; (Q) Qualified for the phase indicated; (R) Relegated
