= 2017–18 Lesotho Premier League =

Lesotho Premier League
- Season: 2017–18
- Champions: Bantu FC

The 2017–18 Lesotho Premier League is the 50th season of top-tier football in Lesotho. The season began on 2 September 2017 and ended on 19 May 2018.

== Standings ==
Final table.

Pos	Team	Pld	W	D	L	GF	GA	GD	Pts	Qualification or relegation
1	Bantu (Mafeteng)	24	17	5	2	45	16	+29	56	Champions
2	Lioli (Teyateyaneng)	24	14	6	4	40	19	+21	48	
3	LDF (Maseru)	24	12	7	5	34	19	+15	43	
4	Matlama (Maseru)	24	12	6	6	32	22	+10	42	
5	LCS (Maseru)	24	11	7	6	31	16	+15	40	
6	FC Kick 4 Life	24	11	6	7	36	22	+14	39	
7	LMPS (Maseru)	24	8	9	7	24	23	+1	33	
8	Majantja (Quthing)	24	7	8	9	21	26	−5	29	
9	Liphakoe (Quthing)	24	8	3	13	22	33	−11	27	
10	Linare (Hlotse)	24	8	4	12	22	36	−14	25 (Note: 3 points deducted)	
11	Sefothafotha (Maseru)	24	5	9	10	22	36	−14	24	
12	Likhopo (Maseru)	24	4	5	15	18	32	−14	17	
13	Sky Battalion	24	0	3	21	6	53	−47	−3 (Note: 6 points deducted)	Relegated
14	Sandawana (Mpharane)	0	0	0	0	0	0	0	0 (Note: Sundawana (Mpharane) expelled after failing to honour three consecutive matches and relegated automatically; all results annulled)	Relegated

Source: rsssf.com
