= 2015–16 Lesotho Premier League =

Lesotho Premier League
- Season: 2015–16
- Champions: Lioli FC

The 2015–16 Lesotho Premier League was the 2015–16 season of the Lesotho Premier League, the top tier soccer competition in Lesotho. It began on 22 August 2015 and concluded on 12 May 2016.

== Standings ==
Pos	Team	Pld	W	D	L	GF	GA	GD	Pts	Qualification or relegation
1	Lioli (Teyateyaneng)	26	17	8	1	40	11	+29	59	Champions
2	Matlama (Maseru)	26	18	4	4	46	23	+23	58	
3	LCS (Maseru)	26	12	8	6	25	15	+10	44	
4	Sundawana (Mpharane)	26	12	6	8	28	26	+2	42	
5	Likhopo (Maseru)	26	9	10	7	29	22	+7	37	
6	FC Kick 4 Life	26	9	10	7	24	26	−2	37	
7	Bantu (Mafeteng)	26	10	6	10	28	22	+6	36	
8	LDF (Maseru)	26	8	10	8	24	22	+2	34	
9	LMPS (Maseru)	26	6	12	8	26	29	−3	30	
10	Linare (Hlotse)	26	6	8	12	27	32	−5	26	
11	Liphakoe (Quthing)	26	5	10	11	19	31	−12	25	
12	Rovers FC	26	6	7	13	16	28	−12	25	
13	Likila United	26	5	5	16	18	37	−19	20	Relegated
14	Mphatlalatsane (Leribe)	26	4	6	16	21	47	−26	18	Relegated

Source: rsssf.com
