= 2018–19 Lesotho Premier League =

Lesotho Premier League
- Season: 2018–19

The 2018–19 Lesotho Premier League is the 51st season of the Lesotho Premier League, the top-tier football league in Lesotho, since its establishment in 1970. The season started on 15 September 2018.

== Standings ==
Final table.

Pos	Team	Pld	W	D	L	GF	GA	GD	Pts	Qualification or relegation
1	Matlama (Maseru)	26	20	2	4	53	13	+40	62	Champions
2	Bantu (Mafeteng)	26	18	6	2	52	11	+41	60	
3	LCS (Maseru)	26	14	7	5	33	14	+19	49	
4	LDF (Maseru)	26	12	8	6	23	19	+4	44	
5	FC Kick 4 Life	26	11	5	10	29	30	−1	38	
6	LMPS (Maseru)	26	10	7	9	22	19	+3	37	
7	Lioli (Teyateyaneng)	26	11	3	12	28	22	+6	36	
8	Liphakoe (Quthing)	26	9	9	8	25	21	+4	36	
9	Sefothafotha (Maseru)	26	6	12	8	21	26	−5	30	
10	Likhopo (Maseru)	26	9	2	15	21	43	−22	29	
11	Linare (Hlotse)	26	6	8	12	21	30	−9	26	
12	Swallows (Mazenod)	26	5	6	15	17	46	−29	21	
13	Galaxy (Hlotse)	26	5	4	17	16	34	−18	19	Relegated
14	Majantja (Quthing)	26	4	5	17	21	54	−33	17	Relegated

Source: rsssf.com

== Attendances ==
The league average was 682:

#	Club	Average
1	Matlama	2,847
2	Bantu	2,312
3	Lioli	957
4	LCS	613
5	LDF	487
6	Kick 4 Life	412
7	LMPS	392
8	Liphakoe	367
9	Linare	341
10	Likhopo	197
11	Sefothafotha	183
12	Galaxy	162
13	Swallows	156
14	Majantja	121
