= Thapelo Tale =

Lesotho footballer (born 1988)

Personal information
- Full name: Thapelo Tale
- Date of birth: 22 April 1988 (age 38)
- Place of birth: Maseru, Lesotho
- Height: 1.69 m (5 ft 6 1/2 in)
- Position: Striker

Team information
- Current team: Liphakoe

Senior career*
Years	Team	Apps	(Gls)
2007–2011	Likhopo		
2011–2012	Srem	4	(0)
2012–2013	Likhopo	19	(10)
2013–2014	FC Andorra		
2014–2016	Likhopo		
2016–2017	Lioli		
2017–2019	LCS		
2019–2020	Matlama		
2020–	Liphakoe		

International career^{‡}
2008–2019	Lesotho	44	(7)
- * Club domestic league appearances and goals as of 31 August 2019 ‡ National team caps and goals as of 31 August 2019

Thapelo Tale (born 22 April 1988) is a Mosotho footballer who plays as a striker for Liphakoe.

== Club career ==
Tale made his senior debut for Likhopo in 2007. During the following seasons he became among the best strikers in the country, and he became a member of the national team. Usually among the strongest domestic teams, Likhopo failed to win the domestic championship during the period Tale was in the club, and it was only in 2010 that they managed to win the Vodacom Soccer Spectacular. That same year, Tale had his first trial with FK Srem in Serbia, however Likhopo President only wanted to agree to a loan. The following year, in April 2011, Tale went again to Serbia, this time along his national team teammate Nkau Lerotholi, to trials with a top league Serbian club FK Jagodina, however both of them did not stayed in the team, and Tale went back to FK Srem who still wanted to sign him since his previous trial a year earlier.

After confirming his health form and after the agreement between the two clubs was reached, Tale finally joined Srem in late August 2011 making his league debut on September 4 in a match against RFK Novi Sad, already counting for the 4th round of the 2011–12 Serbian First League, the second Serbian tier.

At the end of the season Srem got relegated, and Tale returned to FC Likhopo, but soon after he was back in Europe, this time joining FC Andorra, an Andorran club playing in Spanish football league system.

== International career ==
Tale has been a member of the Lesotho U-17 and U-20 teams.

In 2008, he made his debut for the Lesotho national football team, and since then has made over 40 appearances.

=== International goals ===
Scores and results list Lesotho's goal tally first.

No	Date	Venue	Opponent	Score	Result	Competition
1.	19 June 2009	Trade Fair Ground, Manzini, Swaziland	Swaziland	1–0	1–1	Friendly
2.	15 November 2011	Prince Louis Rwagasore Stadium, Bujumbura, Burundi	Burundi	1–0	2–2	2014 FIFA World Cup qualification
3.	8 July 2013	Arthur Davies Stadium, Kitwe, Zambia	Kenya	2–1	2–2	2013 COSAFA Cup
4.	9 July 2013	Arthur Davies Stadium, Kitwe, Zambia	Botswana	3–3	3–3	2013 COSAFA Cup
5.	14 July 2013	Nkana Stadium, Kitwe, Zambia	Angola	1–1	1–1 (5–3 p)	2013 COSAFA Cup
6.	18 May 2015	Royal Bafokeng Stadium, Phokeng, South Africa	Madagascar	1–0	1–0	2015 COSAFA Cup
7.	10 June 2017	Chamazi Stadium, Dar es Salaam, Tanzania	Tanzania	1–1	1–1	2019 Africa Cup of Nations qualification

== Honours ==
Likhopo

- Vodacom Soccer Spectacular: 2010
