= Mazenod Swallows FC =

Association football club in Lesotho

- Full name: Mazenod Swallows Football Club
- Nickname: Maswaiswai
- Founded: 1931
- Ground: Nyakosoba Ground; Nyakosoba, Lesotho
- Capacity: 1,000
- Manager: Teele Nts'onyana
- League: Lesotho A-Division
- 2024–25: 4th, Southern Stream
- Website: https://www.facebook.com/profile.php?id=100063605836039

Mazenod Swallows FC is a Mosotho football club based in Mazenod that currently competes in the Lesotho Premier League. It is currently managed by former Lesotho international and Swallows player Teele Nts'onyana.

== History ==
The club was founded in 1931. Its biggest honour came in 2003 when it won the now-defunct Buddie Challenge Cup, the country's biggest cup competition at the time. It played in the nation's top-flight league from 2001 to 2011. It was champion of the Lesotho A–Division Southern Stream and promotion play-offs for the 2018/19 season, qualifying to return to the Lesotho Premier League for the 2018–19 campaign. Since returning to the top-flight Swallows FC has struggled financially and is one of the few teams in the league that does not pay players a salary.

== Stadium ==
Swallows FC plays its home matches at the Nyakosoba Ground in Nyakosoba, thirty three kilometers from Mazenod because the club's own venue does not meet Lesotho Football Association requirements for top-flight arenas.

== Domestic history ==
Key

Champion Runners-up 3rd Place

Season	League							Notes
Season	Div.	Pos.	Pl.	W	D	L	Pts.	Notes
2004–05	1st	12th	21	5	8	8	23	
2005–06	1st	10th	27	9	9	9	36	
2006–07	1st	11th	30	8	10	12	34	
2007–08	1st	10th	30	8	9	13	33	
2008–09	1st	12th	30	7	8	15	29	
2009–10	1st	11th	30	10	5	15	35	
2010–11	1st	13th	26	2	7	17	13	Relegated to Lesotho A–Division
2011–12	2nd	Unknown						
2012–13	2nd	Unknown						
2013–14	2nd	7th, Southern	17	7	5	5	26 (-6)	
2014–15	2nd	6th, Southern	9	3	2	4	11	
2015–16	2nd	Unknown						
2016–17	2nd	Unknown						Grand Champion
2017–18	2nd	1st, Southern	18	11	5	2	38	Promoted to Lesotho Premier League
2018–19	1st	12th	26	5	6	15	21	
2019–20	1st	14th	18	1	3	14	6	Seasoned abandoned on 16 March
2020–22	1st	14th	30	6	5	19	23	
