= Basia Makepe =

Mosotho footballer (born 1991)

Personal information
- Full name: Basia Kenneth Makepe
- Date of birth: 4 March 1991 (age 35)
- Place of birth: Hlotse, Leribe, Lesotho
- Height: 1.78 m (5 ft 10 in)
- Position: Centre back

Team information
- Current team: LMPS
- Number: 3

Senior career*
Years	Team	Apps	(Gls)
2011–2013	Joy		
2013–2016	Lioli		
2017–	LMPS		

International career^{‡}
2012–	Lesotho	69	(1)
- * Club domestic league appearances and goals ‡ National team caps and goals as of 17 June 2024

Basia Kenneth Makepe (born 4 March 1991) is a Mosotho footballer who plays as a centre back for Lesotho Premier League club Lesotho Mounted Police Service FC and the Lesotho national team.
