= Lesotho A–Division =

- Organising body: Lesotho Football Association
- Country: Lesotho
- Confederation: CAF
- Level on pyramid: 2
- Promotion to: Lesotho Premier League
- Relegation to: Lesotho B-Division Regional Leagues
- Domestic cup: Independence Cup
- Current champions: Machokha FC (1st title)
- Most championships: Arsenal FC (2)
- Website: Website
- Current: 2026-27

The Lesotho A–Division is the second-tier football league in Lesotho, operating under the auspices of the Lesotho Football Association.

== Organization ==
The league is divided into two streams: Northern and Southern. Teams compete within their respective streams during the regular season. The top four teams from each stream then combine for a playoff tournament to determine which club earns promotion to the Lesotho Premier League.

== Sponsorship ==
Vodacom was a significant sponsor of the league until 2017. The league went without a sponsor until September 2021, when the Lesotho Post Bank signed a three-year deal, including naming rights to the league, now known as the Lesotho Post Bank League. The final-eight play-offs have been sponsored by Nedbank, a financial services provider from South Africa, since 2019.

== List of Champions ==
Season	Northern	Southern	Grand Champion
2008–09	Qalo FC	Bantu United	-
2009–10	Maduma FC	Arsenal FC	Arsenal FC
2010–11	Mpharane Celtics FC	Majantja FC	Qoaling Highlanders FC
2011–12	Unknown		
2012–13	Mphatlalatsane FC	Melele FC	Maduma FC
2013–14	Qalo FC	Kick 4 Life FC	Kick 4 Life FC
2014–15	Rovers FC	Liphakoe FC	Liphakoe FC
2015–16	Unknown		
2016–17	Sefothafotha FC	Majantja FC	Mazenod Swallows FC
2017–18	Galaxy FC	Mazenod Swallows FC	Mazenod Swallows FC
2018–19	Lifofane FC	Lijabatho	Both promoted
2019–20	Abandoned because of COVID-19 pandemic		
2020–22	Galaxy FC	Machokha FC	Machokha FC
2022–23	Limkokwing University	ACE Maseru	Limkokwing University
2023–24	Mzamane	Majantja	Majantja
2024–25	Maroala	Members	Members
