= Katleho Makateng =

Mosotho footballer (born 1998)

Personal information
- Date of birth: 20 September 1998 (age 28)
- Place of birth: Pitseng, Lesotho
- Position: Centre-forward

Team information
- Current team: Richards Bay
- Number: 27

Senior career*
Years	Team	Apps	(Gls)
2017–2020	Litšilo		
2020–2022	Lesotho Defence Force	30	(20)
2022–	Richards Bay	20	(0)

International career^{‡}
2022–	Lesotho	17	(3)
- * Club domestic league appearances and goals ‡ National team caps and goals as of 8 April 2024

Katleho Makateng (born 20 September 1998) is a Mosotho footballer who played for South African Premier Division club Richards Bay. He also plays for Lesotho national team.

== Club career ==
Makateng began his career with local Pitseng side Litšilo FC of the second division. He signed for a club in the Lesotho Premier League for the first time before the 2020–21 season, joining Lesotho Defence Force FC. During his first season in the league, following the COVID-19 pandemic, he scored 20 goals to win the golden boot award and break the previous single-season goal record of 18 held by Mojela Letsie and Motebang Sera. Following the season, he then received the Players’ Player of the Year, Young Player of the Season, and Player of the Season awards at the annual league award ceremony, in additional to the top scorer award.

In July 2022 it was reported that Makateng was a transfer target of newly promoted Richards Bay F.C. and Kaizer Chiefs F.C. of the South African Premier Division. Later that month Richards Bay officially announced his signing. He reportedly joined the club on a two-year deal after Lesotho Defense Force reached an agreement on a transfer fee. After missing the opening match of the season while his paperwork was finalized, Makteng made his league debut and played the first seventy minutes of a 0–0 draw with Marumo Gallants F.C. on matchday two.

== International career ==
Makateng was part of Lesotho's under-20 squad that made it to the final of the 2017 COSAFA U-20 Cup before ultimately falling to South Africa. He made his senior international debut on 8 March 2022 in a warm-up friendly against Eswatini as part of preparation for 2023 Africa Cup of Nations qualification. He went on to appear in both of Lesotho's Preliminary Round matches against the Seychelles and scored his first two senior international goals in the second fixture as Lesotho advanced to the Group Stage. Makteng was then named to Lesotho's squad for the 2022 COSAFA Cup in July of that year. In Lesotho's opening match he scored his country's game-winning goal against Malawi in the 2–1 upset victory.

=== International goals ===
Scores and results list Lesotho's goal tally first.

No	Date	Venue	Opponent	Score	Result	Competition
1.	27 March 2022	Dobsonville Stadium, Soweto, South Africa	Seychelles	1–0	3–1	2023 Africa Cup of Nations qualification
2.	27 March 2022	Dobsonville Stadium, Soweto, South Africa	Seychelles	3–1	3–1	2023 Africa Cup of Nations qualification
3.	6 July 2022	King Zwelithini Stadium, Durban, South Africa	Malawi	2–0	2–1	2022 COSAFA Cup
Last updated 6 July 2022

=== International career statistics ===
As of match played 24 March 2024

Lesotho national team
Year	Apps	Goals
2022	7	3
2023	6	0
2024	4	0
Total	17	3

== Personal ==
Makateng was born and raised in Pitseng in the Leribe District. He is an officer in the Lesotho Defence Force.
