= Liteboho Mokhesi =

Lesotho footballer (born 1985)

Personal information
- Date of birth: 17 May 1985 (age 41)
- Place of birth: Maseru, Lesotho
- Position: Goalkeeper

Team information
- Current team: Matlama FC
- Number: 1

Youth career
- Matlama FC

Senior career*
Years	Team	Apps	(Gls)
- Matlama FC

International career
2014–2016	Lesotho	3	(0)
- * Club domestic league appearances and goals

Liteboho Mokhesi (born 17 May 1985) is a Mosotho footballer who plays as a goalkeeper. He currently plays Matlama FC. He previously played for the Lesotho national football team, and is still eligible to compete in it.

== Youth ==
Primarily, Liteboho started as a midfielder in the youth setup of Matlama FC. At the age of 11, he went to play for FC Likhopo which had just been formed at the time. Even though he was a midfielder, he changed positions to goalkeeper considering the fact that supposing you didn't make the first squad, you were placed in goal. Thereupon, he switched to goalkeeper in those potent circumstances. In his youth, he was in the Lesotho U-12 national team.

== Career ==
Preceding the move to Bantu FC in the 2011–2012 Lesotho Premier League, the Maseru native also played for domestic teams NUL Rovers and Matlama FC as goalkeeper.
