= 2017 Lesotho Independence Cup =

2017 Lesotho Independence Cup is a football tournament of Lesotho. It had 4 participants, the top 4 of 2016–17 Lesotho Premier League: Bantu, Lioli, LCS and Kick 4 Life. Part of the prize money would also donate to school or orphanage that were chosen by the participants.

== Matches ==
=== Semi-finals ===
7 October 2017

Lioli	0–0	LCS
Penalties
	3–5

7 October 2017

Bantu	2–1	Kick 4 Life

=== Third-place match ===
Kick 4 Life	2–1	Lioli

=== Final ===
8 October 2017

Bantu	1–1	LCS
Penalties
	3–1
