= Thabane Sutu =

Mosotho footballer and coach

Personal information
- Place of birth: Maseru, Lesotho
- Position: Goalkeeper

Youth career
- –1988: Arsenal

Senior career*
Years	Team	Apps	(Gls)
1988–1993	Arsenal		
1993–1997	Al Ahly		

International career
1994–1997	Lesotho		
- * Club domestic league appearances and goals

Thabane Sutu is a Mosotho football coach and former player. Sutu began his footballing career in his native Lesotho and later played for Egyptian club Al Ahly. During his time with Al Ahly, Sutu also captained his national team from 1994 to 1997. He is currently the head varsity soccer coach at Louisville Trinity High School, after serving as the goalkeeping coach under head coach James O'Connor at MLS side Orlando City and USL side Louisville City.

== Coaching career ==
In 1998, Sutu officially ended his playing career and returned to Arsenal as a youth coach. However, after several months at his boyhood club, Sutu decided to move to America with his soon-to-be wife and study exercise physiology at the University of Louisville. In 2001, Sutu returned to football as the technical director and coach at the youth level side United 1996 in Louisville. Through his work with the youth club, Sutu was the recipient of Kentucky's Coach of the Year award in 2006 and led his team to a Kentucky state youth championship in 2009. In 2015, Sutu joined Louisville City for its inaugural USL season as the team's goalkeeping coach. After reaching the USL Eastern Conference Final in three consecutive seasons and winning the 2017 USL Championship, Sutu parted ways with Louisville City in the summer of 2018 to join former Louisville City head coach James O'Connor as his goalkeeping coach at Orlando City of Major League Soccer. In August 2018, Sutu was inducted into the Kentucky Soccer Hall of Fame for his work with United 1996 and Louisville City.

== Honours ==
=== Player ===
Arsenal

- Lesotho Premier League: 1989, 1991, 1993
- Lesotho Cup: 1989, 1991

Al Ahly

- Egyptian Premier League: 1993–94, 1994–95, 1995–96
- African Cup Winners' Cup: 1993

=== Goalkeeping coach ===
Louisville City

- USL Cup: 2017
