= Lebohang Thotanyane =

Mosotho politician

Minister of Mining of Lesotho
- In office 2015–2017

Personal details
- Born: Teyateyaneng, Berea District, Lesotho
- Party: Lesotho Congress for Democracy
- Education: University of Cape Town

Lebohang Thotanyana is a Mosotho politician and former Minister of Mining.

He serves as club president of Lioli FC, formerly the chairman of the Lesotho Premier League and second vice-president of the Lesotho Football Association.

== Politics ==
He was appointed by The Leader of Lesotho Congress for Democracy, Mothetjoa Metsing, in 2015 as a Minister of Mining.
