= Maloisane Ramasimong =

South African soccer player

Personal information
- Full name: Peter Maloisane Ramasimong
- Date of birth: 10 May 1990 (age 36)
- Position: Midfielder

Youth career
- Bloemfontein Celtic

Senior career*
Years	Team	Apps	(Gls)
2016–2018	Bantu		
2018–2020	Bloemfontein Celtic	14	(2)
2020–2022	Chippa United	36	(0)
- * Club domestic league appearances and goals as of 1 August 2022

Maloisane Ramasimong (born 10 May 1990) is a South African soccer player who last played as a midfielder for South African Premier Division side Chippa United.

== Club career ==
He played for Bloemfontein Celtic at youth level.

He joined Bantu in 2016, and was the Lesotho Premier League's player of the season for the 2017–18 campaign. He left Bantu in 2018 to join Bloemfontein Celtic on a two-year deal.

He joined Chippa United in September 2020.
