= 2017 Independence Cup =

2017 Independence Cup may refer to:

- 2017 Independence Cup (cricket), a cricket tournament in Pakistan
- 2017 Lesotho Independence Cup, a football tournament in Lesotho
- 2017 Independence Cup (Albania), a football tournament in Albania

== See also ==
- Independence Cup (disambiguation), including tournaments held in 2017
- 2017–18 Independence Cup (Bangladesh), a football tournament in Bangladesh, succeeding 2016 edition and preceding 2018 edition
