= James Madidilane =

South African soccer player and manager

Personal information
- Date of birth: 22 August 1986 (age 40)
- Place of birth: South Africa
- Positions: Defender; midfielder

Senior career*
Years	Team	Apps	(Gls)
–2004/05	Manning Rangers		
2005–2008	Bloemfontein Celtic		
2008–2009	Thanda Royal Zulu		
2009–2010/11	Maritzburg United		
2010/2011	Mpumalanga Black Aces		

International career
2007	South Africa	2	(0)

Managerial career
- 2016–2019: Bantu
- ?–2024: Bantu
- 2024–: Lijabatho
- * Club domestic league appearances and goals

James Madidilane (born 22 August 1986 in South Africa) is a South African former soccer player who later became a manager.

== Career ==
After leaving Bloemfontein Celtic, Madidilane claimed his career started to decline.

In 2016, Madidilane was appointed manager of Bantu in Lesotho, his first appointment as head coach of a senior team. In his three seasons there, he led the club to two league titles before becoming assistant coach of the Lesotho national team.

Madid joined Lijabatho in December 2024, earning the club its first league title in 2025–26.
