= Sepiriti Malefane =

Mosotho footballer (born 1994)

Personal information
- Full name: Sepiriti David Malefane
- Date of birth: 8 August 1994 (age 32)
- Position: Midfielder

Team information
- Current team: Bantu

Senior career*
Years	Team	Apps	(Gls)
2012–2013	Likhopo		
2013–2014	Bloemfontein Celtic	0	(0)
2014–	Bantu		

International career^{‡}
2014–	Lesotho	4	(0)
- * Club domestic league appearances and goals as of 15:48, 29 November 2015 (UTC) ‡ National team caps and goals as of 15:48, 29 November 2015 (UTC)

Sepiriti David Malefane (born 8 August 1994) is a Mosotho international footballer who plays for Bantu as a midfielder.

== Career ==
Malefane has played for Likhopo, Bloemfontein Celtic and Bantu.

He made his international debut for Lesotho in 2014.
