= Litšilo FC =

Lesotho football club

- Full name: Litšilo Football Club
- Founded: 1980
- League: Lesotho A–Division
- 2022: 3rd, Northern Stream
- Website: https://www.facebook.com/Litsilo-Football-Club-Pitseng-415804815454883

Litšilo FC is a Mosotho football club based in Pitseng that currently competes in the Lesotho A–Division. The club was founded in 1980.
