= Motheo Mohapi =

Mosotho footballer (born 1968)

Personal information
- Full name: Motheo Mohapi
- Date of birth: 8 August 1968 (age 58)
- Place of birth: Lesotho
- Position: Midfielder

Senior career*
Years	Team	Apps	(Gls)
- Lesotho Defence Force

International career^{‡}
1995–2000	Lesotho		

Managerial career
- 2006–2007: Lesotho
- 2023– 2026: Lioli FC
- 2026– present: Bantu FC (2026–)
- * Club domestic league appearances and goals ‡ National team caps and goals as of 10:57, 22 December 2009 (UTC)

Motheo Mohapi (born 8 August 1968) is a Mosotho football manager and a current head coach of Bantu FC. He played as a midfielder. He played for the Lesotho national football team between 1995 and 2000.

From 2006 until March 2007, he coached the Lesotho national football team.
