= Roma FC =

Roma FC may refer to:

- A.S. Roma, professional Italian association football club based in Rome.
- Dallas Roma F.C., amateur American association football club based in Dallas, Texas.
- Roma Rovers FC
- Viking Roma FC
