= Kananelo Boloetse =

Activist

- Born: 28 March 1989 (age 37); Ha Ramasabata, Mafeteng, Lesotho
- Education: Bachelor of Marketing, National University of Lesotho
- Alma mater: National University of Lesotho
- Occupations: Journalist, editor, activist
- Organization: Media Institute of Southern Africa (MISA) Lesotho
- Title: Former Chairperson
- Term: 2023–2026

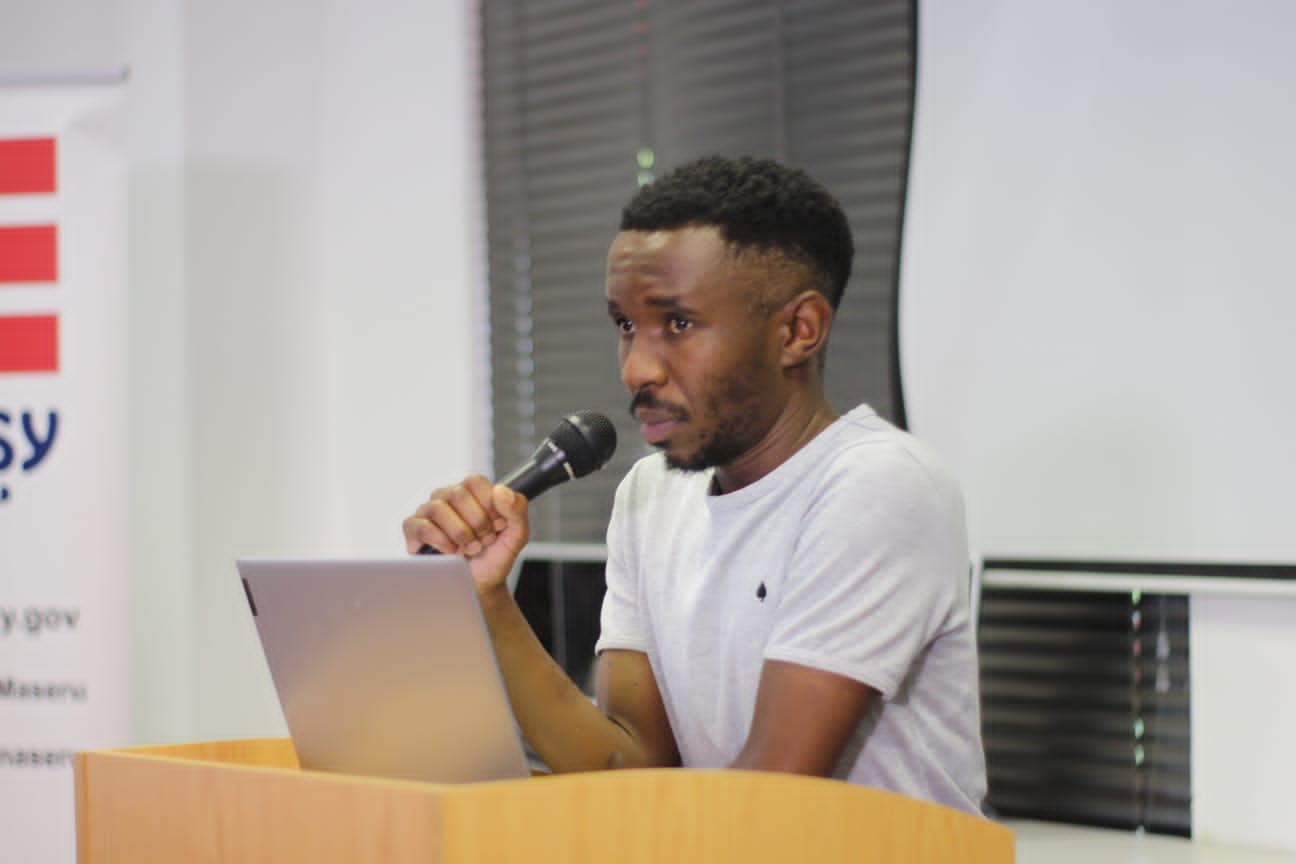
Kananelo Boloetse in Maseru, Lesotho in November 2022

Kananelo Boloetse (born 28 March 1989) is a Lesotho journalist, editor, and activist. He served as Chairperson of the Media Institute of Southern Africa (MISA) Lesotho chapter from 2023 until 28 March 2026, when his three-year tenure ended at the organisation’s Annual General Meeting. He previously served as Deputy Chairperson from 2020 to 2023. He was born at Ha Ramasabata village in the Mafeteng district in Lesotho where he grew up with two brothers. He went to school at St John's High School and studied Bachelor of Marketing at the National University of Lesotho (NUL) where he graduated in 2012. Boloetse's achievements as a journalist have been remarkable considering he did not study journalism but was trained in-house at Public Eye newspaper in Maseru having initially joined the company in the marketing department. He is an International Visitor Leadership Program (IVLP) alumnus. He participated in the IVLP on Edward R. Murrow Program for Journalists in an age of Disinformation from November 23 to December 18, 2020. Boloetse is driven by the need to protect and promote the rights of others, especially the marginalized segment of society. He always, with remarkable determination and consistency, associates with the poor and participates in their struggles that defy unjust laws. Boloetse rose to prominence as an activist in 2018 when he wrote to Lesotho communications Authority (LCA) asking it to order Econet Telecom Lesotho (ETL) and Vodacom Lesotho (VCL) to stop charging expensive out-of-bundle rates for data when customers' data bundles get depleted. He was described by the South African newspaper Mail & Guardian in June 2021 as a journalist and human right activist.

Another South African newspaper, News24, describes him as a media activist. Less favourable portraits paint him as a "mere journalist of meagre resources with no financial wherewithal".

In August 2021, Boloetse and two others were arrested by police in Maseru and accused of inciting violence and disturbing public peace. Boloetse and the two others were released the same day. He was arrested because it was believed he was organising a protest march to Lesotho's National Assembly to petition the leader of the house, Deputy Prime Minister Mathibeli Mokhothu, to revoke regulations which entitled Members of Parliament (MPs) to M5,000 monthly petrol allowances.

In August 2022, Boloetse together with the Law Society of Lesotho Vice President Advocate Lintle Tuke, challenged the state of emergency declared by the Prime Minister of Lesotho Dr Moeketsi Majoro arguing that there was no calamity or disaster in Lesotho that warranted declaration of a state of emergency. The High Court then ruled the state of emergency evoked in August as well as the reconvening of Parliament by King Letsie III were null and void. The court also ruled that all laws passed by the recalled parliament were null and void. The government appealed the Constitutional Court judgment arguing that the court had erred in interrogating the merits that informed the declaration of the state of emergency. The Appeal Court, on November 12, 2022, upheld the decision of the Constitutional Court issued on September 12, 2022, that found the state of emergency declared by the government in August 2022 unconstitutional.

On December 7, 2022, Boloetse and another local activist wrote a letter of complaint to the Central Bank of Lesotho (CBL) complaining about what they said were restrictive and unscrupulous business practices by VCL Financial Services and Lesotho commercial banks. They wanted the central bank to instruct VCL Financial Services to allow citizens to make direct deposits into someone else's M-Pesa account and impose monetary penalties on commercial banks in case their ATMs remained out of cash for a certain number of hours in a month.

On January 3, 2023, Boloetse and other two activists wrote to the Council of State asking it to advise His Majesty King Letsie III to appoint a tribunal to investigate whether the Independent Electoral Commission (IEC)’s commissioners are still fit to hold office.

On 5 September 2026, Boloetse was abducted from his home in Katlehong, Maseru and was interrogated about his work before being assaulted and threatened with death. He was later abandoned in Thaba Bosiu.
