= Top 8 =

Top 8 may refer to:

- AFL final eight system - Aussie Rules football competition
- KPL Top 8 Cup - Kenyan Top 8 football competition
- Mascom Top 8 Cup - Botswana Top 8 football competition
- MGC Supa 8 - Lesotho Top 8 football competition
- MTN 8 - South African Top 8 soccer competition, previously called the BHP Top 8 and SAA Super 8

== See also ==
- Playoff format
