= 2026–27 Lesotho Premier League =

Lesotho Premier League
- Season: 2026-27

The 2026–27 Lesotho Premier League is the 59th season of the Lesotho Premier League, the top-tier football league in Lesotho, since its establishment in 1970. The season started in September 2026, and will be concluded in May 2027. Lijabatho are the defending champions after winning their title for the first time in the 2025–26 season.

== Sponsorship ==
Stanlib sponsored the league for M250,000, with the man of the match for each game receiving M1,000.
