= Luciano Matsoso =

Lesotho footballer (born 1994)

Luciano Matsoso (born 31 July 1994) is a Mosotho footballer who last played as a midfielder or winger for Lioli.

== Early life ==
Matsoso was born in 1994 in Maseru, Lesotho, and moved to South Africa at the age of five. He started playing football at a young age.

== Club career ==
In 2017, he signed for Polish side Oskar Przysucha, where he was regarded to have stood out with his good performances and received offers from higher Polish sides. In 2018, he signed for South African side Black Leopards, where he was regarded to have been unable to establish himself and receive consistent playing time. In 2020, he signed for Lesotho side Lioli, where he became the club's highest paid player at the time. He was regarded to have performed poorly for the club. He also had conflict with the club's management due to accommodation issues.

== International career ==
Matsoso was regarded as a "name that is well-known in the national team" and a Lesotho prospect. He was regarded ton have performed well at the 2018 COSAFA Cup. In 2021, he retired from the Lesotho national football team.

== Style of play ==
Matsoso mainly operates as a winger or attacking midfielder.

== Personal life ==
Matsoso has been nicknamed "Messi" after Argentina international Lionel Messi.
