= Butha-Buthe Warriors =

Lesotho association football team

- Full name: Butha-Buthe Warriors
- Ground: Butha-Buthe Field
- Capacity: 1,000
- Manager: Thoo Letšaba
- League: Lesotho A-Division

Butha-Buthe Warriors is a Lesotho football club based in the town of Butha-Buthe.

In 2016/17 Butha-Buthe Warriors played in the Lesotho Premier League, but were relegated with the worst points total in a decade, winning only one game all season. They currently play in Lesotho A-Division North Stream.
