= Butha-Buthe =

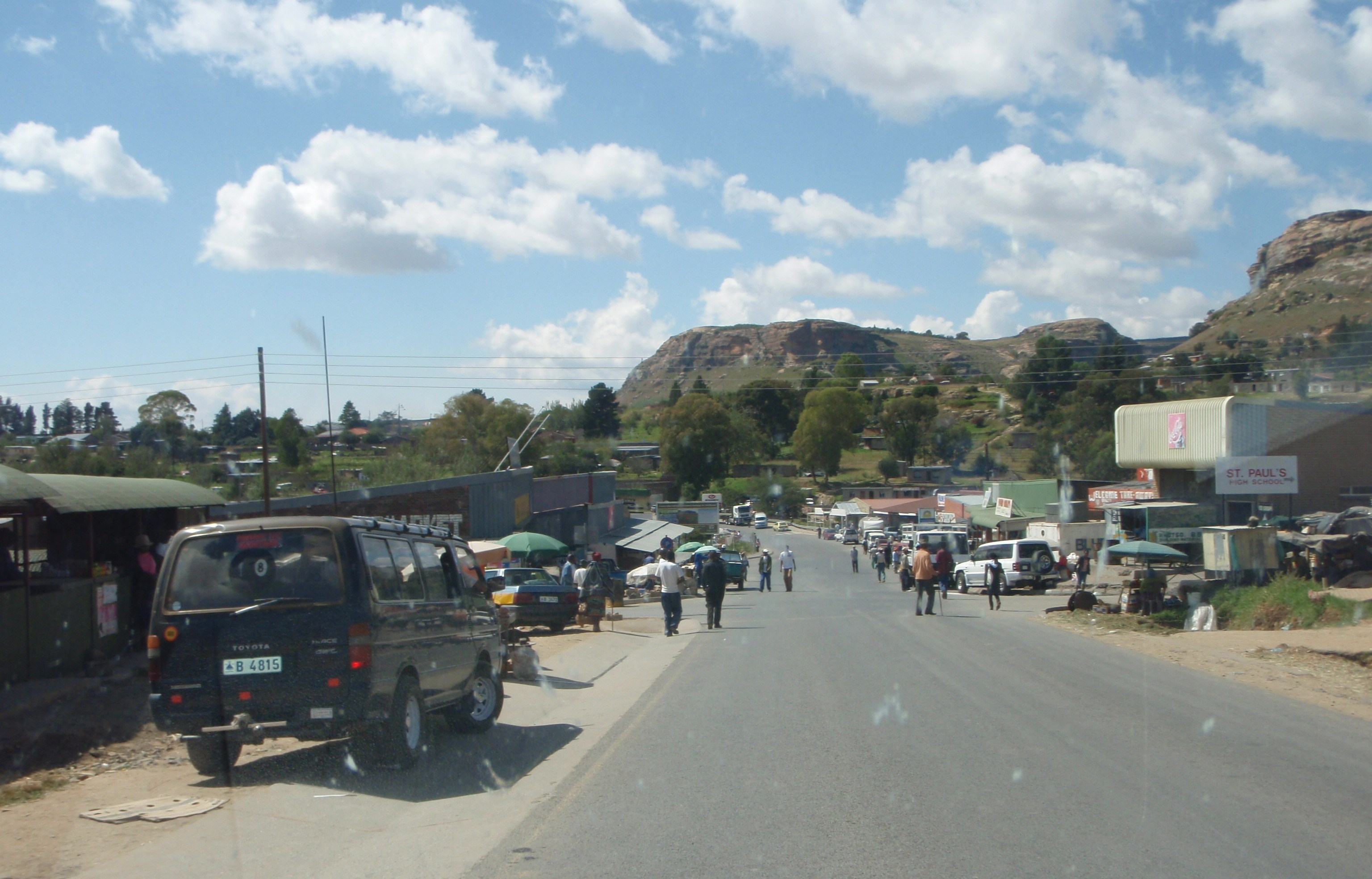
- Main Street of Butha-Buthe

- Location in Lesotho
- Coordinates: 28°47′S 28°14′E
- Country: Lesotho
- District: Butha-Buthe District
- Constituency: Butha-Buthe

Population (2016 census)
  - Total: 35,108
- Time zone: UTC+2 (SAST)
- Postal Code: 400
- Climate: Cwb

Butha-Buthe is the capital or camptown of the Butha-Buthe District in Lesotho. It had a population of 35,108 (2016 census). It is named for Butha-Buthe Mountain to the north of the town. Its name means "place of lying down."

Butha-Buthe was founded in 1884 in order to provide the local ruler with a place where he could pay taxes, rather than forcing him to the more distant town of Hlotse.

The town has a high school called Bokoro High School. A Canadian organization called Help Lesotho has been assisting the school with their literary skills, helping it to become one of the highest ranked schools for literacy skills out of the schools. Bokoro is twinned with Ridgemont High School in Ottawa.

== Climate ==
Climate data for Botha-Bothe (1981–2010)
Month	Jan	Feb	Mar	Apr	May	Jun	Jul	Aug	Sep	Oct	Nov	Dec	Year
Mean daily maximum °C (°F)	26.5 (79.7)	25.8 (78.4)	24.8 (76.6)	21.9 (71.4)	19.1 (66.4)	16.2 (61.2)	16.3 (61.3)	19.0 (66.2)	22.3 (72.1)	23.6 (74.5)	25.0 (77.0)	26.1 (79.0)	22.2 (72.0)
Mean daily minimum °C (°F)	13.9 (57.0)	13.4 (56.1)	11.1 (52.0)	7.3 (45.1)	2.7 (36.9)	−0.4 (31.3)	−0.7 (30.7)	2.1 (35.8)	6.2 (43.2)	9.5 (49.1)	11.2 (52.2)	12.7 (54.9)	7.4 (45.4)
Average rainfall mm (inches)	122.0 (4.80)	97.9 (3.85)	86.8 (3.42)	47.8 (1.88)	24.0 (0.94)	16.4 (0.65)	4.6 (0.18)	22.2 (0.87)	21.4 (0.84)	60.8 (2.39)	77.2 (3.04)	84.9 (3.34)	666 (26.2)
Average rainy days (≥ 0.5 mm)	11	10	10	6	4	3	1	3	3	8	9	10	78
Source: World Meteorological Organization

== Sport ==
Butha-Buthe is home to the former Lesotho Premier League football team, Butha-Buthe Warriors, who currently play in Lesotho A-Division North Stream.
