= Teele Nts'onyana =

Mosotho footballer (born 1970)

Personal information
- Full name: Teele Nts'onyana
- Date of birth: 22 June 1970 (age 56)
- Place of birth: Lesotho
- Position: Striker

Senior career*
Years	Team	Apps	(Gls)
1996–1998	Mazenod Swallows		
1998–1999	Witbank Aces	20	(1)
1999–2000	Mazenod Swallows	28	(12)
2000–2001	Wits University	8	(3)
2001–2005	Mazenod Swallows		

International career^{‡}
1997–2004	Lesotho	7	(2)
- * Club domestic league appearances and goals ‡ National team caps and goals as of 11:24, 22 December 2009 (UTC)

Teele Nts'onyana (born 22 June 1970) is a Mosotho former footballer who played as a striker. Between 1997 and 2004, he won seven caps and scored two goals for the Lesotho national football team.
