= St. Camillus Centre =

Non-profit illness support for children with AIDS-related illnesses

St. Camillus Centre is a non-profit organization in Mohale's Hoek, Lesotho which provides support to children with AIDS-related illnesses. It was founded in 2002 by Bishop Sebastian Khoarai, and nun Juliana Manele, both members of the Congregation of the Sisters of the Holy Cross.

== History ==
The St. Camillus Centre was established in 2002 as a collaborative effort between the Congregation of the Sisters of the Holy Cross, the Ministries of Health and Agriculture, and NGOs including Irish Aide, to respond to the growing HIV-AIDS crisis in Lesotho.

Ground was broken in early 2014 on a small pasture at the farm that was previously leased to St. Camillus by Khoarai, who retired that year. Construction continued until the end of 2014. The Congregation of the Sisters of the Holy Cross contributed the necessary funding for the construction, bought sheets and blankets for the new beds, and decorating supplies such as paint and plaster. The first 17 children, aged between 12 months and 17 years, and four matrons moved in on 23 December 2014.

== See also ==
- Roman Catholic Diocese of Mohale's Hoek
