= Joy FC =

Association football club in Lesotho

Joy F.C.
- Full name: Joy F.C.
- Ground: TSL Ground, Hlotse, Lesotho
- Capacity: 1,000
- League: Lesotho Premier League

Joy F.C. is a Lesotho football club based in Hlotse, Leribe District.

The team currently plays in Lesotho Premier League.

== Stadium ==
Currently the team plays at the 1000 capacity TSL Ground.
