= Teyateyaneng =

Town in Lesotho

Coordinates: 29°09′04″S 27°44′33″E

Teyateyaneng 'Malifate
- Interactive map of Teyateyaneng
- Country: Lesotho
- District: Berea District
- Established: 1886
- Founder: Chief Masupha
- Elevation: 1,693 m (5,554 ft)
- Demonym: Seoli
- Time zone: Central Africa Time
- Postal code: 200

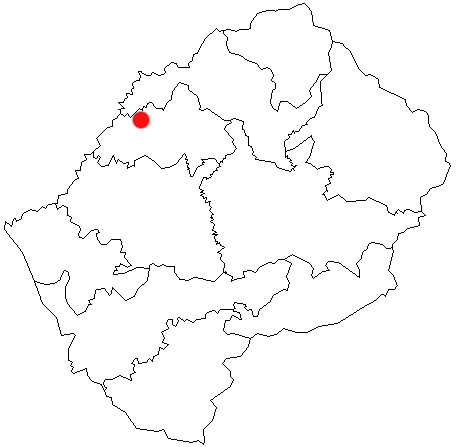
Location of Teyateyaneng in Lesotho

Teyateyaneng is a town located in the district of Berea in Lesotho. Usually abbreviated to T.Y., Teyateyaneng takes its name from the two twin rivers which run on the north (Tebe-tebe River) and the South (Teja-tejana River). Both rivers lead to the Mohokare, or the Caledon River which forms the western boundary with South Africa. They are both named for their vast quantities of sand which means rapid dipping of feet as one crosses them, leading to both names which may well suggest that this is a 'place of quick sands'. Teyateyaneng's name therefore comes from the southern Teja-tejana River, but the name later changed to Teyateyaneng, perhaps due to British influences as the country became a Protectorate in the late 1800s.

The town is situated approximately 400 km south of Johannesburg, 184 km east of Bloemfontein, and 517 km west of Durban, all major metros in the neighbouring South Africa. Teyateyaneng is also the camptown for the district of Berea. In 2005 it had a population of 75,115.

== Geography ==
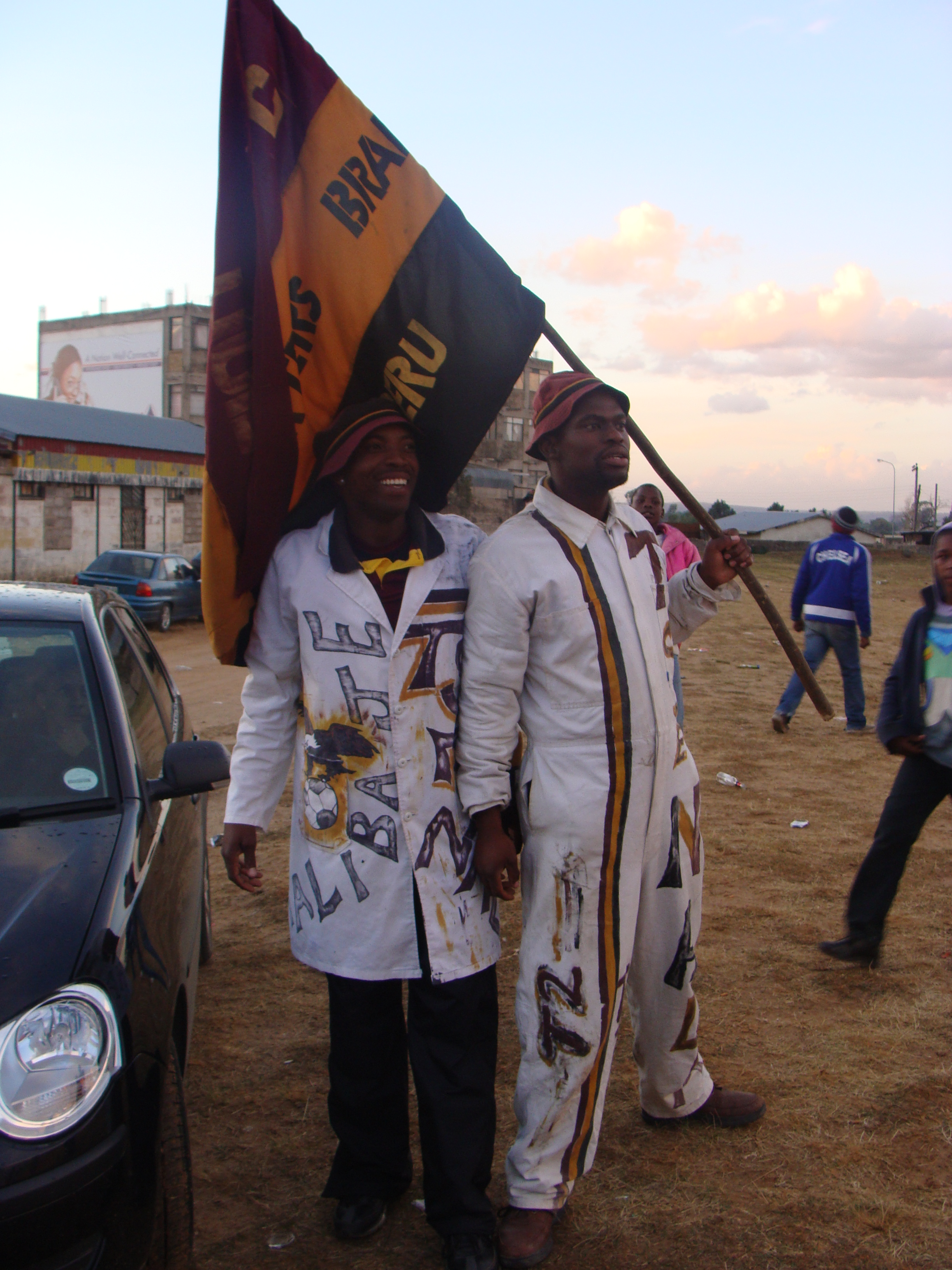

Teyateyaneng is located about 40 kilometers north east of the national capital of Maseru on the Main North I highway, a road that runs parallel to the South African border leading to the northern town of Butha-Buthe. The town is situated on a high plateau at 1,693 meters altitude.

=== Climate ===
Climate data for Teyateyaneng (1981–2010)
| Month | Jan | Feb | Mar | Apr | May | Jun | Jul | Aug | Sep | Oct | Nov | Dec | Year |
|---|---|---|---|---|---|---|---|---|---|---|---|---|---|
| Mean daily maximum °C (°F) | 27.5 (81.5) | 27.0 (80.6) | 25.5 (77.9) | 22.8 (73.0) | 19.7 (67.5) | 17.0 (62.6) | 16.9 (62.4) | 19.4 (66.9) | 23.1 (73.6) | 24.9 (76.8) | 26.1 (79.0) | 27.2 (81.0) | 23.1 (73.6) |
| Daily mean °C (°F) | 21.2 (70.2) | 20.8 (69.4) | 19.1 (66.4) | 15.8 (60.4) | 12.1 (53.8) | 9.1 (48.4) | 8.7 (47.7) | 11.5 (52.7) | 15.3 (59.5) | 17.9 (64.2) | 19.4 (66.9) | 20.7 (69.3) | 16.0 (60.7) |
| Mean daily minimum °C (°F) | 14.8 (58.6) | 14.6 (58.3) | 12.7 (54.9) | 8.8 (47.8) | 4.5 (40.1) | 1.2 (34.2) | 0.4 (32.7) | 3.5 (38.3) | 7.4 (45.3) | 10.8 (51.4) | 12.7 (54.9) | 14.1 (57.4) | 8.8 (47.8) |
| Average rainfall mm (inches) | 118.9 (4.68) | 91.3 (3.59) | 102.8 (4.05) | 46.1 (1.81) | 18.3 (0.72) | 12.6 (0.50) | 1.9 (0.07) | 17.2 (0.68) | 18.6 (0.73) | 71.3 (2.81) | 69.1 (2.72) | 90.9 (3.58) | 659 (25.94) |
| Average rainy days (≥ 0.5 mm) | 12 | 9 | 10 | 6 | 3 | 2 | 1 | 2 | 3 | 8 | 8 | 9 | 73 |
Source: World Meteorological Organization

== History ==
Teyateyaneng was founded in 1886 as the capital of Berea by then Chief Gabasheane Masupha, one of the sons of the nation's founder King Moshoeshoe I. The town is the birthplace of many famous Basotho including the late former Prime Minister Dr. Ntsu Mokhehle, renowned musicians Tshepo Tshola and Sechaba 'Fatere' Litabe, and more recently; accomplished broadcasters such as J-Tagg Tsiame.

== Economy ==
Teyateyaneng has several retail businesses and carpet-producing and tapestry factories, though with little industrial activity overall, perhaps owing to its close proximity to the larger Maseru. The town has remained the country's athletic, art and entertainment capital with many events being hosted here regularly.

== Sports ==
=== Football ===
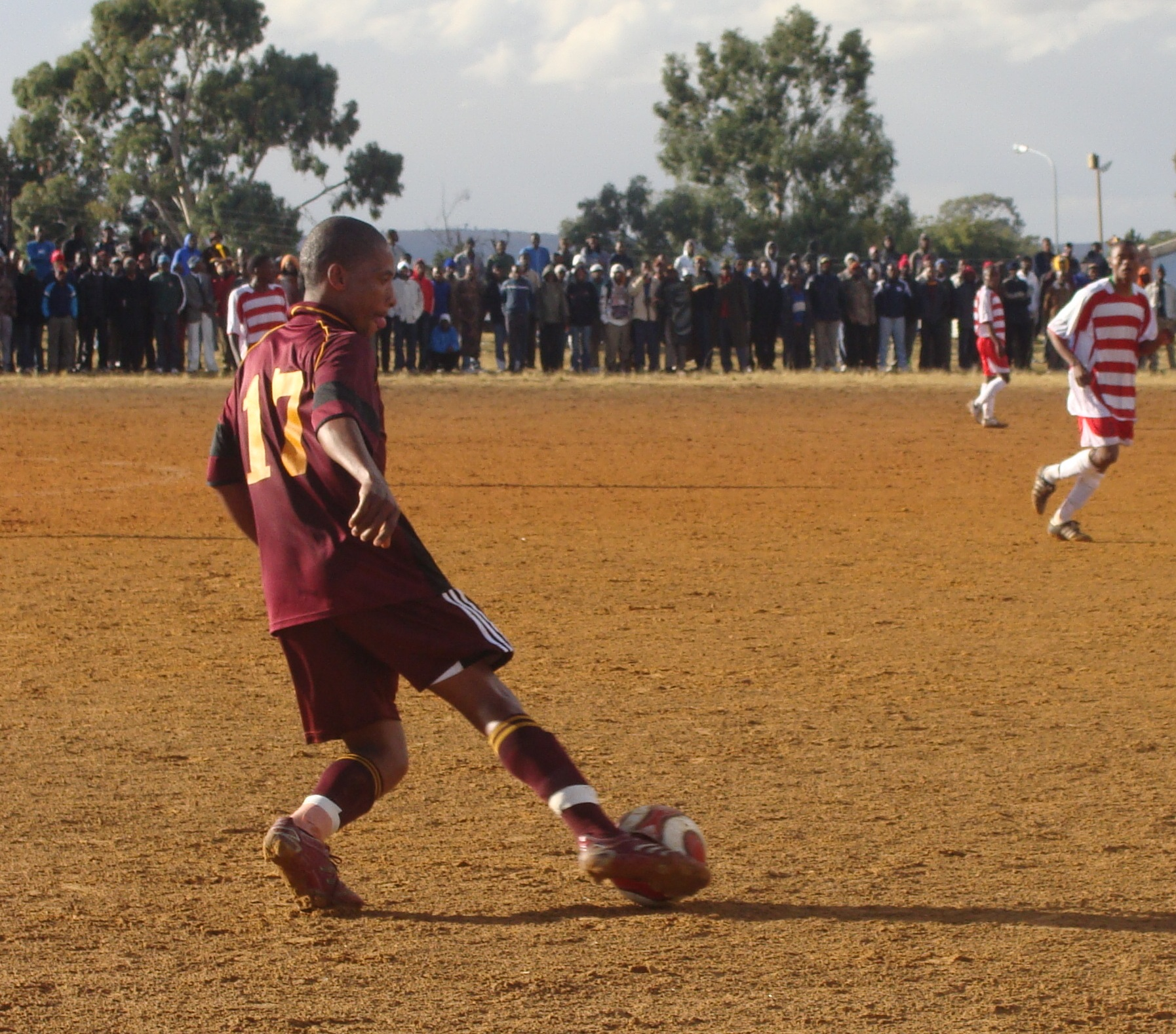
Lioli player

The Lioli Football Club is one of the country's best-known football clubs. The club was founded and is based in Teyateyaneng since 1934. In 1985 the team won the Lesotho Premier League for the first time, but the club's most successful era was in the 2010s when it won league championships in 2009, 2013, 2015, and 2016. The club also won the Lesotho Independence Cup in 1984, 2007, 2010, 2014, and 2016, as well at the MGC Supa 8 Cup numerous other times in the modern era. The team also came second in the league twice in a row in the 2016–17, and 2017–18 seasons.

Unlike many other growing western lowlands towns that have seen an emergence of privately owned clubs over the years, the people of Teyateyaneng have rallied behind the club through the years, taking pride in the iconic identity of the club whose name is synonymous with the town's founding Chief Masupha's regiment "Lioli", named after the red hawk. The club arguably boasts the largest active fan base in Lesotho's premier league today.

=== Cricket ===
The town has proven to be an athletic powerhouse of Lesotho over the years, producing prolific footballers who have represented Lesotho internationally at different levels. In the late 1990s as the country revived the cricket sports, Teyateyaneng further produced many players who rose through high school competitions to represent the country since. Earlier players included the likes of all-rounders Ts'epo 'Muso, Seisa Tsiame, and Ts'epo Lephema among others, before another generation of players such as Leokaoke Lebona, batsman Thabang Mafereka, and pace bowlers Ian Osler and Thabiso Mohapi emerged.

Other sporting disciplines are played at a school level, but football and cricket remain the town's largest sporting quotes.

== Points of interest ==
Teyateyaneng as a district capital has multiple schools, a district referral hospital and several recreational and tourism facilities such as hotels, lodges and cafes. The town is also surrounded by several rock caves with cave paintings of the Khoi San tribes that once occupied the place centuries ago before the Basotho people migrated south to settle in the Mohokare River valley, before ultimately becoming an organized state with inhabitants going further to occupy the mountainous terrain to the east and the south of what is the present day Lesotho.

The Kome Cave Dwellings were built and protected by Chief Teleka of The Basia (cat) Clan in the early 19th century. The town's community can accompany tourists on many hiking trails at request. The town is closer to the country's eastern highlands compared to many of its lowlands neighbours and offers mountain side settlements and cattle posts hiking trails in the east.

== Notable residents ==
- Tšolo Thakeli, human rights activist
