= 2025–26 Lesotho Premier League =

Lesotho Premier League
- Season: 2025-26
- Champions: Lijabatho
- Champions League: Lijabatho
- Matches: 232
- Goals: 530 (2.28 per match)
- Biggest home win: Lioli 5-0 Members
- Biggest away win: Manonyane 1-4 Lijabatho
- Highest scoring: Lioli 5-0 Members; Lifofane 2-3 Lioli; Manonyane 2-3 Lesotho Defence Force
- Longest winning run: Lesotho Defence Force (4 matches)
- Longest unbeaten run: Lesotho Defence Force; Matlama (6 matches)
- Longest winless run: Maroala; Manonyane (12 matches)
- Longest losing run: Maroala (4 matches)
- All statistics correct as of 12 March 2026.

The 2025–26 Lesotho Premier League was the 58th season of the Lesotho Premier League, the top-tier football league in Lesotho, since its establishment in 1970. The season started in September 2025, and concluded in May 2026. Lioli were the defending champions after winning their title for the seventh time in 2024–25 season.

It was won by Lijabatho, who defeated defending champions Lioli to win their first title with a game to spare.

== League table ==
Pos	Team	Pld	W	D	L	GF	GA	GD	Pts	Qualification or relegation
1	Lijabatho (C, Q)	30	19	8	3	63	18	+45	65	Qualification for 2026–27 CAF Champions League
2	Lifofane	30	18	6	6	44	24	+20	60	Qualification for 2026-27 CAF Confederation Cup
3	Bantu	30	17	8	5	51	26	+25	59	
4	Matlama	30	16	10	4	38	22	+16	58	
5	Majantja	30	15	9	6	41	28	+13	54	
6	LDF	30	13	11	6	40	26	+14	50	
7	Lioli	30	13	11	6	37	24	+13	50	
8	Linare	30	13	7	10	42	31	+11	46	
9	LCS	30	12	9	9	31	26	+5	45	
10	LMPS	30	6	15	9	29	30	−1	33	
11	Manonyane	30	5	10	15	34	52	−18	25	
12	Machokha	30	6	6	18	17	39	−22	24	
13	Limkokwing University	30	5	8	17	24	48	−24	23	
14	Members	30	5	7	18	22	55	−33	22	
15	Liphakoe (R)	30	3	12	15	16	40	−24	21	Relegation to 2026–27 Lesotho A–Division
16	Maroala (R)	30	3	5	22	17	57	−40	14	Relegation to 2026–27 Lesotho A–Division

Source: rsssf.com,
Rules for classification: 1) Points; 2) Goal difference; 3) Number of goals scored; 4) Head-to-head results; 5) Wins; 6) Away goals
(C) Champions; (Q) Qualified for the phase indicated; (R) Relegated
