= Lire Phiri =

Mosotho footballer

Personal information
- Full name: Lire Phiri
- Place of birth: Lesotho
- Position: Midfielder

Team information
- Current team: Lesotho Defence Force

Senior career*
Years	Team	Apps	(Gls)
2000–	Lesotho Defence Force		

International career^{‡}
2003–	Lesotho	9	(0)
- * Club domestic league appearances and goals ‡ National team caps and goals as of 10:11, 22 December 2009 (UTC)

Lire Phiri is a Mosotho footballer who currently plays as a midfielder for Lesotho Defence Force. Since 2003, he has won four caps for the Lesotho national football team.

In 2000-01 he was the top scorer in the Lesotho Premier League.
