= Vodacom Soccer Spectacular =

Vodacom Soccer Spectacular is a soccer tournament that was launched by Vodacom Lesotho in 2008 and took place in 2011.

== Description ==
The Vodacom Soccer Spectacular soccer tournament was launched by Vodacom Lesotho in 2008 and took place in 2011. Soccer Spectacular was opened for teams in First division and Premier League teams. The fans voted for their favourite team with the four clubs with the most votes qualifying for the tournament. The total of 36 teams from first division teams and premier league teams to be in the first four will participate in the final knock-out games.

The theme song of the competition was "Vodacom Soccer Spectacular (final)".

== Finalists and results ==
- First Legs

Matlama 3-0 Qalo
Bantu FC 0-0 LCS
Manamela 0-1 LDF
Lioli 1-2 Likhopo

- Second Legs

LDF 3-0 Manamela
Lioli 1-1 Likhopo
Matlama 4-1 Qalo
LCS 2-1 Bantu FC

- Semifinals

Likhopo 1-2 Matlama
LCS 2-0 LDF

- Third Place Match

Likhopo 3-1 LDF

- Final

Matlama 1-0 LCS

== Winners ==
Year	winner	2nd place
2008	LCS (Maseru)	n/a
2009	Matlama FC	LCS (Maseru)
2011	Matlama FC	Bantu FC
