= Independence Cup =

Independence Cup may refer to the following football competitions:

- Independence Cup (Albania), held annually from 2009
- Armenian Cup, held annually from 1992
- Independence Cup (Bangladesh), held annually from 2005
- Brazil Independence Cup, held in 1972 to commemorate the 150th anniversary of the Brazilian Declaration of Independence
- Indonesian Independence Cup, held ten times intermittently since 1985
- Lesotho Independence Cup, held annually from 1985
- Independence Cup (Malta), held annually from 1965, though not in 1967–1968 and parts of the 1970s and '80s
- Zambian Cup, an annual competition called the Independence Cup from 1975 to 1992

== See also ==
- 1997 Pepsi Independence Cup, a quadrangular ODI cricket tournament commemorating the 50th anniversary of the independence of India
- 1998 Silver Jubilee Independence Cup, a One Day International cricket tournament celebrating the 25th anniversary of Bangladesh's independence
- 2017 Independence Cup (cricket), a Twenty20 International cricket tournament in Pakistan
