= Lesotho Football Association =

Governing body of association football in Lesotho

CAF
- Short name: LFA
- Founded: 1932
- Headquarters: Maseru
- FIFA affiliation: 1964
- CAF affiliation: 1963
- COSAFA affiliation: 1997
- President: Salemane Phafane
- Website: https://lefa.co.ls/

The Lesotho Football Association (LeFA) is the governing body of association football in Lesotho, a landlocked country in Southern Africa. It was formed in 1932 and it is based in the city of Maseru. The board helps run the Lesotho national football team as well as domestic competitions such as the Lesotho Premier League, the Lesotho Independence Cup and the Vodacom Soccer Spectacular.

== History ==
Despite been formed in 1932, the Lesotho Football Association did not gain membership of Fédération Internationale de Football Association (FIFA), the world governing body for association football, until 1964. In 1963, LEFA gained membership of the Confederation of African Football (CAF). CAF is the controlling body for African association football and membership of it is required to compete in qualifying for Africa Cup of Nations or the event itself. LEFA is also part of the Council of Southern Africa Football Associations (COSAFA) which acts as an association of football associations for Southern African countries. Lesotho joined COSAFA in 1997 which is the year COSAFA was formed. COSAFA organises the COSAFA Cup, a competition Lesotho has finished runners-up twice.

LEFA runs the Lesotho national football team, whose first international match was a 2–1 win against Malawi in 1970. The Lesotho national team has never qualified for an Africa Cup of Nations or a World Cup but they have competed in multiple COSAFA Cups with the first being the 1999 edition. The national team reached the final of the 2000 COSAFA Cup but lost 6–0 on aggregate to Zimbabwe. LEFA also helps in the running of the Lesotho women's national football team. They played their first international match in 1998 and have since competed in the COSAFA Women's Championship on two occasions. In Lesotho, the Lesotho Premier League is the top domestic football league. The winner of the league qualifies for the CAF Champions League. As of October 2016 the president of LEFA is Salemane Phafane. In February 2022, Lesotho Football Association appointed former Angola and Botswana boss Veselin Jelusic as their new coach.
