= Melele FC =

Melele
- Full name: Melele FC
- Ground: Qacha's Nek Stadium, Qacha's Nek, Lesotho
- Capacity: 1,000
- League: Lesotho Premier League

Melele FC is a Lesotho football club based in Qacha's Nek. It is based in the city of Qacha's Nek in the Qacha's Nek District.

The team currently plays in Lesotho Premier League.

== Stadium ==
Currently the team plays at the 1000 capacity Qacha's Nek Stadium.
