= Mphatlalatsane FC =

Mphatlalatsane
- Full name: Mphatlalatsane FC
- Nickname: Ebolians
- Founded: 1969
- Ground: St. Monica's Primary and Morate High School Stadium, Hlotse, Lesotho
- Capacity: 1,000
- Chairman: Adam Goodes
- Manager: Phil Stubbins
- League: Lesotho Premier League
- 2013–14: 12th

Mphatlalatsane FC is a Lesotho football club based in Leribe. It is based in the city of Leribe in the Leribe District.

The team played in Lesotho Premier League until 2016.

== Stadium ==
Currently the team plays at the 1,000 capacity St. Monica's Primary and Morate High School Stadium.
