= Majantja FC =

Association football club in Lesotho

Majantja
- Full name: Majantja Football Club
- Founded: 1932
- Ground: Mohale's Hoek, Mohale's Hoek, Lesotho
- Capacity: 1,000
- Manager: Ramoshoeu Malapane
- League: Lesotho Premier League
- 2025–26: 5th of 16
Home colours

Majantja Football Club is a professional football club based in Mohale's Hoek (Mohale's Hoek District), Lesotho, that competes in the top tier of Lesotho football known as the Lesotho Premier League. The club was founded in 1932.

The club has been relegated and promoted numerous times.

== Stadium ==
Currently the team plays at the 1000 capacity Mohale's Hoek.

== Sponsorship ==
The team received its first significant sponsorship in September 2024, signing a three-year deal with LNIG-Hollard worth M200,000 annually.

== Honours ==
- Lesotho Premier League winners: 1970–71, 1994–95
- Lesotho A–Division Southern Stream winners: 2016–17 2023–24

== Performance in CAF competitions ==
- 1972 African Cup of Champions Clubs: 2 appearances
- 1996 African Cup of Champions Clubs
