= Nyakosoba =

- Community Council
- Popanyane Mountain seen from A5

- Geographic Center of Community
- Coordinates: 29°30′17″S 27°52′09″E
- Country: Lesotho
- District: Maseru District
- Elevation: 7,156 ft (2,181 m)

Population (2006)
  - Total: 10,893
- Time zone: UTC+2 (CAT)
- Coordinates computed from Lesotho Villages file.

Nyakosoba is a community council located in the Maseru District of Lesotho. Its population in 2006 was 10,893.

== Villages ==
The community of Nyakosoba includes the villages of:

- Aupolasi
- Bolatella
- Ha Chalalisa
- Ha Chere
- Ha Choatlella
- Ha Graffis
- Ha Joele
- Ha Jonase
- Ha Kakae
- Ha Khanyetsi
- Ha Kubutu
- Ha Kutumane
- Ha Lekatanyane
- Ha Lekhooa
- Ha Lelao
- Ha Lepeli
- Ha Leronti
- Ha Leteba
- Ha Letebele
- Ha Mabobola
- Ha Macheli
- Ha Mahleke
- Ha Makafane
- Ha Maoela
- Ha Masireletse
- Ha Mathibeli
- Ha Mofutisi
- Ha Mohlachane
- Ha Mojela
- Ha Moleko
- Ha Molibetsane
- Ha Moloi
- Ha Monyane
- Ha Motsie
- Ha Mpota
- Ha Nchakha
- Ha Ngaka
- Ha Nkoankoa
- Ha Ntahli
- Ha Ntai
- Ha Ntlale
- Ha Ntsane
- Ha Ntsane (Lekhalong)
- Ha Penane
- Ha Petso (Furumela)
- Ha Pitso
- Ha Qhomoqo
- Ha Ralitseko
- Ha Ramothibeli
- Ha Rasemousu
- Ha Sakia
- Ha Sebili
- Ha Sempe
- Ha Sephali
- Ha Setefane
- Ha Suoane
- Ha Thabo
- Ha Thakeli
- Ha Tseko
- Ha Tšomo
- Hloahloeng
- Kanana
- Khubetsoana
- Khumamela
- Koeneng
- Koung
- Likhalaneng
- Likhutlong
- Likoaring
- Likolobeng
- Litenteng
- Litšaneng
- Mantšatlala
- Maphakatlaling
- Masaleng
- Mathuleng
- Mekhukhung
- Ngope-Tšoeu
- Nyakosoba
- Pheuoeng
- Qiloane
- Terai Hoek
- Thota-Peli
- Tiping
- Titimaneng
- Tšana-Talana
- Tšoeneng
