= Qoaling Highlanders FC =

Qoaling Highlanders
- Full name: Qoaling Highlanders
- Ground: Qoaling Ground, Maseru, Lesotho
- Capacity: 1,000
- League: Lesotho Premier League
- 2013–14: 9th

Qoaling Highlanders is a Lesotho football club based in Maseru. It is based in the city of Maseru in the Maseru District.

The team currently plays in the Lesotho A League.

== Stadium ==
Currently the team plays at the 1,000 capacity Qoaling Ground.
