= Roma Rovers FC =

- Full name: Roma Rovers Football Club
- Manager: Pule Khojane
- League: Lesotho Premier League
Home colours	Away colours

Roma Rovers Football Club is a Lesotho football club based in the town of Roma in the Maseru District.

The team currently plays in Lesotho Premier League.

In 1996 the team won the Lesotho Premier League.

== Stadium ==
Currently the team plays at the Machabeng Stadium.

== Fans ==
Most of the Football Club's fans are students attending the National University of Lesotho.

== Honours ==
- Lesotho Premier League: 1996
- Lesotho National First Division Champions: 2015

== Performance in CAF competitions ==
- 1997 CAF Champions League: 1 appearance
