= Pitseng =

- Community Council
- Geographic Center of Community
- Coordinates: 29°00′35″S 28°15′27″E
- Country: Lesotho
- District: Leribe District
- Elevation: 5,505 ft (1,678 m)

Population (2006)
  - Total: 18,948
- Time zone: UTC+2 (CAT)
- Coordinates computed from Lesotho Villages file.

Pitseng is a community council located in the Leribe District of Lesotho. The population in 2006 was 18,948.

== Villages ==
The community of Pitseng includes the villages of Bolahla (Ha Mahloane), Ha 'Makena, Ha 'Mamanka, Ha Botšo, Ha Filipi, Ha Jorotane, Ha Khomoatsana, Ha Khopa, Ha Lota, Ha Mahloane, Ha Majara, Ha Makape, Ha Makateng (Pitseng), Ha Makhata, Ha Miro, Ha Moepi, Ha Mofoka (Masaleng), Ha Mohatonyane, Ha Monate, Ha Mosebo, Ha Motingoe, Ha Mphasa, Ha Mphenyeke, Ha Mpshe (Ha Piletso), Ha Nchee, Ha Nkoana, Ha Ntoere (Pitseng), Ha Ntsebe, Ha Piletso (Mafaleng), Ha Rampesa, Ha Rantšala, Ha Raphoka, Ha Senyokotho, Matlameng, Ha Shekoe, Ha Tau, Ha Tefo, Ha Tjooeng, Hlokoa-Le-Monate, Khoaba-La-Eja-Bohobe, Khoabakhoaba (Pitseng), Lekhalong (Pitseng), Lilibaneng, Lipohong, Litooaneng, London (Pitseng), Phomolong, Pontšeng, Sekoaing, Tiping and Vukazenzele (Pitseng).

== Education ==
Pitseng hosted the Leadership Camp, which was sponsored by the organization Help Lesotho. Pitseng has two schools that are twinned with schools in Canada, also helped by Help Lesotho. The schools in Pitseng are Guardian Angel Primary School and Pitseng High School. They are twinned with Rockcliffe Park Public School, in Ottawa, the capital of Canada (Guardian Angel) and Gulf Islands Secondary School, in Salt Spring Island, British Columbia (Pitseng High). Guardian Angel was the first school in Lesotho to be twinned with a school in Canada. Pitseng is located in the Leribe district. It is under the chieftaincy of Chief Khethisa Tau the son of the late Chief Seoehla Khethisa Tau. There is a Roman Catholic Mission named Pontmain which is run by Sisters of Charity of Ottawa. At present there is another school on the way to Katse dam named after the Great Chief Khethisa and is called Khethisa High School, it is a well performing school under the Lesotho Evangelical Church. This school was established in 1979.
