= Econet Telecom Lesotho =

Telecommunication company in Lesotho

- Industry: Telecommunications
- Headquarters: Maseru
- Products: Telecommunications services; Internet services; Prepaid cellphone prepaid (BUDDIE); Landline telephone service
- Website: www.etl.co.ls

Econet Telecom Lesotho (ETL) is a telecommunications company in Lesotho, co-owned by Econet Global and the Lesotho government. It is one of the two main wireless service providers in Lesotho, alongside Vodacom Lesotho.

ETL was founded in 2000 as a partially-privatized restructuring of the national telecommunications company Telecom Lesotho, co-owned by the Lesotho government (30%) and three companies: Econet Global, Eskom, and Mauritius Telecom. In 2008, Econet Global bought the other companies shares, but the government retained its 30% ownership.

ETL launched 5G wireless in Lesotho in 2024.
