= Lijabatho FC =

Association football club in Lesotho

- League: Lesotho Premier League
- 2025–26: 1st of 16

Lijabatho Football Club is a Lesotho football club based in Morija. The team currently plays in the Lesotho Premier League, and won its first league title in the 2025–26 season.

== History ==
Lijabatho was promoted to the Premier League in 2019 after winning the Southern Stream Division A.

The club received significant investment prior to the 2025–26 season and in January, bringing in high profile coach James Madidilane and the experienced Jane Thabantšo, culminating in the club winning its first title.

== Sponsorship ==
In 2022, the club signed a three-year deal with Metropolitan Lesotho to offer a funeral scheme for its supporters, with some of the monthly revenue going to the club.

== Honours ==
=== League ===
- Lesotho Premier League
  - Winners (1): 2025–26

== League record ==
=== Lesotho Premier League ===
- 2019–20 – 13th
- 2020–22 – 7th
- 2022–23 – 7th
- 2023–24 – 9th
- 2024–25 – 6th
- 2025–26 – 1st
