= Roma, Lesotho =

Roma
- Settlement
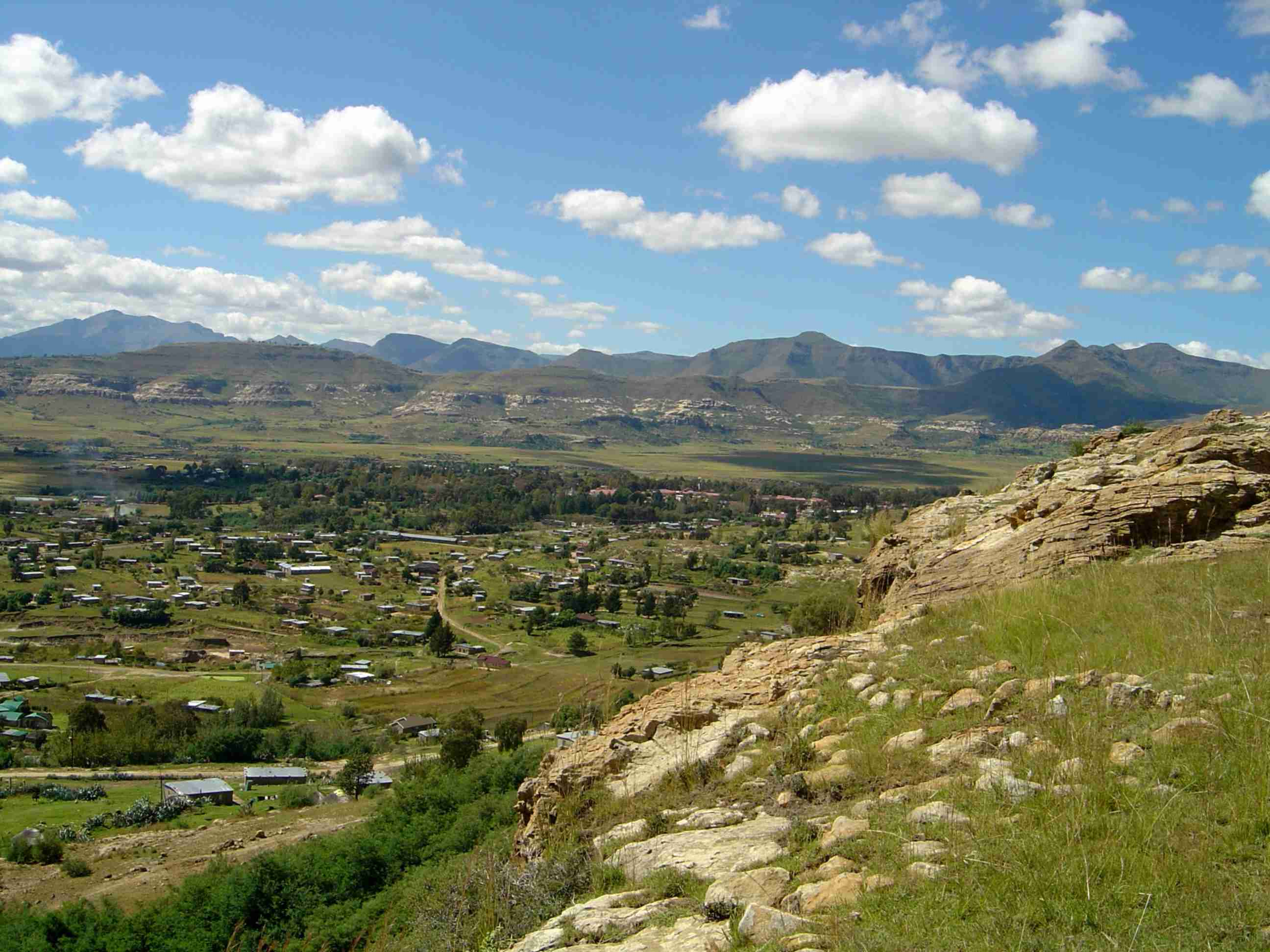
- Roma Valley from Roma Plateau

- Location in Lesotho
- Coordinates: 29°26′48″S 27°42′29″E
- Country: Lesotho
- District: Maseru District
- Elevation: 5,280 ft (1,610 m)
- Time zone: UTC+2 (SAST)

Roma is a settlement under the Manonyane Community Council in the Maseru District of Lesotho, some 34 kilometres southeast of Maseru, the capital of Lesotho. The Roma valley is broad and fertile, and is surrounded by sandstone cliffs topped to the East by basalt mountains which provide magnificent scenery.

== History ==
Founded in 1862 by Roman Catholic missionaries in the valley known as Tloutle, Roma now has three seminaries and various novitiates, and they began the institution that became the National University of Lesotho. The surrounding area has become quite densely populated and is a significant residential area, recently gaining street lights on the main road. There are many dinosaur footprints in the area, some within the National University of Lesotho, and others on Roma Plateau.

Some years ago the US Peace Corps ran its training programmes in Roma, and a local steep prominent mountain, Makhetha, is still referred to as Peace Corps Mountain, as an ascent was traditionally part of their programme.

== Education ==
There are a number of schools situated around Roma, including three high schools. Christ the King High School, a boys school, was initially an early teacher training college, set up by the Marist Brothers, and from 1937 was run by the Brothers of The Sacred Heart. In 1961 CKHS became a high school only. Nearby there is St. Marys High School, which is a girls school, started by the Holy Family Sisters. The third is the NUL International School, situated within the university campus.

== Healthcare ==
There is a hospital, St. Joseph's Hospital, Roma, which is run by a Board under the Archbishop of Maseru, and was opened in 1937. Attached is the Roma College of Nursing, which offers diplomas in Nursing and Midwifery. The hospital services a number of Health Centres in the surrounding Roma Health Area, which has about 114,000 inhabitants, 6% of Lesotho's population, and about twice the area of Maseru Health Area.

== Galleries ==
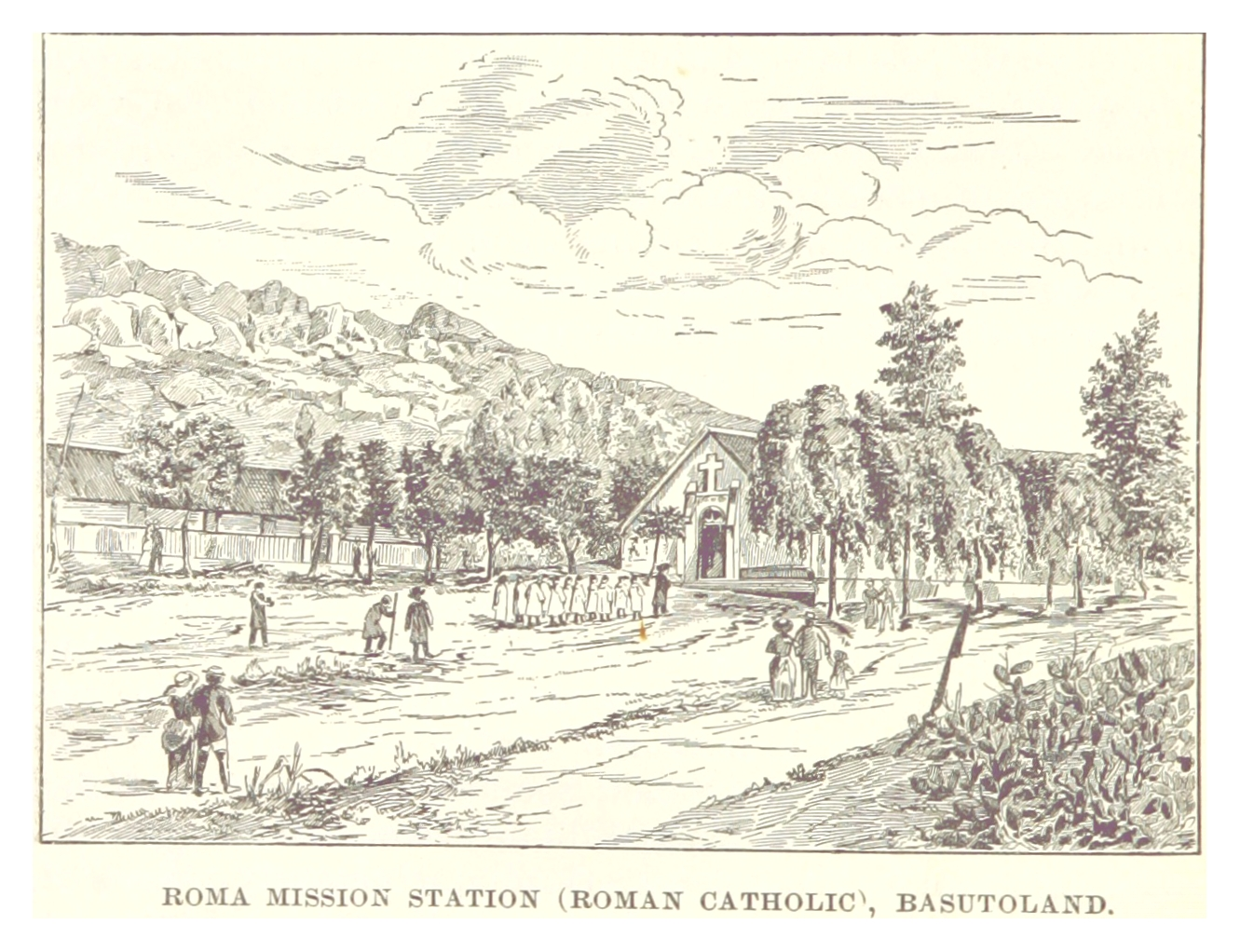
Catholic mission in Roma (1887).
