= MGC Supa 8 =

Football competition

MGC Supa 8 is a football cup between the top 8 teams of the Lesotho Premier League. It is played in Lesotho.

== See also ==
- Football in Lesotho
