= Lesotho Independence Cup =

The Lesotho Independence Cup is an annual knockout football competition in men's domestic football in Lesotho.

== Winners ==
=== Sturrock Cup ===
- 1963 : Bantu FC (Matefeng)
- 1976 : Matlama FC (Maseru)
- 1978 : Maseru United
- 1979 : Matlama FC (Maseru)
- 1980 : Matlama FC (Maseru)
- 1981 : Maseru Rovers
- 1982 : Maseru Rovers
- 1983 : Linare FC (Leribe)
- 1984 : Lioli FC (Teyateyaneng)

=== Independence Cup (Top 4) ===
- 1985 : Lesotho Paramilitary Forces (Maseru)
- 1986 : RLDF (Maseru)
- 1987 : Matlama FC (Maseru)
- 1988 : RLDF (Maseru)
- 1989 : Arsenal (Maseru)
- 1990 : RLDF (Maseru)
- 1991 : Arsenal (Maseru)
- 1992 : Matlama FC (Maseru)
- 1993 : Bantu FC (Mafeteng)
- 1994 : Matlama FC (Maseru)
- 1995 : Maseru Rovers
- 1996 : Lerotholi Polytechnic
- 1997 : Bantu FC (Mafeteng)
- 1998 : Arsenal (Maseru)
- 1999 : Linare FC (Leribe)
- 2000 : RLDF (Maseru)
- 2001–04 not played
- 2005 : LCS (Maseru)
- 2006 : Likhopo (Maseru) and Lioli FC (Teyateyaneng) [match abandoned due to crowd trouble]
- 2007 : Lioli FC (Teyateyaneng) 3–1 LDF (Maseru)
- 2008 : LMPS (Maseru) 0–0 Lioli FC (Teyateyaneng) [3–1 pen]
- 2009 : LMPS (Maseru)
- 2010 : Lioli FC (Teyateyaneng)
- 2011 : Bantu FC (Mafeteng) 3–1 LCS (Maseru)
- 2012 : Bantu FC (Mafeteng) 2–2 LCS (Maseru) [4–3 pen]
- 2013 : Bantu FC (Mafeteng) 1–1 Lioli FC (Teyateyaneng) [4–3 pen]
- 2014 : Lioli FC (Teyateyaneng) 1–1 Matlama FC (Maseru) [12–11 pen]
- 2015 : Bantu FC (Mafeteng) 1–1 Lioli FC (Teyateyaneng) [15–14 pen]
- 2016 : Lioli FC (Teyateyaneng) 1–0 Matlama FC (Maseru)
- 2017 : Bantu FC (Mafeteng) 1-1 LCS (Maseru) [3-1 pen]
- 2018 : Lioli FC (Teyateyaneng) 2-1 Bantu FC (Mafeteng)
- 2019 : Matlama FC (Maseru) 1-0 LCS (Maseru)
