= Arsenal FC (Lesotho) =

Association football club in Lesotho

- Full name: Arsenal Football Club
- Founded: 1983; 43 years ago
- Ground: Setsoto Stadium; Maseru, Lesotho
- Capacity: 20,000

Arsenal Football Club is a soccer club based in Maseru, Lesotho.

== Achievements ==
- Lesotho Premier League: 3

1989, 1991, 1993

- Lesotho Cup: 3

1989, 1991, 1998

== Performance in CAF competitions ==
- African Cup of Champions Clubs: 3 appearances

1990: Second Round
1992: First Round
1994: First Round

- CAF Cup: 1 appearances

1995 – Second Round

- CAF Cup Winners' Cup: 3 appearances

1991 – withdrew in First Round
1993 – Second Round
1999 – Preliminary Round
