= Mohale's Hoek =

Capital of Mohale's Hoek District, Lesotho

Coordinates: 30°09′S 27°28′E

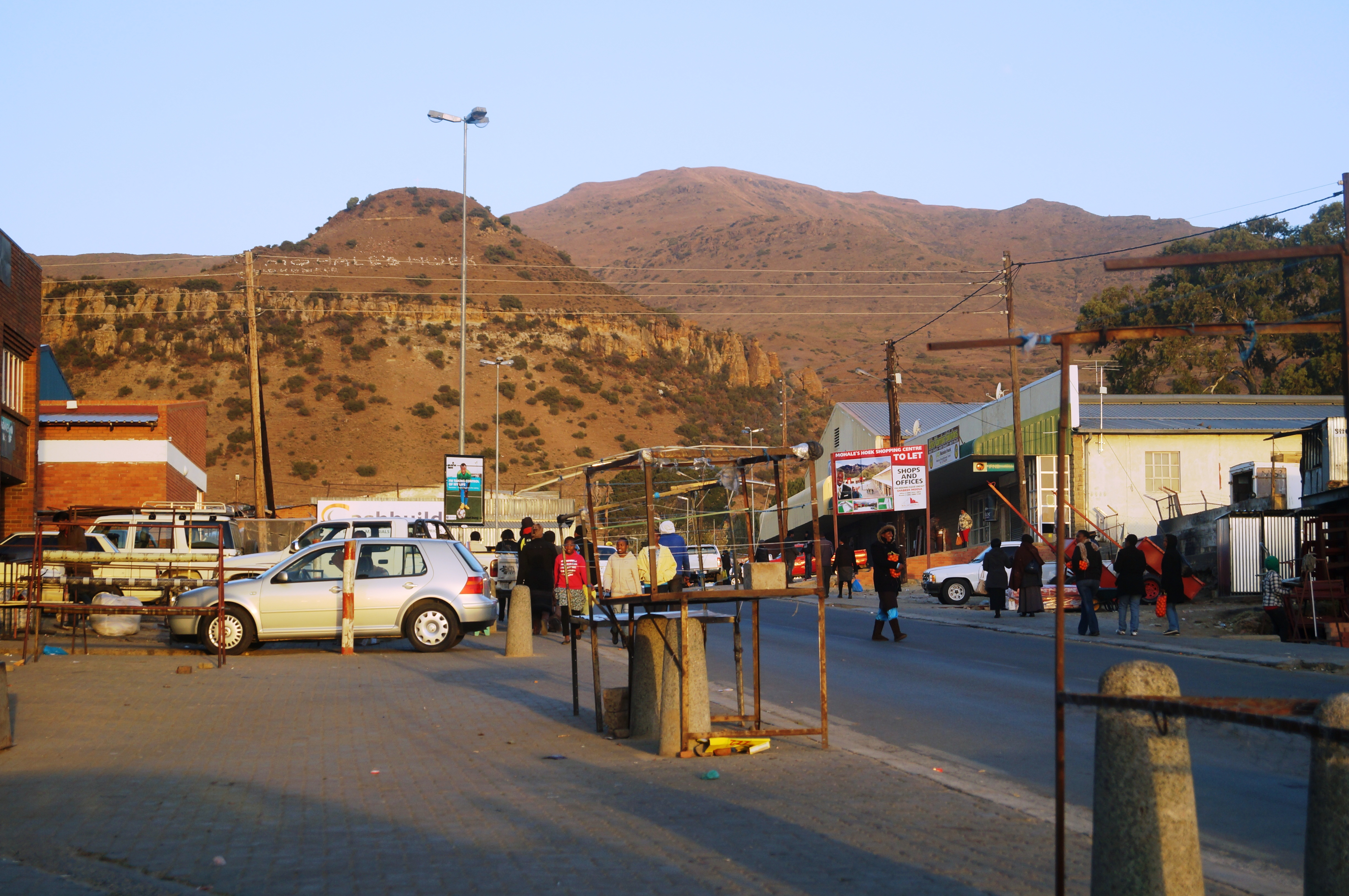
Street in Mohale's Hoek

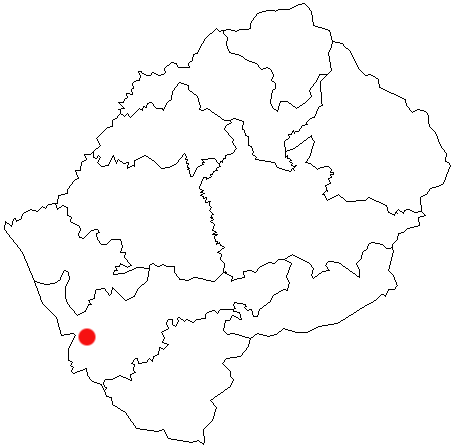
Location of Mohale's Hoek in Lesotho

Mohale's Hoek is the capital city of Mohale's Hoek District in Lesotho. It had a population of approximately 40,040 in 2016.

== History ==
Mohale's Hoek had first been inhabited by the San who were found there by the Baphuthi around 1795. The Baphuthi settled in Kubake, the small mountain fortress shaped like a castle, near the present Likuena High School while some settled at Thaba-Ts'oeu. Chief Moorosi of the Baphuthi is said to have been there during the journey to this new home. They later settled below the foothills of Thaba-Linoha, north of the present Bethesda mission and the area was later called Maphutseng, which simply means the plural of a certain variety of a pumpkin. In singular it is Lephuts'e. This was found in plenty on the fertile bank of Maphuts'eng River. Some Baphuthi inhabited the area bordering Senqu River, Morifi and across the river into what is now Quthing. After 1824, the area was inhabited by Mohale, the younger brother of Moshoeshoe around the 1830s.

On expansion of Moshoeshoe's kingdom into southern Lesotho, King Moshoeshoe sent his brother Mohale to administer the area where the Baphuthi and Basotho enjoyed a rather fragile friendship. After living for a while at Lifateng, Mohale established a substantial village at the place now known as Old Hoek (the present day Ha Ts'epo village) a few kilometres north of the present town. This village was destroyed in 1867 during the Seqiti War and was subsequently abandoned. In the year after the proclamation that made Lesotho British territory, an assistant commissioner was appointed to administer what was then called Cornet Spruit District - after the Makhaleng River. This would make Mohale's Hoek the second oldest of all the district headquarters towns in Lesotho, except that the town was completely destroyed during the Gun War of 1880. Southwest to the town near the St Patrick's Cathedral are the Motlejoeng caves which were used by the celebrated cannibal, Motlejoa during the Lifaqane. The town moved from Old Hoek to the present location because of a certain businessman of an English descent PB Jandrell.

== Climate ==
Climate data for Mohale's Hoek (1981–2010)
Month	Jan	Feb	Mar	Apr	May	Jun	Jul	Aug	Sep	Oct	Nov	Dec	Year
Mean daily maximum °C (°F)	28.3 (82.9)	27.7 (81.9)	25.6 (78.1)	22.1 (71.8)	18.9 (66.0)	15.8 (60.4)	16.2 (61.2)	18.8 (65.8)	22.6 (72.7)	24.2 (75.6)	26.1 (79.0)	27.6 (81.7)	22.8 (73.1)
Mean daily minimum °C (°F)	14.5 (58.1)	14.1 (57.4)	11.8 (53.2)	8.4 (47.1)	4.7 (40.5)	1.3 (34.3)	1.1 (34.0)	3.7 (38.7)	7.1 (44.8)	9.8 (49.6)	11.6 (52.9)	13.4 (56.1)	8.5 (47.2)
Average rainfall mm (inches)	110.0 (4.33)	94.9 (3.74)	96.4 (3.80)	57.2 (2.25)	20.6 (0.81)	16.8 (0.66)	8.9 (0.35)	26.4 (1.04)	31.1 (1.22)	68.5 (2.70)	80.3 (3.16)	98.4 (3.87)	709.5 (27.93)
Average rainy days (≥ 0.5 mm)	10	9	10	6	3	2	1	2	3	7	8	8	69
Source: World Meteorological Organization

== See also ==
- St. Camillus Centre
