= Matlama FC =

Association football club in Lesotho

- Full name: Matlama Football Club
- Nickname: Tse Putsoa
- Founded: 16 May 1932
- Ground: Pitso Ground, Maseru, Lesotho
- Capacity: 20,000
- Chairman: Moeketsi Khojane
- Manager: Halemakale Mahlaha
- League: Lesotho Premier League
- 2025–26: 4th
Home colours	Away colours

Matlama Football Club is a professional football club based in Maseru, Lesotho that competes in the Lesotho Premier League. The club was founded in 1932 and currently play at the Pitso Ground. They often play home games in front of thousands of spectators. Historically, they are the most successful team in the division.

Matlama, along with Lioli and Bantu are one of the three most popular sides in the country.

== History ==
Matlama Football Club was founded on 16 May 1932, making them one of the oldest clubs in the nation. When the Lesotho Premier League was founded in 1970, Matlama was the inaugural winner of the competition. The club have since won the Lesotho Premier League a record 11 times, most recently in 2019 and 2022. In addition, they have won the Lesotho Independence Cup six times, and competed in the preliminary rounds of the CAF Champions League four times.

== Achievements ==
- Lesotho Premier League
  - Champions (12): 1969*, 1974, 1977, 1978, 1982, 1986, 1988, 1992, 2003, 2010, 2019, 2022
- Lesotho Cup
  - Winners (6): 1976, 1979, 1980, 1987, 1992, 1994
- Top 8
  - Winners (incomplete): 2018
- Alliance Challenge Cup
  - Winners (incomplete): 2024
- People's Cup
  - Winners (incomplete): 2024

== Performance in CAF competitions ==
- CAF Champions League: 4 appearances

2004 – Preliminary Round
2011 – Preliminary Round
2020 – Preliminary Round
2022 – Preliminary Round

- CAF Confederation Cup: 0 appearances
