= Liphakoe FC =

Association football club in Lesotho

Coordinates: 30.41083731°S 27.69702137°E

- Full name: Liphakoe Football Club
- Nicknames: The Mighty Hawks, The Maroon and Gold
- Founded: 1940s
- Ground: Setsoto Stadium, Moyeni, Liphakoe FC ground, and other venues including LCS Ground
- Capacity: 20,000
- Chairman: Ramajake Thulo
- Manager: Thabo Tsutsulupa
- League: Lesotho Premier League
- 2025–26: 15th of 16 (relegated)
- Website: http://liphakoefc.co.ls/
Home colours	Away colours

Liphakoe Football Club is a football club based in Moyeni, Quthing District, Lesotho. The club play in the Lesotho Premier League.

== History ==
The club were established in the 1940s and played in the Lesotho Premier League in the 1980s, 1990s and early 2000s before being relegated in 2002. In 2013–14 the club finished as runners-up in the Southern stream of the A Division, narrowly missing out on promotion to the Premier League. However, they won the Top 8 championship, beating Roma Boys 3–2 in the final. The 2014–15 season saw the club won the Southern stream of the A Division, earning promotion to the Premier League.

== Honours ==
- A Division
  - Northern Stream champions 2014–15
  - Top 8 champions 2013–14
