= Linare FC =

Association football club in Lesotho

Linare
- Full name: Linare FC
- Nickname: Mamalente
- Founded: 1931
- Ground: Hlotse Stadium, Hlotse, Lesotho
- Capacity: 1,000
- Chairman: Mr Refiloe Martin
- Manager: Jabulani Mendu
- League: Lesotho Premier League
- 2025–26: 8th of 16
Home colours	Away colours

Linare FC commonly referred to as Tse Tala tsa Mmamosa le Molapo (often stylised as The Greens) or Mamalente, is a Lesotho professional football club based in Leribe in the Leribe District. It was established in 1931 and it has been in the Lesotho Premier Division from the early 1930s to date.

The team currently plays in Lesotho Premier League. Former renowned managers include Teboho Moloi. The club is currently coached by former Kaizer Chiefs star, Jabulani Mendu.

== Stadium ==
Currently the team plays at the 1,000 capacity Hlotse Stadium.

== Titles ==
- Lesotho Premier League: 3

1973, 1979, 1980
