= Hlotse =

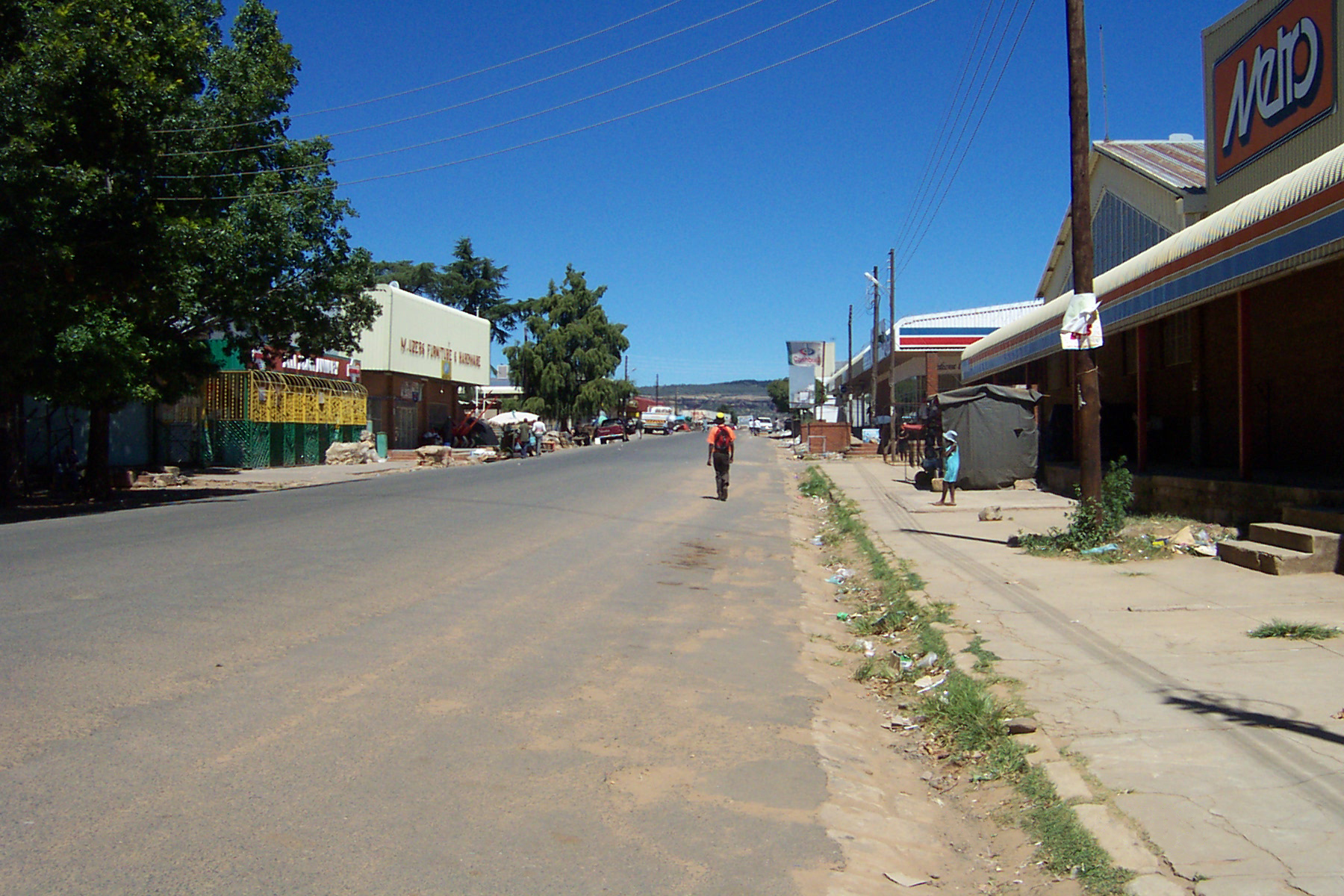
- Downtown Hlotse

- Location in Lesotho
- Coordinates: 28°52′24.1″S 28°02′29.7″E
- Country: Lesotho
- District: Leribe District
- Constituency: Hlotse

Population (2016)
  - Total: 38,558
- Time zone: UTC+2 (SAST)

Hlotse (also Leribe) is an important market town in Lesotho. It is situated on the Hlotse River, near the South African border. The town was founded in 1876 by a British missionary, Reverend John Widdicombe. It was a colonial centre until Lesotho gained its independence. The population in 2016 was 38,558.

The alternate name, Leribe, comes from the adjacent French Protestant Leribe Mission, founded in 1859 by François Coillard. Hlotse is also called Leribe because it is the camptown in the district of Leribe.

The main Basotho headquarters for Help Lesotho is in Hlotse.

== Places of interest ==
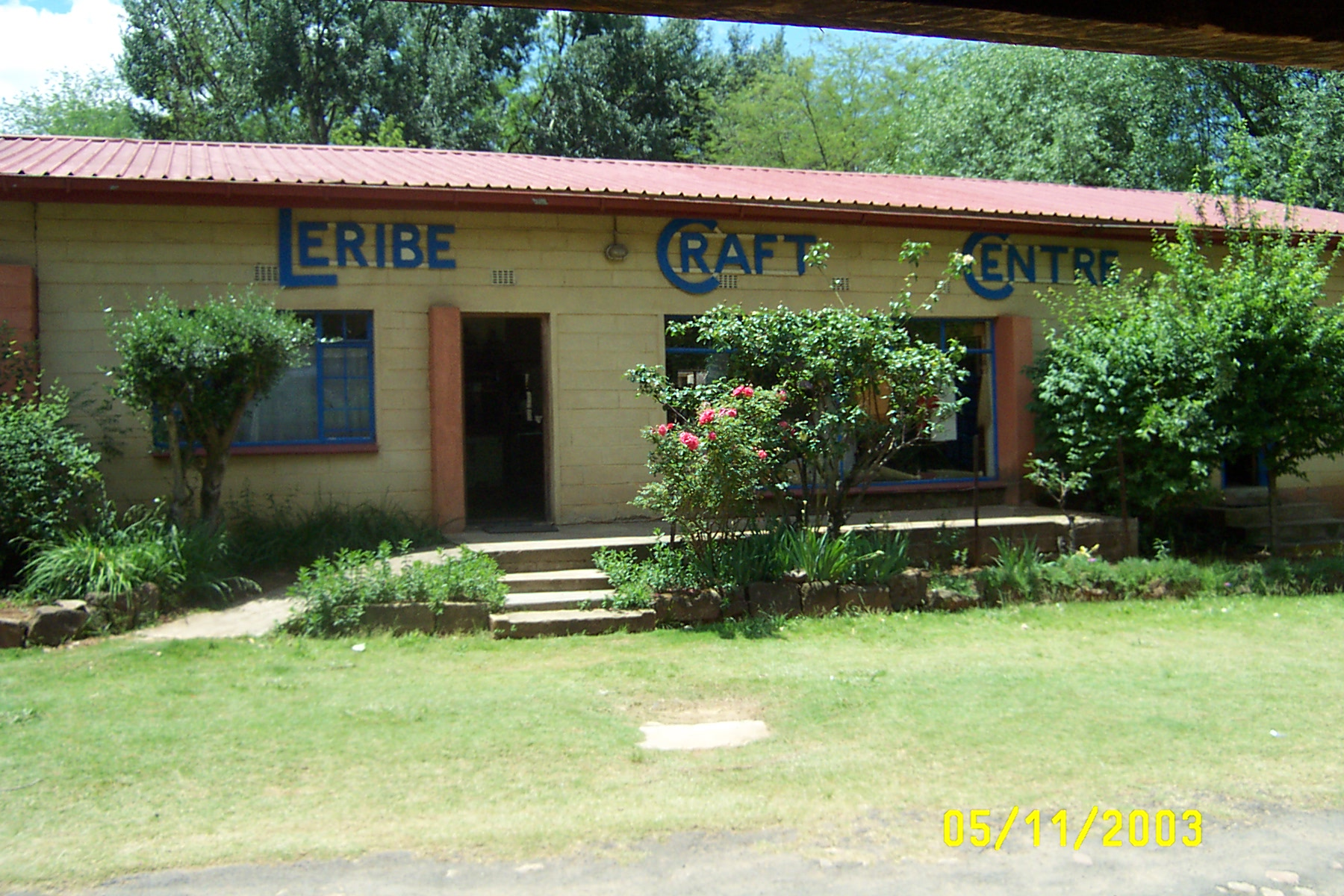
Leribe Craft Centre

Three sightseeing locations are the Leribe Craft Centre, the statue in front of the District Administration office, and an old military lookout.

The Leribe Craft Centre sells handmade wool items ranging from scarfs to jackets. It is located on the side of the road on the approach to Hlotse. The statue and military lookout date back to English rule of Lesotho and are located in the central part of the town.

== Climate ==
Climate data for Leribe (1981–2010)
Month	Jan	Feb	Mar	Apr	May	Jun	Jul	Aug	Sep	Oct	Nov	Dec	Year
Mean daily maximum °C (°F)	27.5 (81.5)	26.8 (80.2)	25.2 (77.4)	22.3 (72.1)	19.4 (66.9)	16.5 (61.7)	16.8 (62.2)	19.3 (66.7)	22.8 (73.0)	24.1 (75.4)	25.4 (77.7)	26.8 (80.2)	22.7 (72.9)
Mean daily minimum °C (°F)	14.0 (57.2)	13.5 (56.3)	11.2 (52.2)	7.3 (45.1)	2.5 (36.5)	−0.9 (30.4)	−1.5 (29.3)	1.6 (34.9)	5.9 (42.6)	9.3 (48.7)	11.2 (52.2)	12.9 (55.2)	7.3 (45.1)
Average rainfall mm (inches)	121.2 (4.77)	69.9 (2.75)	101.0 (3.98)	58.9 (2.32)	21.3 (0.84)	13.4 (0.53)	5.4 (0.21)	20.2 (0.80)	21.9 (0.86)	74.9 (2.95)	87.9 (3.46)	92.5 (3.64)	688.5 (27.11)
Average rainy days (≥ 0.5 mm)	12	10	11	7	3	2	1	3	3	9	9	10	80
Source: World Meteorological Organization

== Personalities linked to Hlotse ==
- Jeanne de Casalis (1891-1966), English actress with French and Swiss roots, was born in Hlotse from a missionary family.
