= Lesotho Premier League =

Mosotho association football league

- Founded: 1970; 56 years ago
- Country: Lesotho
- Confederation: CAF
- Number of clubs: 16
- Level on pyramid: 1
- Relegation to: Lesotho A Division
- Domestic cup(s): Lesotho Independence Cup (Top 4); MGC Supa 8
- International cup: CAF Champions League
- Current champions: Lijabatho FC (1st title) (2025–26)
- Most championships: Matlama FC (11)
- Sponsor(s): Vodacom Lesotho
- Current: 2026–27 Lesotho Premier League

The Lesotho Premier League, also known as the Vodacom Premier League for sponsorship reasons, is the top soccer division in Lesotho, and was created in 1970. Econet Telecom Lesotho was the league sponsor from 2017 to 2020. Vodacom Lesotho are again the league sponsor and were also the sponsor of the now cancelled Vodacom Soccer Spectacular knockout competition, which was the Lesotho's annual national cup tournament.

== Format ==
The Lesotho Premier League is currently contested by 16 clubs. The league uses a double round robin format meaning one team plays the other twice. Therefore, a team will play a total of 30 games per season. The team with the most points wins the league title.

The Lesotho Premier League is still played on an amateur status.

== Sponsorship ==
Since 2002, Lesotho's Premier League has been sponsored by telecommunications companies. Econet Telecom Lesotho, through its prepaid product Buddie, sponsored the Premier League and Lesotho's lower leagues (the A-Division, B-Division and C-Division) from 2002 until 2009. In 2009, the Lesotho Football Association (LeFA) ended its seven-year association with Econet Telecom Lesotho and signed a three-year partnership with Vodacom Lesotho. As part of the deal, Vodacom Lesotho agreed to sponsor the Premier League and all lower leagues for a combined M1 million per season for three years. However, in 2017, LeFA ended its sponsorship with Vodacom Lesotho to pen a new three-year multi-million maloti sponsorship with the previous sponsor Econet Telecom Lesotho in which the champions will pocket M500 000; a 150% increase from the previous M200 000 received by 2016–2017 champions Bantu.

The sponsor has been able to determine the league's sponsorship name. The list below details who the sponsors have been and what they have called the Lesotho Premier League:

- 2002–09: Econet Telecom Lesotho (Buddie Premier League)
- 2009–2017: Vodacom Lesotho (Vodacom Premier League)
- 2017–2020: Econet Telecom Lesotho (Econet Premier League)
- 2021–present: Vodacom Lesotho (Vodacom Premier League)

== Premier League domestic cups ==
- Lesotho Independence Cup (Top 4)
- MGC Supa 8 (Top 8)
- MGC Soccer Spectacular
- People's Cup

== Champions ==
Years	Champions
1970	Maseru United (1)
1971	Majantja FC (1)
1972	Police FC (1)
1973	Linare FC (1)
1974	Matlama FC (1)
1975	Maseru FC (1)
1976	Maseru United (2)
1977	Matlama FC (2)
1978	Matlama FC (3)
1979	Linare FC (2)
1980	Linare FC (3)
1981	Maseru Brothers (1)
1982	Matlama FC (4)
1983	Lesotho Defence Force FC (1)
1984	Lesotho Defence Force FC (2)
1985	Lioli FC (1)
1986	Matlama FC (5)
1987	Lesotho Defence Force FC (3)
1988	Matlama FC (6)
1989	Arsenal FC (1)
1990	Lesotho Defence Force FC (4)
1991	Arsenal FC (2)
1992	Matlama FC (7)
1993	Arsenal FC (3)
1994	Lesotho Defence Force FC (5)
1995	Majantja FC (2)
1996	Roma Rovers FC (1)
1997	Lesotho Defence Force FC (6)
1998	Lesotho Defence Force FC (7)
1999	Lesotho Defence Force FC (8)
2000	Lesotho Correctional Service (1)
2001	Lesotho Defence Force FC (9)
2002	Lesotho Correctional Service (2)
2003	Matlama FC (8)
2004	Lesotho Defence Force FC (10)
2005	Likhopo FC (1)
2006	Likhopo FC (2)
2007	Lesotho Correctional Services (3)
2008	Lesotho Correctional Services (4)
2009	Lioli FC (2)
2010	Matlama FC (9)
2011	Lesotho Correctional Services (5)
2012	Lesotho Correctional Services (6)
2013	Lioli FC (3)
2014	Bantu FC (1)
2015	Lioli FC (4)
2016	Lioli FC (5)
2017	Bantu FC (2)
2018	Bantu FC (3)
2019	Matlama FC (10)
2020	Bantu FC (4)
2020–21	Matlama FC (11)
2022–23	Bantu FC (5)
2023–24	Lioli FC (6)
2024–25	Lioli FC (7)
2025–26	Lijabatho FC (1)

== Performance by club ==
Club	City	Titles	Last title
Matlama	Maseru	11	2022
Lesotho Defence Force (includes Royal Lesotho Defence Force)	Maseru	8	2004
Lioli	Teyateyaneng	7	2024–25
Lesotho Correctional Services (includes Lesotho Prisons Service)	Maseru	6	2012
Bantu	Mafeteng	5	2023
Arsenal	Maseru	3	1993
Linare	Leribe	3	1980
Maseru Brothers (includes Maseru United)	Maseru	3	1981
Lesotho Paramilitary Forces	Maseru	2	1984
Likhopo FC	Maseru	2	2006
Majantja	Mohale's Hoek	2	1995
Lijabatho FC	Morija	1	2025–26
Maseru	Maseru	1	1975
Police	Maseru	1	1972
Roma Rovers	Roma	1	1996

== Top goalscorers ==
Year	Country	Best scorers	Team	Goals
2000–01	(Lesotho)	Lire Phiri	Lesotho Defence Force	30
2005–06	(Lesotho)	Masupha Majara	Lesotho Defence Force	9
2014–15	(Lesotho)	Litsepe Marabe	Bantu	22
2018–19	(Lesotho)	Sera Motebang	Matlama	18
2021–22	(Lesotho)	Katleho Makateng	Lesotho Defence Force	20
2022–23	(Lesotho)	Hlomelang Lebina	Lesotho Correctional Services	15
2022–23	(Lesotho)	Jane Thabantso	Matlama	15
2023–24	(Lesotho)	Lemohang Lintsa	Limkwokwing University FC	19
2024–25	(Lesotho)	Makara Ntaitsane	Lesotho Correctional Services FC	20
2025-26	(Lesotho)	Thumalo Khutlang	Lijabatho	18
