= Lesotho Defence Force FC =

Association football club in Lesotho

Defence Force
- Full name: Lesotho Defence Force FC
- Ground: Ratjomose Stadium, Maseru, Lesotho
- Capacity: 1,000
- League: Lesotho Premier League
- 2025–26: 6th

Lesotho Defence Force FC is a Lesotho football club based in Maseru. It is based in the city of Maseru in the Maseru District.

The team currently plays in Lesotho Premier League.

== Stadium ==
Currently the team plays at the 1,000 capacity Ratjomose Stadium.
