= Lesotho Mounted Police Service FC =

Association football club in Lesotho

Police Service
- Full name: Lesotho Mounted Police Service FC
- Nickname: Simunye
- Ground: PTC Ground Europa, Maseru, Lesotho
- Capacity: 1,000
- Owner: LMPS
- Manager: Tiisetso Molete
- League: Lesotho Premier League
- 2025–26: 10th
Home colours

Lesotho Mounted Police Service FC is a Lesotho football club based in Maseru. It is based in the city of Maseru in the Maseru District.

The team currently plays in Lesotho Premier League.

== Stadium ==
Currently the team plays at the 1,000 capacity PTC Ground Europa.
