= Lesotho Correctional Services FC =

Association football club in Lesotho

LCS
- Full name: Lesotho Correctional Services
- Ground: Maseru, Lesotho
- League: Lesotho Premier League
- 2025–26: 9th
Home colours	Away colours	Third colours

Lesotho Correctional Services football club are a team based in Maseru, Lesotho. They compete in the Lesotho Premier League and have won four league titles.

== Achievements ==
- Lesotho Premier League
  - Champions (6): 2000, 2002 (both as Lesotho Prisons Service); 2007, 2008, 2011, 2012

== Performance in CAF competitions ==
- CAF Champions League: 1 appearance

2008 – Preliminary Round
2012 – Preliminary Round

- CAF Confederation Cup: 0 appearance
- CAF Super Cup: 0 appearance

== Players ==
=== First team players ===
Note: Flags indicate national team as defined under FIFA eligibility rules; some limited exceptions apply. Players may hold more than one non-FIFA nationality.

No.	Pos.	Nation	Player
—	GK	LES	Kopano Silase
—	GK	LES	Mosoeu Siahlolo
