= FC Likhopo =

Association football club in Lesotho

- Full name: Football Club Likhopo
- Nickname: Redarmy
- Founded: 1995
- Ground: LCS-Field
- Capacity: 3,000
- Chairman: Mrs Queen Molatoli
- Manager: Koena Melao
- League: Lesotho Premier League
- 2021–22: 15th
Home colours	Away colours

Likhopo Football Club is a Lesotho football club located in Maseru, Lesotho. It currently plays in Lesotho Premier League.

== Titles ==
- Lesotho Premier League: 2

2005, 2006

== Performance in CAF competitions ==
- CAF Champions League: 2 appearances

2006 – Preliminary Round
2007 – Preliminary Round
