= Bantu FC =

Association football club in Lesotho

- Full name: Bantu Football Club
- Nickname: A Mats'o Matebele
- Founded: 1927
- Ground: Leshoboro Seeiso Sports Complex Mafeteng, Lesotho
- Capacity: 7,000
- Chairman: Leuta John Leuta
- Coach: Motheo Mohapi
- League: Lesotho Premier League
- 2025–26: 3rd of 16
Home colours	Away colours	Third colours

Bantu Football Club is a Lesotho football club based in Mafeteng. The team currently plays in the Lesotho Premier League. It last won the Premier League in the 2022–23 season with 68 points.

== History ==
Bantu F.C. was formed in 1927 as Flying Sweeps of Mafeteng and later renamed Bantu F.C. The founders were the then district Commissioner Button in Consultation with the four Principal Chiefs of Mafeteng.

The team was given the name Bantu after it was alleged that the first tribes to arrive in the district were Matebele hence the chiefs had to rule different tribes and clans which were all the Bantu speaking people. Thus, the rationale behind the name was meant to unite all the tribes in Mafeteng.

The team has always been regarded as a district number one priority in Mafeteng district. The traditional colours of Bantu are black and gold which are the celebrated colours of Mafeteng district. The team is nicknamed A Mats’o Matebele and its supporters Makaota. Home stadium is Leshoboro Seeiso Sports Complex in Mafeteng, alternative stadiums are Setsoto and Maputsoe DiFA in Maseru and Leribe respectively.

== Performance in CAF competitions ==
Bantu represented Lesotho for the first time in CAF Competitions by appearing at the CAF Cup Winners Cup (Confederations Cup) in 1993. Bantu was drawn against Black Africa of Namibia and for the first leg of the preliminary round; it had to travel for a long distance by bus from Mafeteng to Windhoek, Namibia only to find that their opponents won’t play because of Political instability in the country. Then, Bantu progressed to the second round where they played against Witbank Black Aces of South Africa.

- CAF Champions League: 4 appearances

2015– preliminary round
2017 – preliminary round
2018 – first round
2020 – preliminary round

- CAF Cup Winners' Cup: 2 appearances

1994 – first round
1998 – preliminary round

- CAF Confederation Cup: 1 appearance

2018 – play-off round

== Honours ==
=== League ===
- Lesotho Premier League
  - Winners (5): 2013–14, 2016–17, 2017–18, 2019–20, 2022–23

=== Cup competitions ===
- Independence Cup
  - Winners (8): 1963, 1993, 1997, 2011, 2012, 2013, 2015, 2017
- Top 8 Cup
  - Winners (1): 2016
- People's Cup
  - Winners (1): 2025

== Former coaches ==
- Lesotho Bob Atang Mafoso
- South Africa Moeketsi Abram Mongoya
- South Africa Thabo Tsutsulupa
- Lesotho Bob Atang Mafoso
- South Africa James Madidilane
- Lesotho Katiso Mojakhomo
- Lesotho Motlatsi Shale
- Lesotho Caswell Moru
- Lesotho Ntebele 'Tata Mcholene' Taole
- Lesotho Mokhele Mokhele
- Lesotho Lehlohonolo Thotanyane
- (Lesotho) Charles Manda (2025–2026)
- (Lesotho) Motheo Mohapi (2026–)

== Sponsorship ==
In September 2025, the club signed a three-year M2.16 million sponsorship deal with Naledi Funeral Planners.
