= Lioli FC =

Association football club in Lesotho

- Full name: Lioli Football Club
- Nickname: Tse Nala
- Founded: 1932; 94 years ago
- Stadium: Lioli Football Stadium
- Capacity: 3,000 (Standing)
- President: Lebohang Thotanyane (2020 - present)
- Head Coach: Bongani Maseko
- League: Lesotho Premier League
- 2025-26: 7th
- Website: www.facebook.com/liolifc/

Lioli Football Club is a football club that plays in the Lesotho Premier League. The team is based in Teyateyaneng. The club has won seven league championships, most recently in 2024–25.

== History ==
The club was founded in 1932.

Having won the 2024–25 Lesotho Premier League, Lioli will be participating in the CAF Champions League. With Lesotho not having any stadiums meeting Confederation of African Football standards, Lioli will be playing their home games at the Free State Stadium in Bloemfontein in neighbouring South Africa.

=== Crest ===
Old logo

=== Facilities ===
In May 2026, Liolo became the first club in Lesotho to own a fully-equipped gym.

== Gallery ==
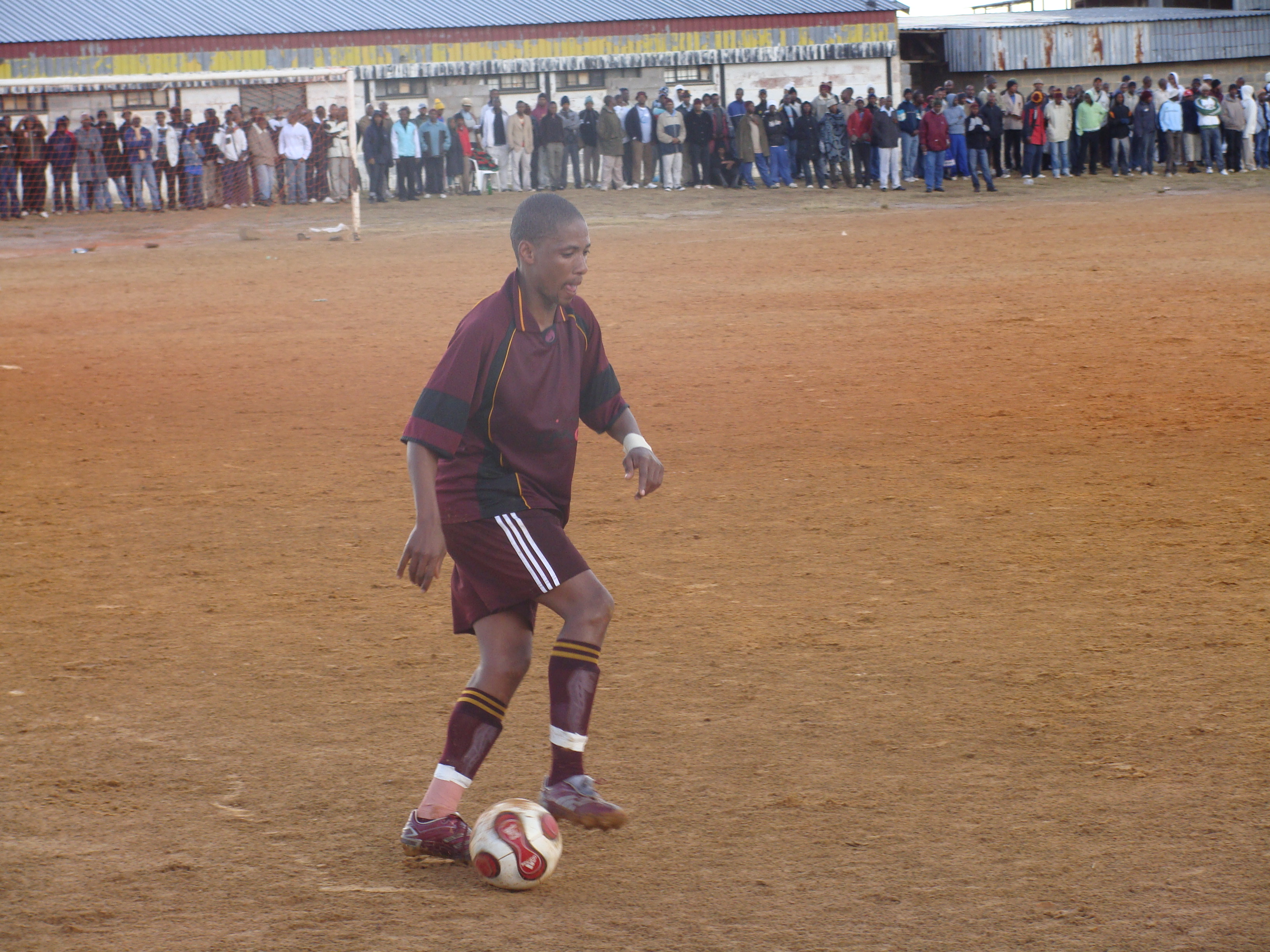

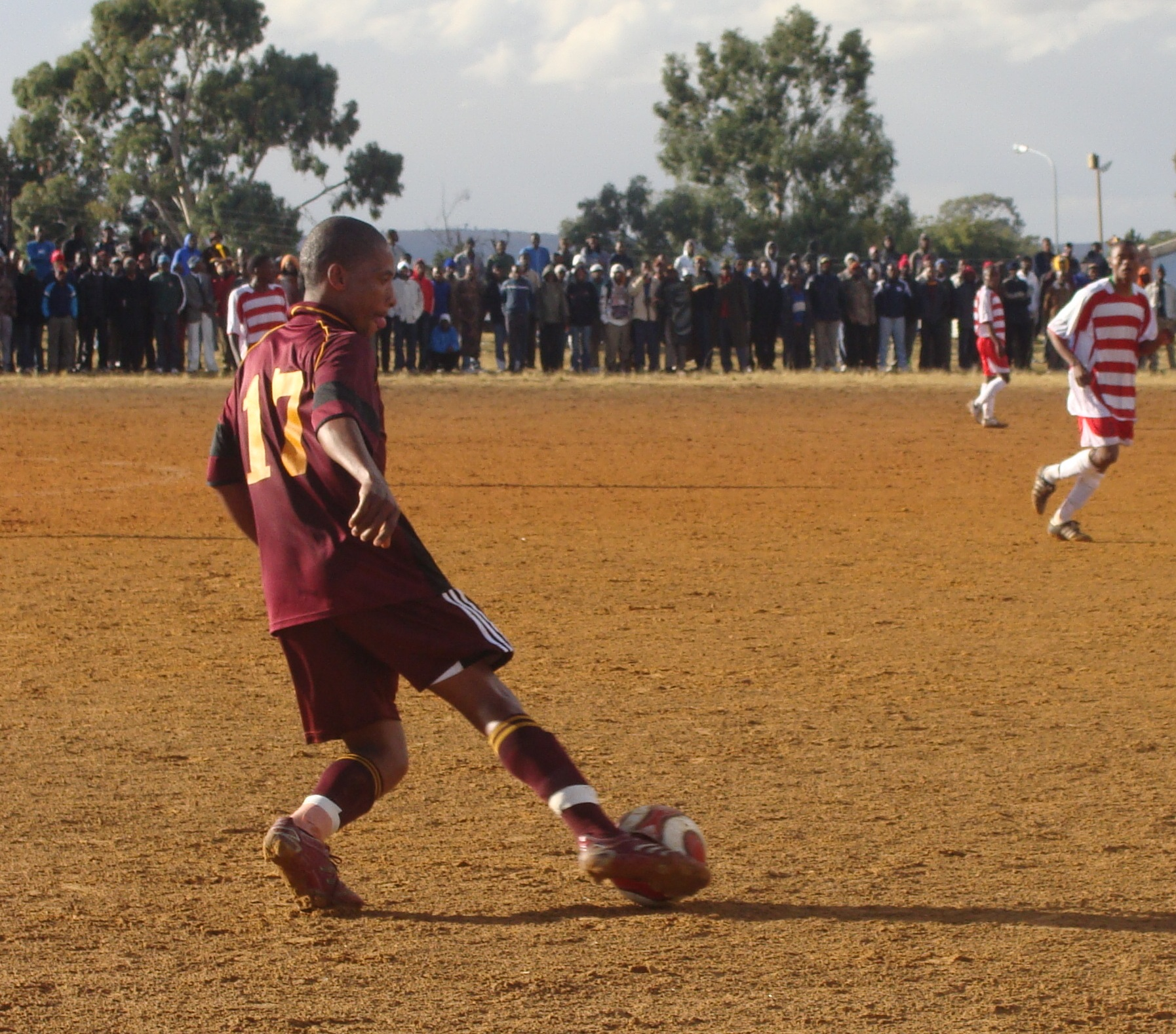

== Achievements ==
- Lesotho Premier League: 7

1985, 2009, 2013, 2015, 2016, 2024, 2024–25

- Lesotho Cup: 5

1984, 2007, 2010, 2014, 2016

- Lesotho Premier League's Top Goalscorer:

2012–13: Ts'epo Seturumane with 16 goals.
