= List of companies of Lesotho =

Location of Lesotho

Lesotho is an enclaved, landlocked country in southern Africa surrounded by South Africa. Previously known as Basutoland, Lesotho declared independence from the United Kingdom on 4 October 1966. It is a member of the United Nations, the Commonwealth of Nations and the Southern African Development Community (SADC). The name Lesotho translates roughly into the land of the people who speak Sesotho. About 40% of the population lives below the international poverty line of US$1.25 a day.

== Notable firms ==
This list includes notable companies with primary headquarters located in the country. The industry and sector follow the Industry Classification Benchmark taxonomy. Organizations which have ceased operations are included and noted as defunct.

Notable companies Status: P=Private, S=State; A=Active, D=Defunct
Name	Industry	Sector	Headquarters	Founded	Notes	Status	
Basutoland Ink	Consumer goods	Clothing & accessories	Maseru	2006	Clothing, sportswear	P	A
Central Bank of Lesotho	Financials	Banks	Maseru	1978	Central bank	S	A
Lesotho Airways	Consumer services	Airlines	Maseru	1979	Airline, defunct 1997	P	D
Maluti Sky	Consumer services	Airlines	Maseru	2009	Airline, defunct 2017	P	D
Telecom Lesotho	Telecommunications	Fixed line telecommunications	Maseru	2008	Telecom	P	A

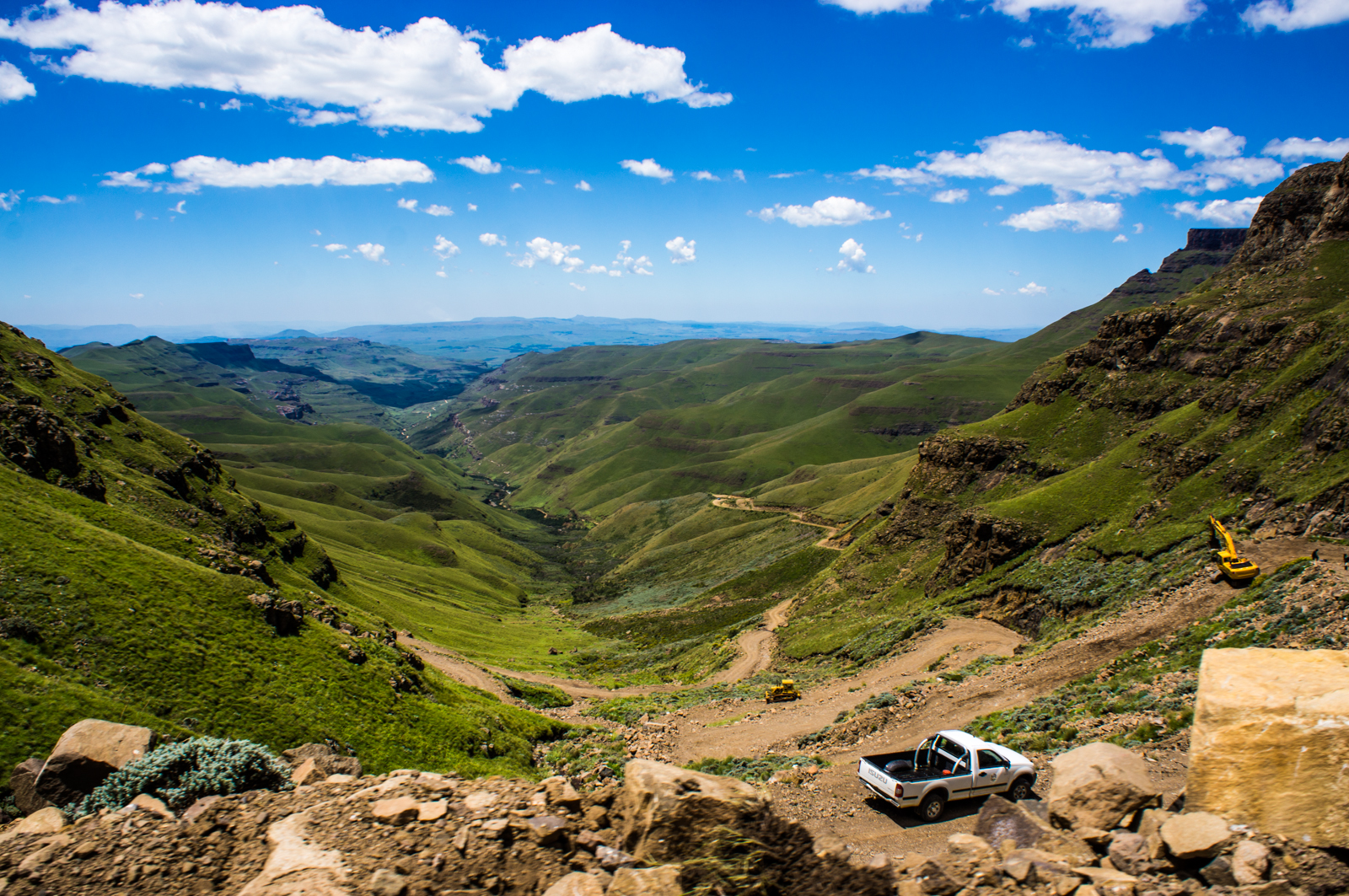
Sani Pass, a popular tourist attraction.

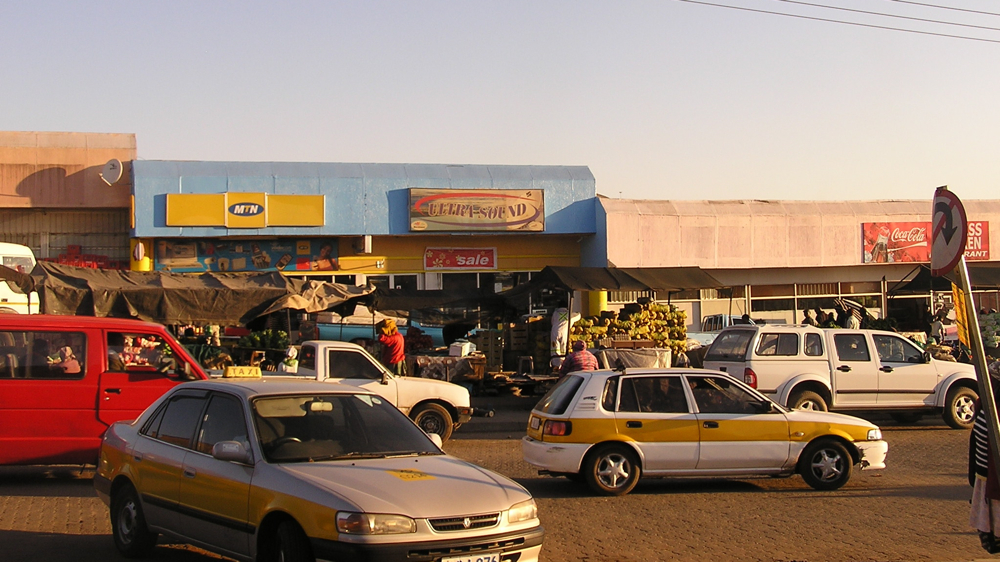
Open air market in downtown Maputsoe.

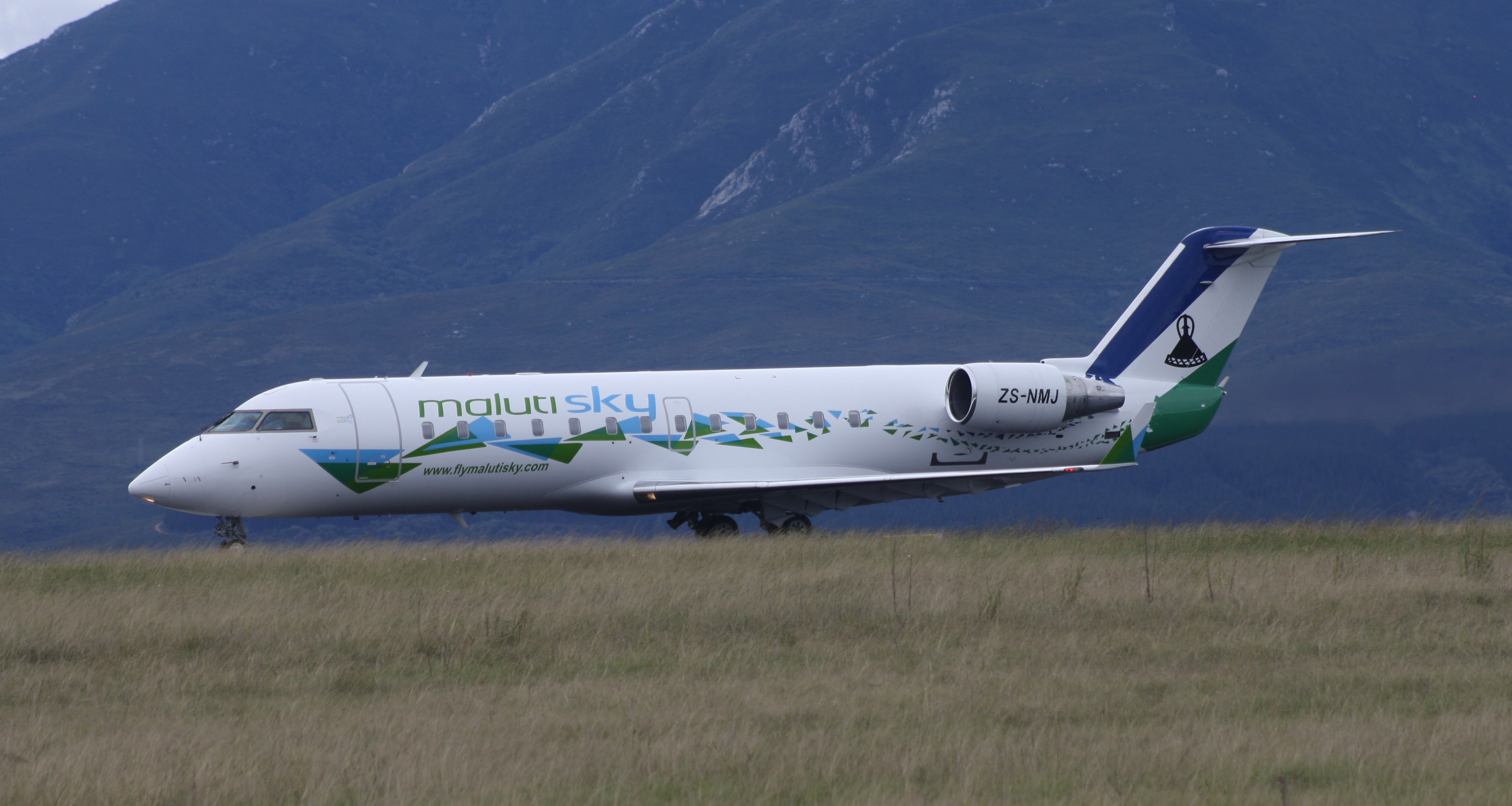
A Maluti Sky CRJ200 at George Airport

== See also ==
- Economy of Lesotho
- List of banks in Lesotho
