= Maluti Sky =

IATA	ICAO	Call sign
7D	MSU	MALUTI SKY
- Founded: 2009
- Ceased operations: 2017
- Hubs: Moshoeshoe I International Airport
- Destinations: 2
- Parent company: Matekane Group of Companies (MGC)
- Key people: Sam Matekane, founder

Maluti Sky was an airline based at Moshoeshoe I International Airport in Maseru, the capital of Lesotho. It offered scheduled and charter flights. The airline was founded in 2009 as MGC Airlines, becoming the first privately owned airline in Lesotho. Maluti Sky began passenger flights to Johannesburg in March 2016; it was at that time the only airline based in the country since Lesotho Airways ceased operations in 1996. However, the airline terminated all flights in 2017 as a result of financial issues.

== History ==
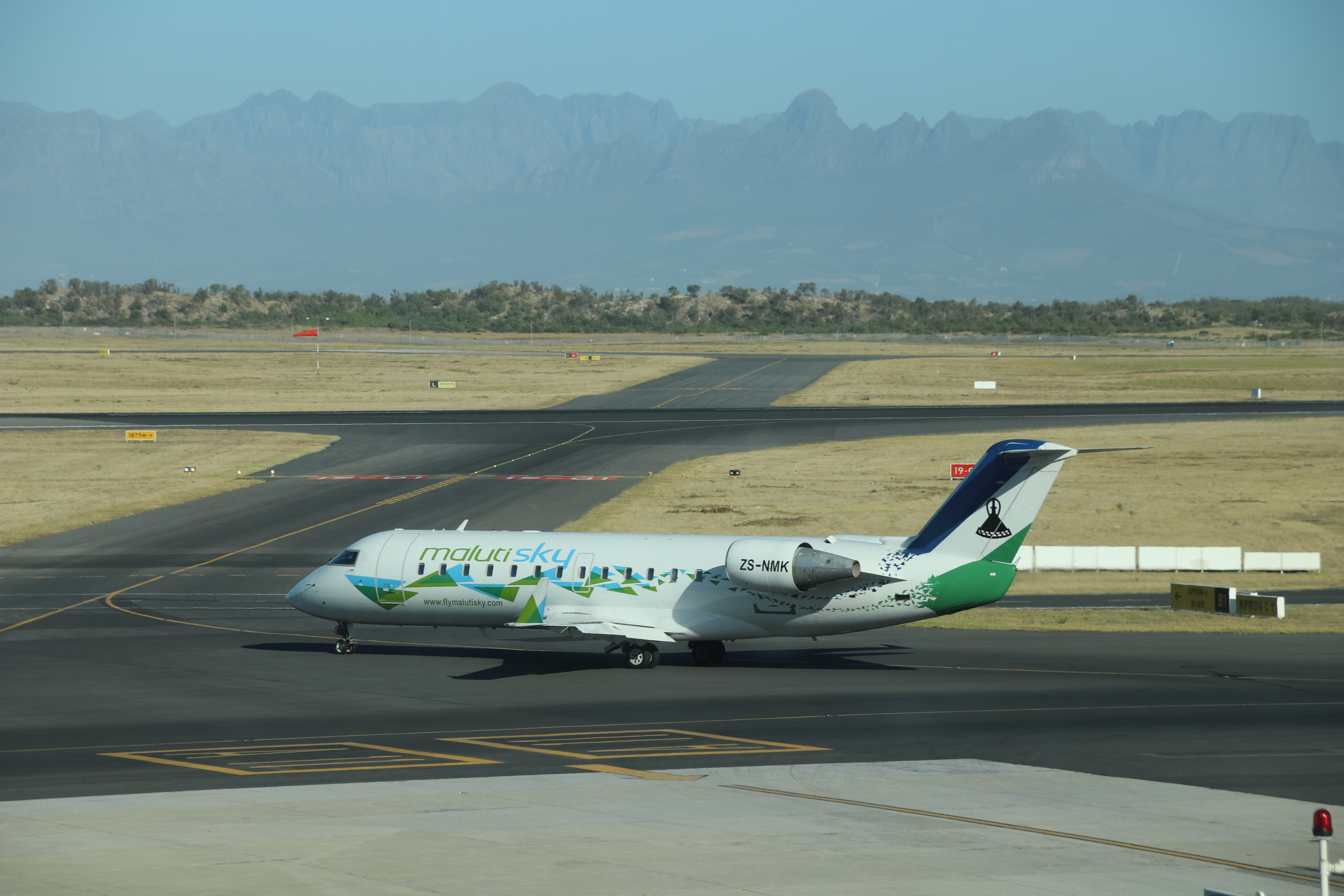
Maluti Sky CRJ-200ER at Cape Town International Airport in 2017.

Maluti Sky was founded in 2009 as MGC Airlines. The founder, entrepreneur Sam Matekane, says he was inspired to start the airline after King Letsie III was stranded in Paris because of a strike by Air France pilots in November 2008. MGC Aviation was officially launched on 23 February 2010 with King Letsie III and Prime Minister Pakalitha Mosisili in attendance. The airline began charter operations using a Hawker 700A and a Eurocopter EC135.

In April 2012, the airline received its first Bombardier CRJ200, followed by a second in 2013. The aircraft were initially used on charter flights and by other African airlines. In June 2015, MGC Airlines rebranded as Maluti Sky.

On 29 March 2016, the airline launched scheduled operations with flights to Johannesburg from Maseru using the Bombardier CRJ200. However, parent firm Matekane Group of Companies (MGC) announced in April 2017 that Maluti Sky would soon end operations; the airline had difficulty competing with Airlink, which also operates the Johannesburg–Maseru route. Maluti Sky had indeed ceased flights by July 2017.

== See also ==
- List of defunct airlines of Lesotho
