= Lesotho Airways =

National airline of Lesotho (1970-1997)

IATA	ICAO	Call sign
QL	LAI	LESOTOAIR
- Founded: 1970
- Ceased operations: 1997 (as Lesotho Airways) 1999 (as Air Lesotho)
- Hubs: Moshoeshoe International Airport
- Fleet size: 4
- Destinations: 16
- Headquarters: Maseru, Lesotho
- Key people: Eddie Absil, Chairman

Lesotho Airways, formerly Air Lesotho, was the national airline of Lesotho based on the grounds of Mejametalana Airport in Maseru. Until 1997, it was wholly owned by the Basotho government and operated both international and domestic passenger services to 16 destinations across 4 countries. Its main base was the Moshoeshoe International Airport. On October 1, 1996, Lesotho Airways had to suspend its international flights due to the inability to satisfy the minimum requirements specified by the Department of Civil Aviation. In 1997, Rossair Contracts Private Ltd acquired the assets of Lesotho Airways as it was financially insolvent.

== Historical fleet ==
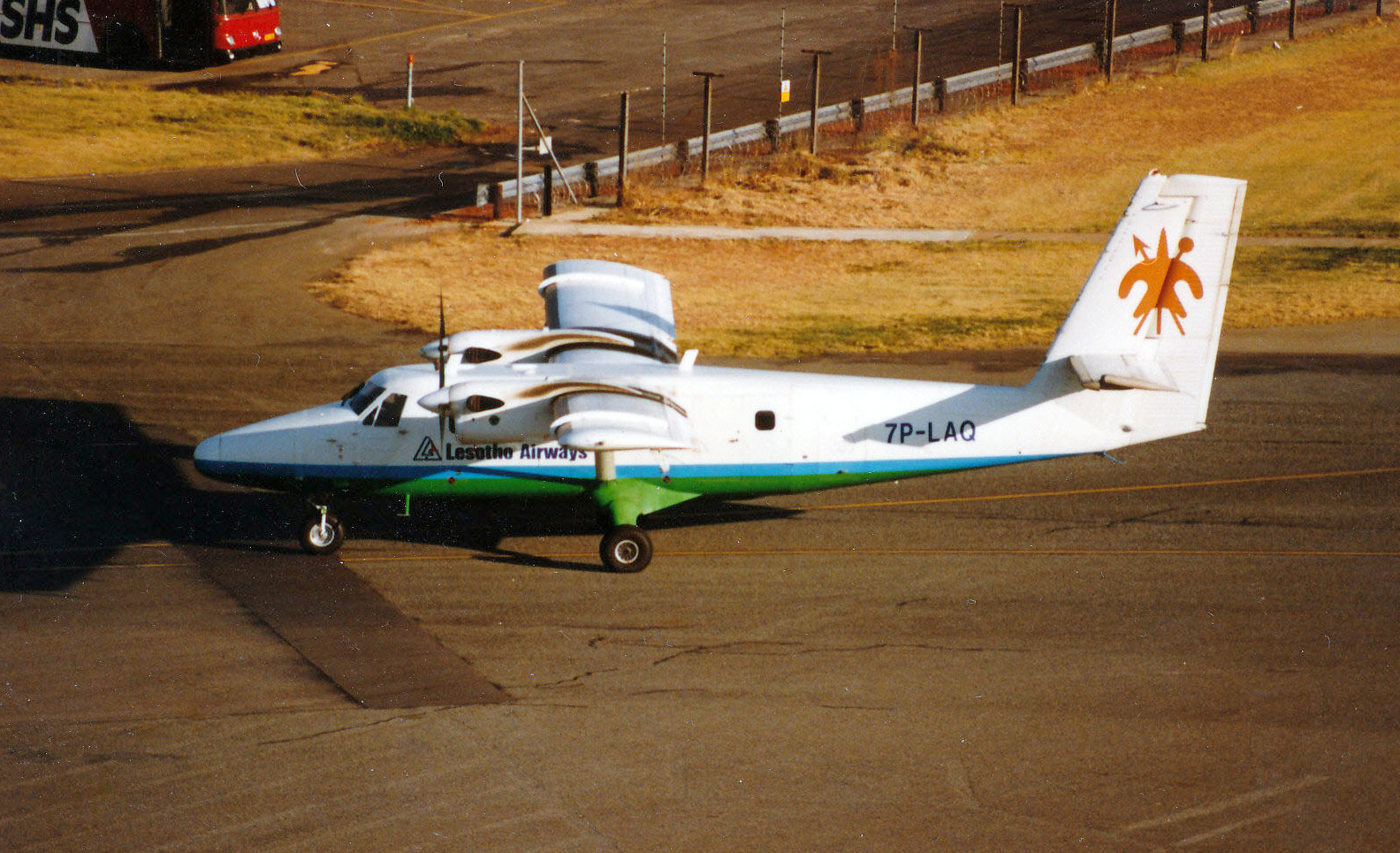
Lesotho Airways DHC-6 Twin Otter

- 4 - de Havilland Canada DHC-6 Twin Otter
- 2 - Beechcraft 1900
- 1 - Fairchild Hiller FH-227
- 1 - Boeing 707-326C

== See also ==
- List of defunct airlines of Lesotho
