= LPB =

LPB may stand for:

== Companies ==
- Latino Public Broadcasting, a non-profit organization that is funded by the Corporation for Public Broadcasting in the United States
- Lesotho PostBank, a bank in Lesotho
- Louisiana Public Broadcasting, a state-run, viewer-supported network of PBS member stations serving the U.S. state of Louisiana
- LPB (bank), a Lithuanian bank, previously known as "Latvijas Pasta Banka"

== Places ==
- El Alto International Airport in La Paz, Bolivia, which is assigned IATA airport code LPB
- Logistics Park Bozhurishte, a logistics and industrial park located near Sofia, the capital of Bulgaria
- Luang Prabang, a city in Laos

== Sports ==
- Colombian Professional Baseball League, known in Spanish as Liga Profesional de Béisbol Colombiano (LPB)
- Liga Portuguesa de Basquetebol, the Portuguese national basketball league
- Liga Profesional de Baloncesto, former name of the Venezuelan national basketball league (1993–2019)
- Liga Profesional de Baloncesto (Panama), the top professional basketball league in Panama

== Science and technology ==
- Linear Power Booster, signal amplifier by Electro-Harmonix
- Lipopolysaccharide binding protein, protein that binds to Lipopolysaccharide for presentation to receptors
- Liquid packaging board, a multi-ply paperboard
- Loss Prevention Bulletin, published by the UK Institution of Chemical Engineers
- Low plasticity burnishing, a method of surface enhancement/metal improvement

== Slang ==
- Low-Ping Bastard, a term used to refer to players in multiplayer online games with low latency, and thus low lag
