= Basotho Hat Shop =

Landmark and crafts shop in Maseru, Lesotho

- Mokorotlo building
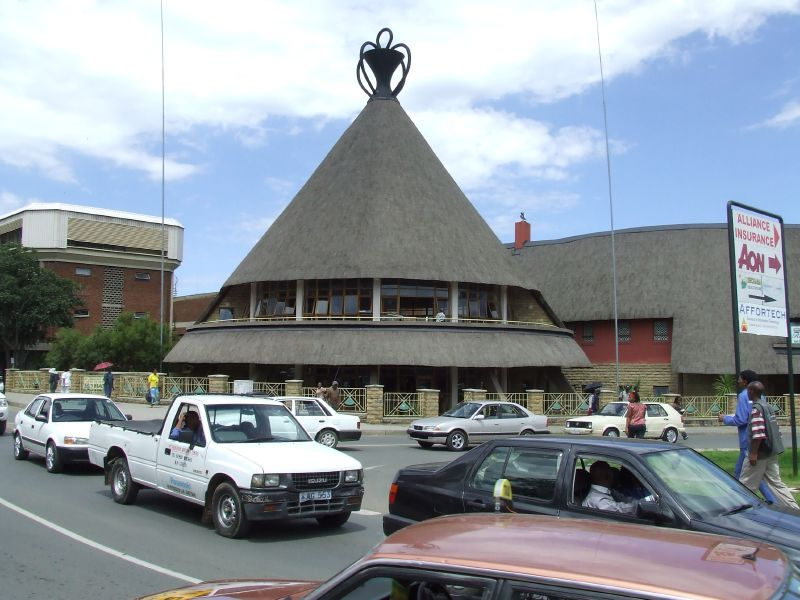
- Interactive map of the Basotho Hat Shop area

General information
- Type: Rondavel
- Architectural style: Novelty
- Location: Kingsway Road, Maseru, Lesotho
- Coordinates: 29°18′49″S 27°29′12″E
- Opened: April 28, 1962
- Renovated: 2000
- Demolished: 1998

Technical details
- Material: Thatch

Design and construction
- Architect: Colin Unsworth

The Basotho Hat Shop is a landmark, craft shop, and tourist attraction located in Maseru, Lesotho.

The building is conical in shape, and was originally constructed with reinforced concrete and a thatched roof. It was designed by Colin Unsworth, then the Assistant Government Architect, and opened on April 28, 1962.

The building is an example of novelty architecture as it is built to resemble a Mokorotlo, a traditional type of straw hat and national symbol of Lesotho. The Mokorotlo was in turn inspired by the conical shape of Mount Qiloane. The building operates as a craft shop, selling locally made, traditional handmade products, including Basotho hats, masks, pottery, and wood crafts and to tourists.

In 2000, the building belonged to Lesotho Cooperative Handicrafts and employed 11 Basotho crafters.

== Rebuilding ==
The building originally opened in 1962. In September 1998, during civil unrest in Maseru, the Basotho Hat building was destroyed by fire. In 2000, the government allocated L5,200,000 for a rebuilding project. In 2000 at the inauguration of the newly rebuilt Basotho Hat Shop, the then prime minister, Pakalitha Mosisili, called the building a "landmark and symbol of unity", and said that the building "indicates our identity as a nation."

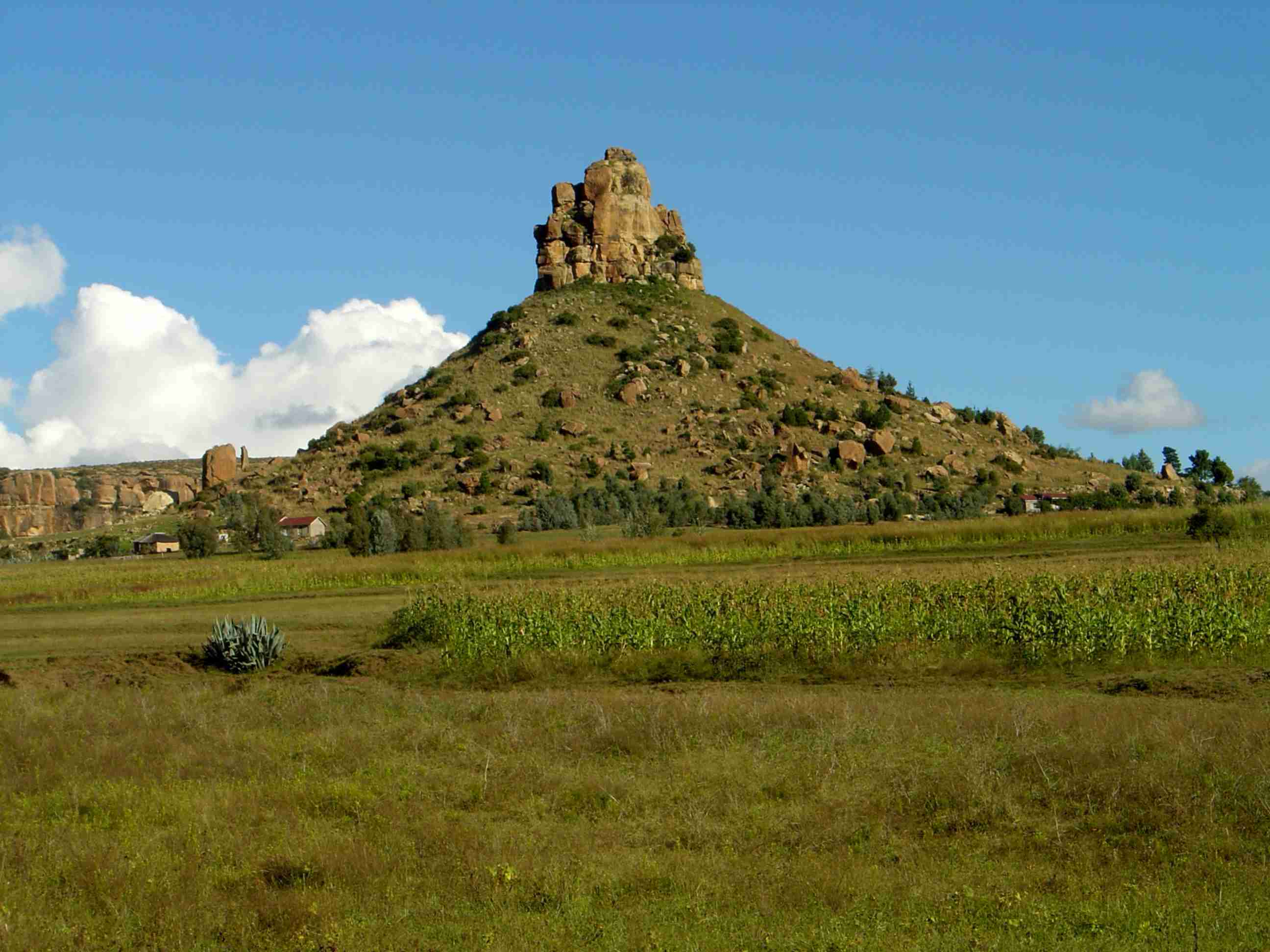
Mount Qiloane, the legendary conical mountain close to Thaba Bosiu, said to have inspired the mokorotlo.

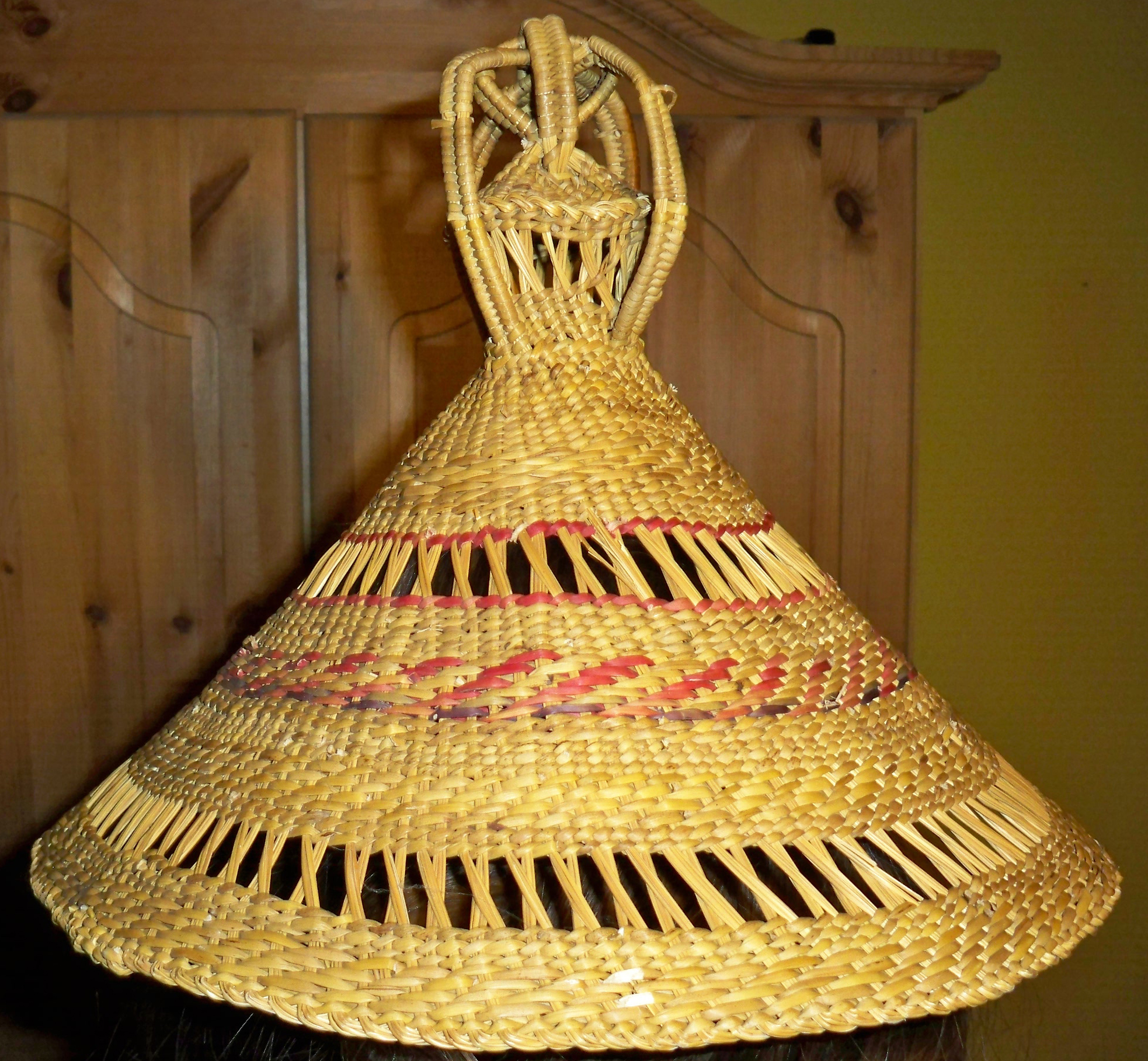
An example of a Mokorotl, a traditional straw hat

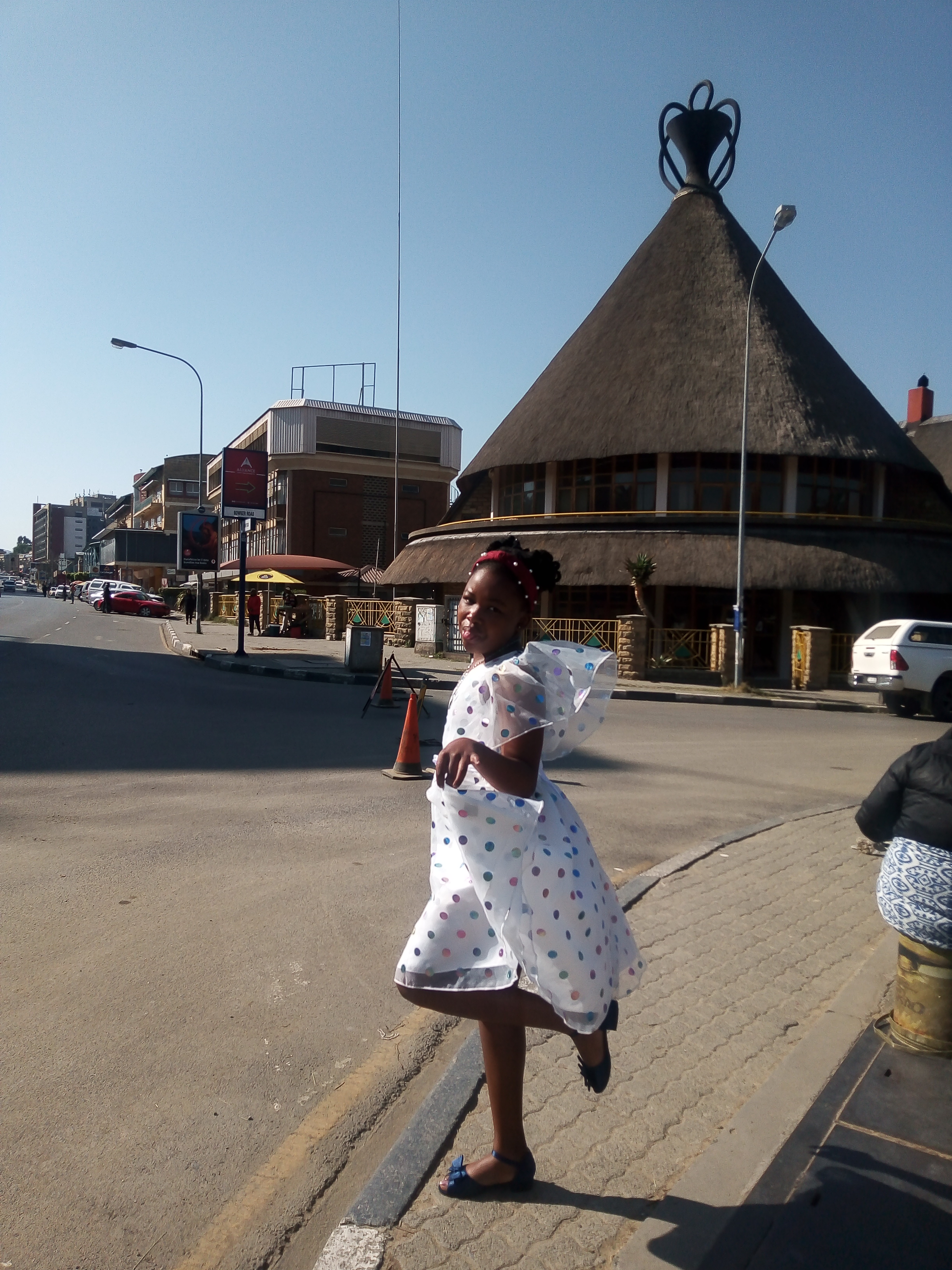
Basotho Hat Shop with a view of Kingsway

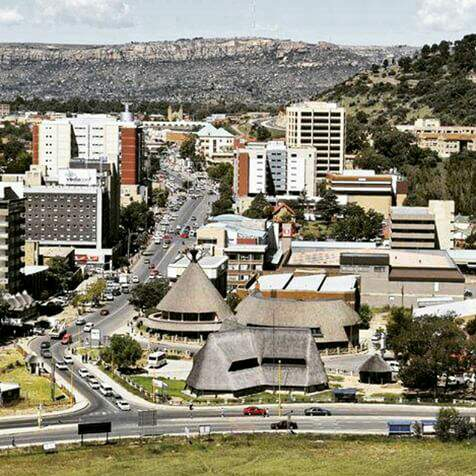
View of the Basotho Hat Shop within the city of Maseru
