= Economy of Lesotho =

National economy

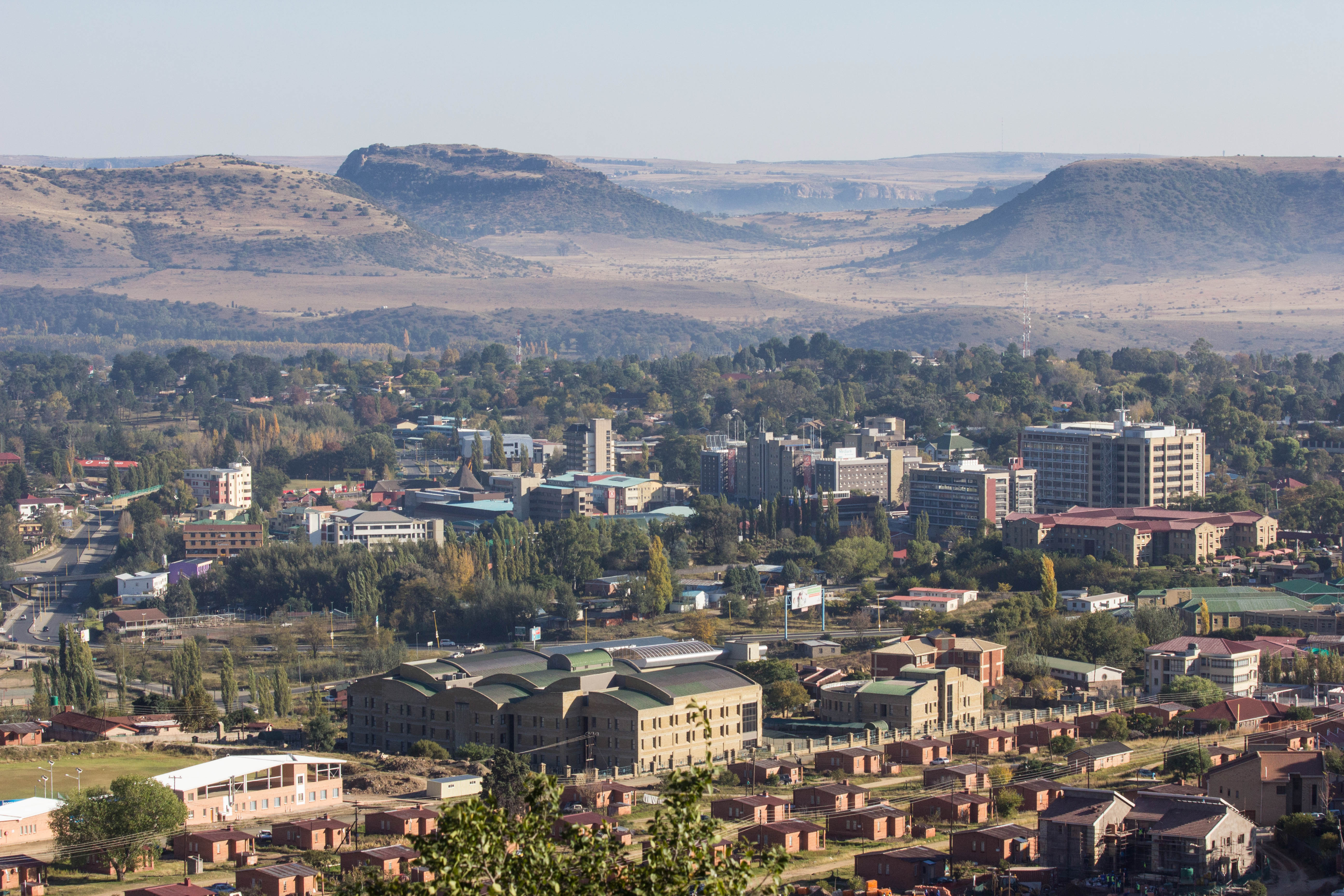
- Maseru, the economic hub of Lesotho
- Currency: Lesotho loti
- Fiscal year: 1 April – 31 March
- Trade organisations: WTO, SACU, SADC
- Country group: Least Developed; Lower middle-income economy

Statistics
- GDP: ▲$2.4 billion (nominal; 2025); ▲$7.41 billion (PPP; 2025)
- GDP rank: 172nd (nominal; 2025); 167th (PPP; 2025)
- GDP growth: ▲1.5% (2025); ▲1.4% (2026f)
- GDP per capita: ▲$1,100 (nominal; 2025); ▲$3,380 (PPP; 2025)
- GDP per capita rank: 169th (nominal; 2025); 167th (PPP; 2025)
- Inflation (CPI): 3.1% (2010 est.)
- Population below national poverty line: 40%
- Labour force: 855,000 (2007)
- Labour force by occupation: agriculture: about 80% of the resident population are engaged in subsistence agriculture; roughly 20% of the formal wage earners (about 200,000) work (mainly males) in South Africa, 20% of the workers (mainly females) are in the apparel industry in Lesotho, and 20% are employed by the Government of Lesotho. The others are employed in services and other manufacturing (2008).
- Unemployment: 24–28%
- Main industries: food, beverages, textiles and apparel, handicrafts, construction, tourism, mining

External
- Exports: $1,043 million f.o.b. (2010 est.)
- Export goods: Garments 53%, other including diamonds 47% (2008)
- Main export partners: US 60% Europe 17% SACU 19% (2007)
- Imports: $1,766 million c.i.f. (2010 est.)
- Import goods: food, building materials, vehicles, machinery, medicines, petroleum products, inputs to the apparel industry (2010)
- Main import partners: SACU 85% Taiwan; Hong Kong and China 14% (2007)

Public finance
- Government debt: $647 million (33% of GDP) (31 December 2010 est.)
- Revenue: $1,232 million (57% of GDP) (2009/10)
- Spending: $1,168 million (2009/10)
- All values, unless otherwise stated, are in US dollars.

Lesotho has a developing economy. It is based on tourism, manufacturing, mining, and agriculture, and depends heavily on remittances from its diaspora. The nation, a lower middle income country, is geographically surrounded by South Africa and is economically integrated with it as well. A significant portion of the population subsists on farming with a gradual ongoing transition into tourism and manufacturing.

Lesotho is a member of the Southern African Customs Union (SACU) in which tariffs have been eliminated on the trade of goods between the other member countries, Botswana, Namibia, South Africa, and Eswatini. Lesotho, Eswatini, Namibia, and South Africa also form a common currency and exchange control area known as the Rand Monetary Area that uses the South African rand as the common currency. In 1980, Lesotho introduced its own currency, the loti (plural: maloti). One hundred lisente equal one loti. The loti is at par with the rand.

== Economic history ==
Lesotho's early economic history was shaped by its integration into the regional economy of Southern Africa, a heavy reliance on labor migration and productivity in agriculture. In the 19th century, Lesotho was a significant agricultural exporter, supplying grain and mohair to South African mining camps. However, by the early 20th century, worsening land shortages and unfavorable climate conditions shifted Lesotho into a net food importer and a labor reserve for South African mines and farms. Labor migration became a central economic pillar, with tens of thousands of Basotho men seeking employment in South Africa throughout the 20th century. By 1982, over 100,000 Basotho were working in South African industries.

Lesotho's independence on the 4th of October 1966 marked the beginning of increased international aid flows, with Britain, Sweden, and multilateral donors providing financial assistance. And early aid efforts were largely directed at agriculture, based on the assumption that Lesotho was a purely agrarian society. Large-scale rural development projects, including those funded by the World Bank and USAID, repeatedly failed due to, among other reasons, poor planning and a lack of local participation.

Political instability influenced aid patterns. Following a 1970 coup, British and Swedish aid was temporarily suspended but resumed later that year. Lesotho also leveraged its opposition to apartheid to attract more aid, particularly after the 1976 Soweto Uprising and Transkei border conflicts. By 1979, development assistance had risen to $64 million.

Until the political insecurity in September 1998, Lesotho's economy had grown steadily since 1992. The riots, however, destroyed nearly 80% of commercial infrastructure in Maseru and two other major towns in the country, having a disastrous effect on the country's economy. Nonetheless, the country has completed several IMF Structural Adjustment Programs, and inflation declined substantially over the course of the 1990s. Lesotho's trade deficit, however, is quite large, with exports representing only a small fraction of imports.

The global economic crisis hit the Lesotho economy hard through loss of textile exports and jobs in the sector due largely to the economic slowdown in the United States which is a major export destination, reduced diamond mining and exports, including weak prices for diamonds; drop in SACU revenues due to the economic slowdown in the South African economy, and reduction in worker remittances due to weakening of the South African economy and contraction of the mining sector and related job losses in South Africa. In 2009, GDP growth slowed to 0.9 percent.

== Economic progress ==
Lesotho's progress in moving from a predominantly subsistence-oriented economy to a lower middle income, diversified economy exporting natural resources and manufacturing goods has brought higher, more secure incomes to a significant portion of the population. The percentage of the population living below USD PPP US$1.25/day fell from 48 percent to 44 percent between 1995 and 2003. The unemployment rate in 2008 was 25.29% and rose to 27.2% in 2012. However, the unemployment rate fell to 23.06% in 2017. The percentage of the population living below the poverty line fell from 58% in 2002 to 49.2% in 2017. The country is still among the "Low Human Development" countries (rank 155 of 192) as classified by the UNDP, with 42.3 years of life expectancy at birth. However, adult literacy is very high, at 82%, and children underweight aged under 5 are only 20%.

Lesotho has received economic aid from a variety of sources, including the United States, the World Bank, the United Kingdom, the European Union, and Germany.

Lesotho has nearly 6,000 kilometers of unpaved and modern all-weather roads. There is a short rail line (freight) linking Lesotho with South Africa that is totally owned and operated by South Africa.

== Sectors ==
=== Apparel ===
Lesotho has taken advantage of the African Growth and Opportunity Act (AGOA) to become the largest exporter of garments to the US from sub-Saharan Africa. American Brands and retailers sourcing from Lesotho include: Foot Locker, Gap, Gloria Vanderbilt, JCPenney, Levi Strauss, Saks, Sears, Timberland and Wal-Mart. In mid-2004 its employment reached over 50,000 mainly female workers, marking the first time that manufacturing sector workers outnumbered government employees. In 2008 it exported 487 million dollars mainly to the United States. Since 2004 employment in the sector was somehow reduced to about 45,000, in mid-2011, due to intense international competition in the garment sector. It was the largest formal sector employer in Lesotho in 2011. The sector initiated a major program to fight HIV/AIDS, called Apparel Lesotho Alliance to Fight AIDS (ALAFA). It is an industry-wide program providing prevention and treatment for the workers.

=== Husbandry ===
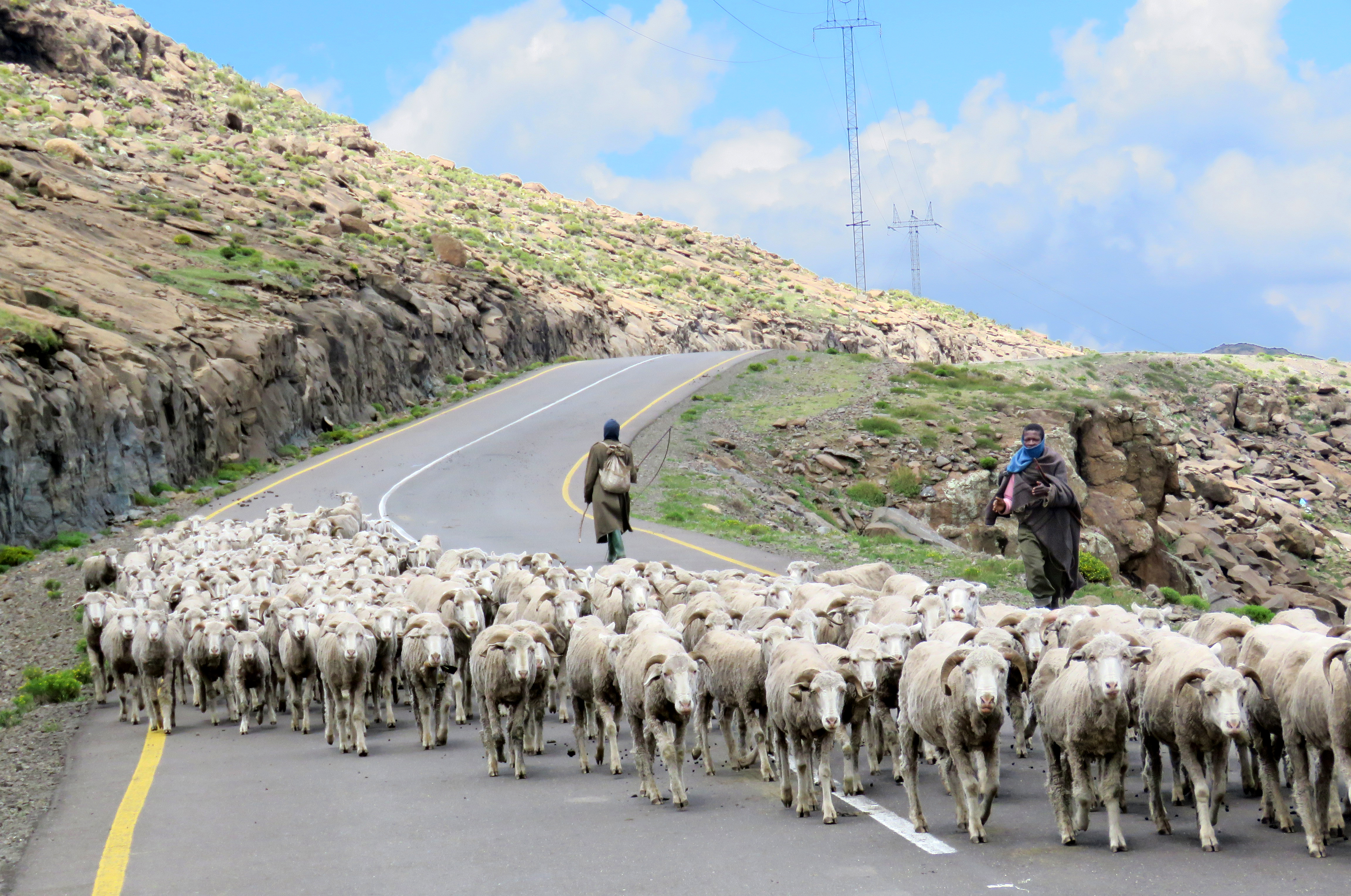
High-mountain shepherds

The western lowlands form the main agricultural zone. Almost 50% of the population earn income through informal crop cultivation or animal husbandry with nearly two-thirds of the country's income coming from the agricultural sector. About 70% of the population lives in rural areas and works in agriculture.

== Women in the economy ==
While women are more subject to access to secondary schooling than men, men make 1.5 times more income than women. Prior to the 1950s, Basotho women migrated to South Africa for work due to an agricultural decline. Of those who migrated, many of them were unwed and many stayed in South Africa. Married couples also traveled to South Africa together for work. In 1923, the pass law Natives (Urban Areas) Act was passed in South Africa which required black men to carry passports with them at all times when in white areas for work. Women were included in an amendment to the law in 1952. The amendment caused a decline in migration of female labor, and by the 1970s, only 36.1% of women over age 39 in Lesotho had worked in South Africa. Lesotho women did not work in mines.

In the 1980s, Lesotho received aid to help with the manufacturing industry. The main workers employed in the industry were young women. In 1990, 92% of employees in the textile industry were women.

About 86% of the female population in Lesotho works in the textile industry.

== Natural resources ==
Water and diamonds are Lesotho's only significant natural resources. Water is being extracted through the 30-year, multibillion-dollar Lesotho Highlands Water Project (LHWP), which was initiated in 1986. The LHWP is designed to capture, store, and transfer water from the Orange River system and send it to South Africa's Free State and greater Johannesburg area, which features a large concentration of South African industry, population and agriculture. At the completion of the project, Lesotho should be almost completely self-sufficient in the production of electricity and also gain income from the sale of electricity to South Africa. The World Bank, African Development Bank, European Investment Bank, and many other bilateral donors are financing the project. Diamonds are produced in Letšeng, Mothae, Liqhobong and Kao mines. The sector suffered a setback in 2008 as the result of the world recession but rebounded in 2010 and 2011. It is a major contributor to the exports of Lesotho.

== Other statistics ==
=== Main indicators ===
The following table shows the main economic indicators in 1980-2026. Inflation below 5% is in green.

Year	GDP			GDP growth (real)	Inflation	Government debt (% of GDP)
Year	Total (bil. US$ PPP)	Per capita (US$ PPP)	Total (bil. US$ nominal)	GDP growth (real)	Inflation	Government debt (% of GDP)
1980	0.6	423	0.4	▼ -0.8	▲19.6	n/a
1985	▲0.9	▲576	▼0.3	▲3.0	▲15.0	n/a
1990	▲1.4	▲781	▲0.6	▲6.4	▲12.0	▲18
1995	▲2.1	▲1062	▲1.0	▲4.1	▲9.7	▲62.8
2000	▲2.6	▲1299	▼0.9	▲4.0	▲6.1	▲88.5
2005	▲3.4	▲1739	▲1.7	▲3.3	▲3.6	▼41
2006	▲3.6	▲1875	1.7	▲4.2	▲6.3	▲43.7
2007	▲3.9	▲2015	▲1.8	▲5.0	▲9.2	▲49.6
2008	▲4.1	▲2094	▼1.7	▲2.7	▲10.7	▼47
2009	▲4.2	▲2102	▲1.9	▲0.5	▲5.8	▼35.9
2010	▲4.4	▲2219	▲2.4	▲5.1	▲3.3	▼33.8
2011	▲4.8	▲2386	▲2.6	▲6.3	▲6.0	▲36.2
2012	▲5.1	▲2520	▼2.5	▲4.7	▲5.5	▲39.8
2013	▲5.3	▲2566	▼2.3	▲1.2	▲5.0	▲41.2
2014	▲5.4	▲2619	▲2.5	▲1.5	▲4.6	▲41.5
2015	▲5.7	▲2708	▼2.2	▲3.6	▲4.3	▲45.8
2016	▲5.9	▲2763	2.2	▲2.3	▲6.2	▼41.5
2017	▼5.8	▼2685	▲2.4	▼ -3.3	▲4.5	▼41
2018	5.8	▼2646	▲2.5	▼ -1.3	▲4.7	▲48.2
2019	▼5.6	▼2554	▼2.3	▼ -1.8	▲4.9	▲58.2
2020	▲5.8	▲2592	▼2.1	▼ -8.6	▲5.4	▼54.7
2021	▲5.9	▼2590	▲2.4	▲4.6	▲6.5	▲58
2022	▲6.4	▲2790	▼2.3	▲1.6	▲8.2	▲64.4
2023	▲6.8	▲2933	▼2.2	▲2.5	▲6.5	▼61.1
2024	▲7.3	▲3118	▲2.5	▲4.9	▲5.2	▼52.8
2025	▲7.6	▲3212	▲2.9	▲1.4	▲4.4	▼49.1
2026	▲7.9	▲3301	▲3.0	▲1.1	▲4.2	▼49

== See also ==
- Economy of Africa
- Lesotho
- List of Basotho companies
- Child labour in Lesotho
- United Nations Economic Commission for Africa
