= List of banks in Lesotho =

This is a list of commercial banks in Lesotho, as updated in July 2024 by the Central Bank of Lesotho.

== List of commercial banks ==
- Standard Lesotho Bank Ltd, part of Standard Bank Group
- Nedbank Lesotho Ltd, part of Nedbank Group
- First National Bank Lesotho Ltd, part of FirstRand Group
- Lesotho Post Bank Ltd

== See also ==
- Economy of Lesotho
- List of banks in Africa
