= Erik Lennart Karlsson =

Governor of the Bank of Namibia
- In office 1 September 1991 – 31 December 1993
- Preceded by: Wouter Benard
- Succeeded by: Jaafar bin Ahmad

Governor of the Central Bank of Lesotho
- In office November 1985 – June 1988
- Preceded by: Stefan Schönberg
- Succeeded by: Anthony Mothae Maruping

Personal details
- Born: 25 November 1918 Stenbrohult
- Died: 2001 (aged 82–83)

Erik Lennart Karlsson (1918 – 2001) was a Swedish banker and economist.

Erik Karlsson studied as an adult at Brunnsvik Folk High School after the Second World War, and got a bachelor's degree at Stockholm University. He began working at Sveriges Riksbank in 1960 and became deputy governor of the Riksbank in 1980. From November 1968, he was an executive director of the World Bank until 1971. After his retirement, he served in a SIDA aid project as Governor of the Central Bank of Lesotho from November 1985 to June 1988. Then he was the advisor of the governor of the Central Bank of Kenya from 1989 to 1990. Then he served as deputy governor of the Bank of Namibia, from July 1990 to August 1991, and then as governor of the Bank of Namibia from September 1991 to 31 December 1993.
