= List of defunct airlines of Lesotho =

This is a list of defunct airlines of Lesotho.

Airline	Image	IATA	ICAO	Callsign	Commenced operations	Ceased operations	Notes
Air Lesotho		QL	LAI	LESOTOAIR	1988	1999	Became Lesotho Airways
Antonair International			ANP	ANTONAIR	1996	2001	Operated Antonov An-8, Antonov An-12
Basutair					1961	1969	Operated Piper Tripacer, Dornier Do 27, Piper Super Cub, Taylorcraft LBT
Highland Air					1983	1984	Operated Cessna 206
Lesotho Airways		QL	LAI	LESOTOAIR	1970	1988	Renamed to Air Lesotho
Maluti Airservices					1954	1955	
Maluti Sky		7D	MSU	MALUTI SKY	2009	2017	
MGC Airline		7D	MSU		2009	2015	Renamed to Maluti Sky

== See also ==
- List of airlines of Lesotho
- List of airports in Lesotho
