= Apparel Lesotho Alliance to fight AIDS =

The Apparel Lesotho Alliance to Fight AIDS (ALAFA) is an industry-wide programme providing prevention and treatment for over 40 000 mainly women workers in the Lesotho apparel industry.

== Drivers for the creation of ALAFA ==
It is helping to combat two of the key drivers of the HIV/AIDS epidemic: poverty and gender inequality. Surveys within the sector show 43% of employees are HIV-positive. The creation of ALAFA was driven by humanitarian concerns and the need to make the industry sustainable in the long term.

== Launch and host ==
ALAFA was launched in May 2006 in Maseru. It is hosted by the Lesotho Textile Exporters’ Association and its advisory council brings together the combined interests of the ministries of health, trade, labour and industry, donors, the national AIDS commission, international clothing brands, employee and employer representatives, and service providers. This partnership now governs a large-scale, long-term intervention that ultimately affects the lives of hundreds of thousands of Basotho who depend on the industry directly and indirectly for their livelihood.
