= Central Bank of Lesotho =

State-owned bank in Lesotho

Coordinates: 29.3127°S 27.4892°E

Central Bank of Lesotho Banka e Kholo ea Lesotho

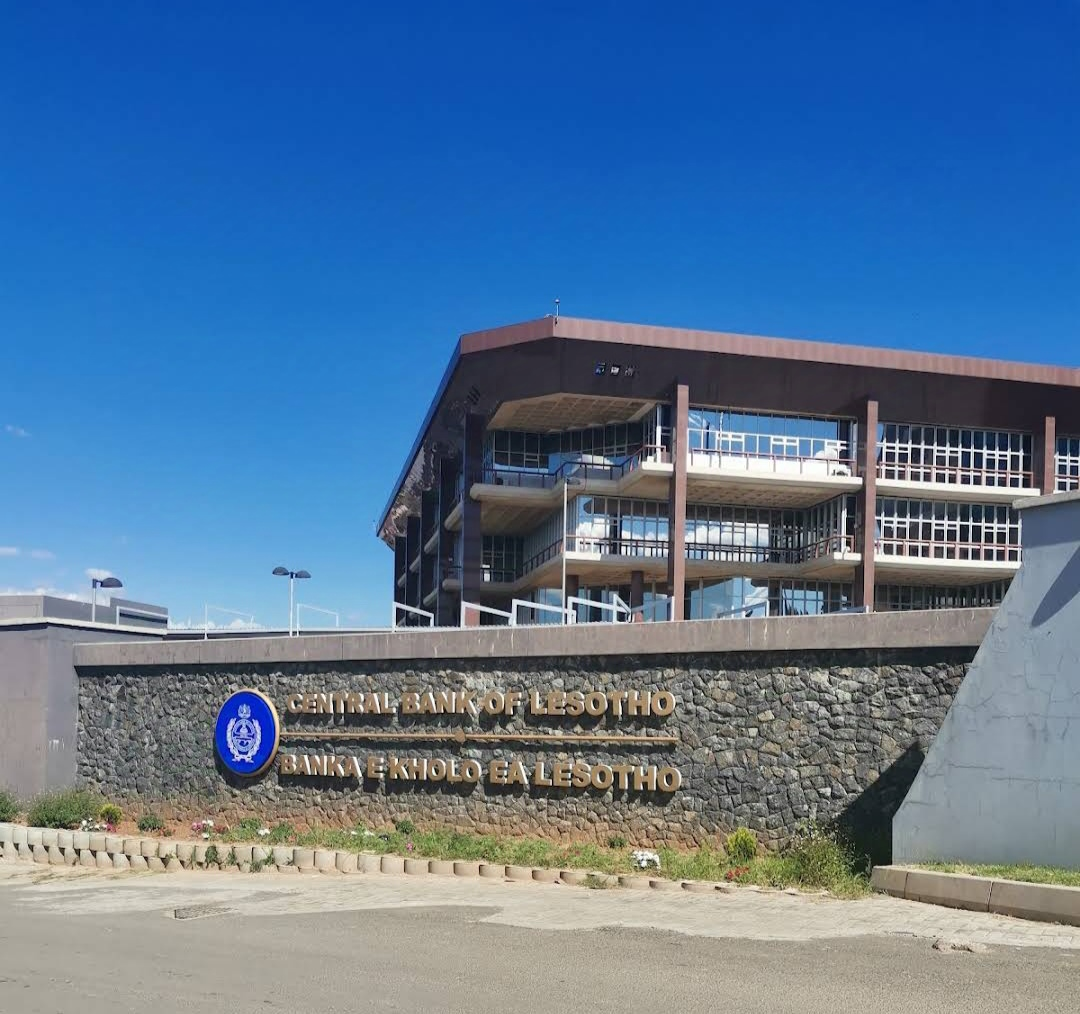
- Established: 1978
- Ownership: 100% state ownership
- Governor: Emmanuel Maluke Letete
- Central bank of: Lesotho
- Currency: Loti; LSL (ISO 4217)
- Reserves: 840 million USD
- Preceded by: Retselisitsoe Matlanyane
- Website: www.centralbank.org.ls

The Central Bank of Lesotho (Sotho: Banka e Kholo ea Lesotho) is the central bank of Lesotho, in southern Africa. The bank is located in Maseru and its current governor is Dr. Emmanuel Letete (effective from June 2022). The bank was established in 1978 as the Lesotho Monetary Authority.

== Governors ==
- Kobeli Molemohi, 1979 - 1982
- Stefan Schönberg, November 1982 - November 1985
- Erik Lennart Karlsson, November 1985 - June 1988
- Anthony Mothae Maruping, July 1988 - May 1998
- Stephen Mustapha Swaray, 1998 - 2001
- Motlatsi Matekane, 2001 - 2006
- Moeketsi Senaoana, 2007 - 2011
- Retselisitsoe Matlanyane, January 2012 - Dec 2021
- Lehlomela Mohapi (acting), January 2022 - May 2022
- Emmanuel Letete , June 2022 – Present

== Other key people ==
Mr. P. L. Mohapi	First Deputy Governor
Vacant	Second Deputy Governor
Mr. F. Morokole	Director of Operations Department
Mr. B. Noosi	Acting Director of Other Financial Institutions Department
Mr. M. Thamae	Director of Financial Markets Department
Mrs. M. Morojele	Director of Human Resources Department
Mr. T. Makula	Director of Information & Communication Technology Department
Dr. T. Tlelima	Director of Research Department
Mr. N. Rantsane	Director of Corporate Affairs Department
Mrs. R. Ralebakeng	Director of Finance Department
Vacant	Director of Enterprise Risk Management Department
Mrs M. Mohale	Director of Internal Audit Department
Mrs. P. Tau	Director of Banking Supervision and Financial Stability Department
Mr. M. Sekoati	Director of Payment and Settlements Department
Dr. R. Masenyetse	Executive Assistant to the Governor
Mr. B. Matobo	Acting Director of Facilities Management and Protective Services Department

== See also ==
- List of central banks of Africa
- Economy of Lesotho
- List of central banks
- List of financial supervisory authorities by country
