= Mejametalana Airport =

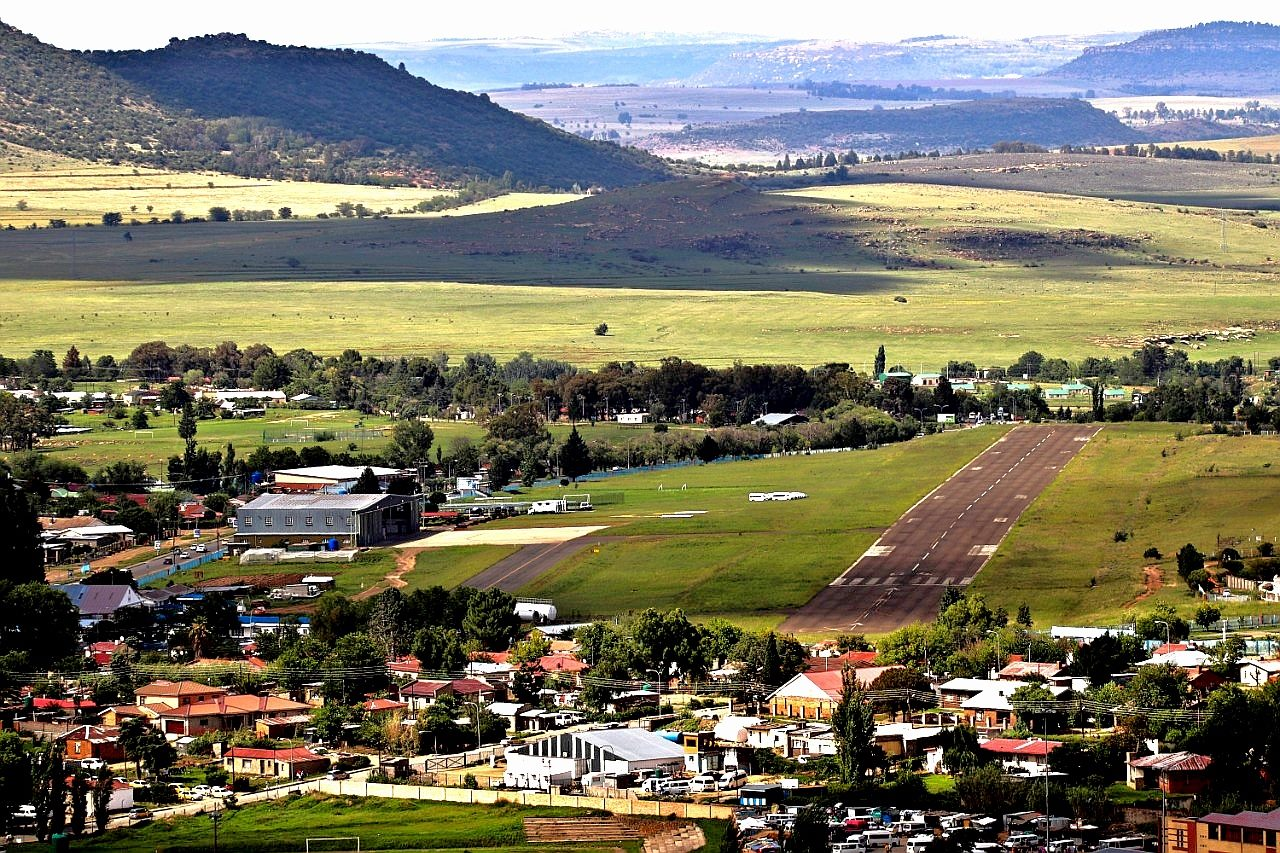
- IATA: none; ICAO: FXMU

Summary
- Airport type: Military
- Location: Maseru, Lesotho
- Elevation AMSL: 5,105 ft (1,556 m)
- Coordinates: 29°18′14″S 027°30′12″E
- Interactive map of Mejametalana Airport

Runways
| Direction | Length | | Surface |
| Direction | m | ft | Surface |
|---|---|---|---|
| 04/22 | 1,381 | 4,531 | Asphalt |
| 11/29 | 470 | 1,542 | Grass |
- Source: DAFIF

Mejametalana Airport (ICAO: FXMU) is a military airport in Maseru, the capital city of Lesotho. It served as Maseru's main airport until the opening of Moshoeshoe I International Airport, located in the town of Mazenod, about 18 km (11 mi) southeast of downtown Maseru.

== Facilities ==
The airport is at an elevation of 5,105 feet (1,556 m) above mean sea level. It has two runways: 04/22 with an asphalt pavement measuring 4,531 by 98 feet (1,381 m × 30 m) and 11/29 with a grass surface measuring 1,542 by 98 feet (470 m × 30 m).
