= Our Lady of Victories Cathedral, Maseru =

Coordinates: 29.316882°S 27.494871°E

Our Lady of Victories Cathedral
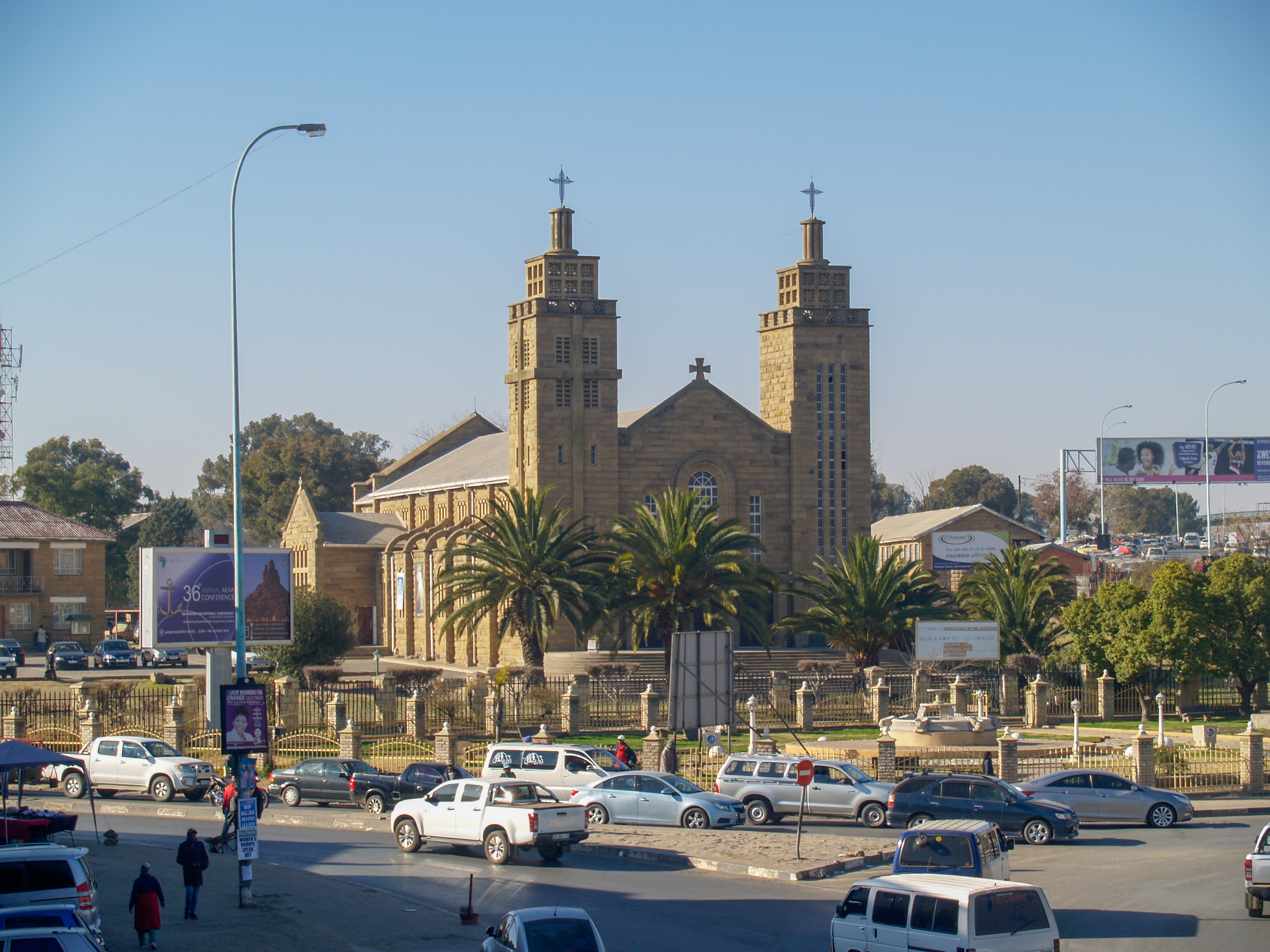
- Our Lady of Victories Cathedral
- Location: Maseru
- Country: Lesotho
- Denomination: Roman Catholic Church

The Our Lady of Victories Cathedral also known as the Cathedral of Maseru, is a Catholic Church located in the city of Maseru, Lesotho.

The construction of the church was completed in 1955 by a South African architect Eduard Hebertus Antonio Payens.

The church is governed by the Roman or Latin rite and functions as the headquarters of the Metropolitan Archdiocese of Maseru (Archidioecesis Maseruena) which was raised to its current status in 1961 by the Bull "Etsi priors" of Pope John XXIII.

It is under the pastoral responsibility of Archbishop Gerard Tlali Lerotholi and was visited by Pope John Paul II on his tour of several African countries in 1988.

== See also ==
- Catholic Church in Lesotho
- Our Lady of Victories Cathedral, Dakar
- Our Lady of Victories Cathedral, Yaoundé
