= Lesotho loti =

Currency of Lesotho

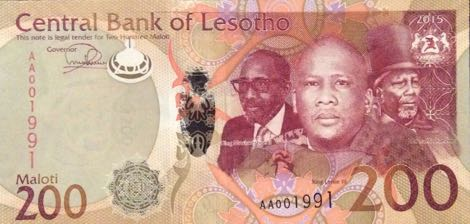
- 200 maloti

ISO 4217
- Code: LSL (numeric: 426) before 1985: LSM
- Subunit: 0.01

Unit
- Unit: loti
- Plural: maloti
- Symbol: L or M (pl.)

Denominations
- Subunit
- 1/100: sente
- Plural
- sente: lisente
- Banknotes: M10, M20, M50, M100, M200
- Coins: 1, 2, 5, 10, 20, 50 lisente, L1, M2, M5

Demographics
- User(s): Lesotho (alongside South African rand)

Issuance
- Central bank: Central Bank of Lesotho
- Website: www.centralbank.org.ls

Valuation
- Inflation: 6.8%
- Source: Central Bank of Lesotho, August 2006
- Method: CPI
- Pegged with: South African rand at par

The loti (plural: maloti) is the currency of the Kingdom of Lesotho. It is subdivided into 100 sente (pl. lisente). It is pegged to the South African rand on a 1:1 basis through the Common Monetary Area, and both are accepted as legal tender within Lesotho. The loti was first issued in 1966, albeit as a non-circulating currency. In 1980, Lesotho issued its first coins denominated in both loti and lisente (dated 1979) to replace the South African rand, but the rand remains legal tender.

The name derives from the Sesotho loti, "mountain," while sente is from English "cent".

In 1985, the ISO 4217 code was changed from LSM into LSL.

== Coins ==
In 1980, coins dated 1979 were introduced in denominations of 1 sente, 2, 5, 10, 25 and 50 lisente and 1 loti. In 1996, 2 and 5 maloti coins were introduced, followed by 20 lisente in 1998.

Coins in circulation are:

- 5 lisente
- 10 lisente
- 20 lisente
- 50 lisente
- 1 loti
- 2 maloti
- 5 maloti

== Banknotes ==
In January 1980, banknotes dated 1979 (the last two digits of the year of issue are the serial number prefix denominator) were introduced in denominations of 2, 5 and 10 maloti. 20 and 50 maloti notes were added in 1981, followed by 100 and 200 maloti in 1994.

On 1 March 2011, at a celebration marking its 30th anniversary, the Central Bank of Lesotho launched a new series of banknotes dated 2010 aimed at fighting the spread of counterfeits. The notes feature a portrait of the three royal family members: the current king, His Majesty Letsie III, is in the middle, his father King Moshoeshoe II is on the left, and the founder of the Basotho nation, King Moshoeshoe I, on the right.

In 2021, the Central Bank of Lesotho issued a new series of loti banknotes that are similar to the 2010 series, but the note's size is reduced to incorporate updated security features, including tactile features for those with visual impairments and giving the notes an anti-bacterial and anti-viral varnish to protect the notes from surface soiling and preventing viral disease on the notes.

2011 Series
Value	Dimensions	Main Color	Description		Date of issue	Date of first issue	Watermark
Value	Dimensions	Main Color	Obverse	Reverse	Date of issue	Date of first issue	Watermark
10 maloti	132 x 70 mm	Red	Mokorotlo hat registration device; King Moshoeshoe II, King Letsie III, and King Moshoeshoe I; Lesotho coat of arms	Cosmos flowers (Cosmos bipinnatus)	2010	March 1, 2011	Lesotho coat of arms and electrotype 10
20 maloti	139 x 70 mm	Blue	Mokorotlo hat registration device; King Moshoeshoe II, King Letsie III, and King Moshoeshoe I; Lesotho coat of arms	Basotho huts (mokhoro)	2010	March 1, 2011	Lesotho coat of arms and electrotype 20
50 maloti	146 x 70 mm	Purple	Mokorotlo hat registration device; King Moshoeshoe II, King Letsie III, and King Moshoeshoe I; Lesotho coat of arms	Men on horseback	2010	March 1, 2011	Lesotho coat of arms and electrotype 50
100 maloti	153 x 70 mm	Green	Mokorotlo hat registration device; King Moshoeshoe II, King Letsie III, and King Moshoeshoe I; Lesotho coat of arms	Shepherd with flock	2010	March 1, 2011	Lesotho coat of arms and electrotype 100
200 maloti	160 x 70 mm	Orange	Mokorotlo hat registration device; King Moshoeshoe II, King Letsie III, and King Moshoeshoe I; Lesotho coat of arms	Man on horse	2015	April 1, 2016	King Moshoeshoe I in top hat, electrotype 200 capped with Basotho hat, and Cornerstones

== See also ==
- Economy of Lesotho

Preceded by: South African rand Ratio: at par	Currency of Lesotho; 1980 – Concurrent with: South African rand (legal tender)	Succeeded by: Current
