= Mazenod, Lesotho =

Mazenod
- Community Council
- Geographic centre of community
- Coordinates: 29°27′51″S 27°29′49″E
- Country: Lesotho
- District: Maseru District
- Elevation: 5,161 ft (1,573 m)

Population (2006)
  - Total: 27,553
- Time zone: UTC+2 (CAT)
- Coordinates computed from Lesotho Villages file.

Mazenod is a community council located in the Maseru District of western Lesotho. The population in 2006 was 27,553. It is located to the south-east of the capital Maseru. Points of interest include Moshoeshoe I International Airport, Lesotho's only international airport.

== Education ==
Mazenod High School is a high school for boys and girls and boarding school for girls. Four Sisters of the Holy Names minister here as principal and teachers. Bishop De Mazenod High School its a school located in the western side of Mazenod. Mazenod Primary School Thabana-Ts'oana LECSA Primary School The Learning Hub

== Health care ==
Paki Health Centre provides nursing care, a well baby clinic, village health care workers and distribution of food to the needy.

== Villages ==
The community of Mazenod includes the villages of Baloing, Bothoba-Pelo, Fika-Le-Mohala, Folobanka, Ha 'Masana, Ha Au, Ha Chaka, Ha Cheboko, Ha Jimisi, Ha Jimisi (Taung), Ha Josiase, Ha Khele, Ha Lekhobanyane, Ha Malefane, Ha Maphatšoe, Ha Masenkane, Ha Matebesi, Ha Moalosi, Ha Motheo, Ha Paki, Ha Pomela, Ha Pshatlella, Ha Ralikoebe, Ha Ramorakane, Ha Sekepe, Ha Seqhatsi, Ha Setho, Ha Teko, Ha Teko (Matebeleng), Ha Thaabe, Ha Thabe, Ha Thokoa, Ha Tseka, Lithakoaneng, Machekoaneng, Ha Chaka, Ha Ngoatonyane, Ha Nko, Ha Rasebesoane, Ha Luka, Ha Takalimane, Ha Tlebere, Matukeng, Ha-Moli and Thot'a-Moli, Ha mphoto.
