= Moshoeshoe I International Airport =

Airport in Mazenod, Lesotho

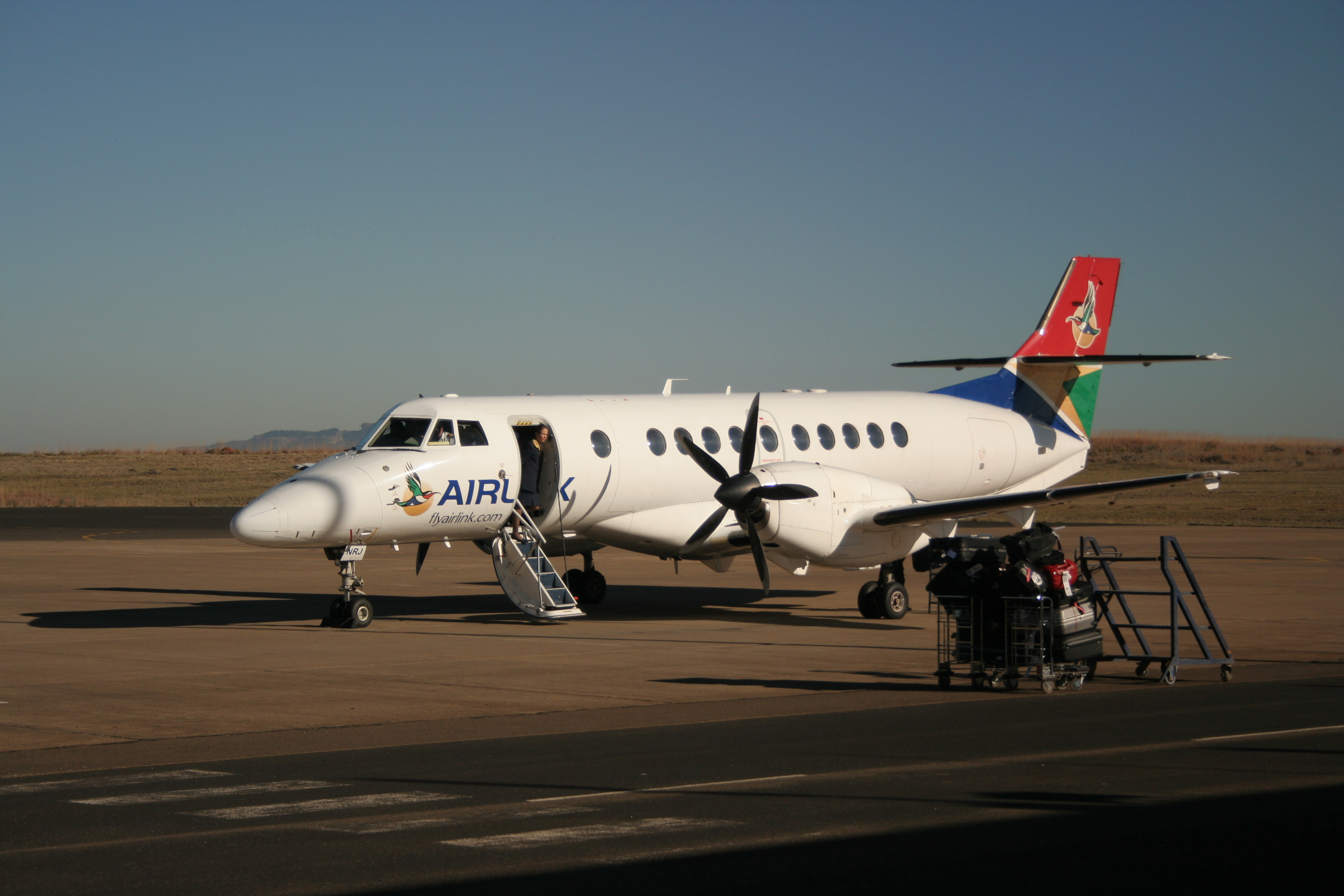
- IATA: MSU; ICAO: FXMM

Summary
- Airport type: Public
- Operator: Department of Civil Aviation
- Serves: Maseru, Lesotho
- Location: Mazenod
- Elevation AMSL: 5,348 ft (1,630 m)
- Coordinates: 29°27′44″S 027°33′09″E

Map
- Location of Airport in Lesotho

Runways
Direction	Length		Surface
Direction	m	ft	Surface
04/22	3,200	10,499	Asphalt
11/29	1,010	3,314	Asphalt
- Source: WAD GCM SkyVector

Moshoeshoe I International Airport (IATA: MSU, ICAO: FXMM) is an airport serving Maseru, the capital city of Lesotho. The airport is named in honor of Moshoeshoe I (1786–1870), king of Lesotho from 1822 to 1870. It is in the town of Mazenod, 18 km (11 mi) southeast of downtown Maseru.

== History ==
MSU was built in 1982 under the leadership of Leabua Jonathan's government. It was built to replace the older and outdated Mejametalana Airport so that MSU could handle Boeing 727s and give Lesotho a more efficient link to the world.

=== Controversies of relocating natives ===
In order to build the new airport, certain indigenous clans and tribes were forced to relocate.

== Facilities ==
The airport has an elevation of 5,348 feet (1,630 m) above mean sea level. It has two asphalt runways: 04/22 measuring 3,200 by 45 metres (10,499 ft × 148 ft) and 11/29 measuring 1,010 m × 23 m (3,314 ft × 75 ft).

== Airlines and destinations ==
Airlines	Destinations
Airlink	Johannesburg–O. R. Tambo

== See also ==
- Transport in Lesotho
- List of airports in Lesotho
