= Maseru =

Capital and largest city of Lesotho

- Capital city
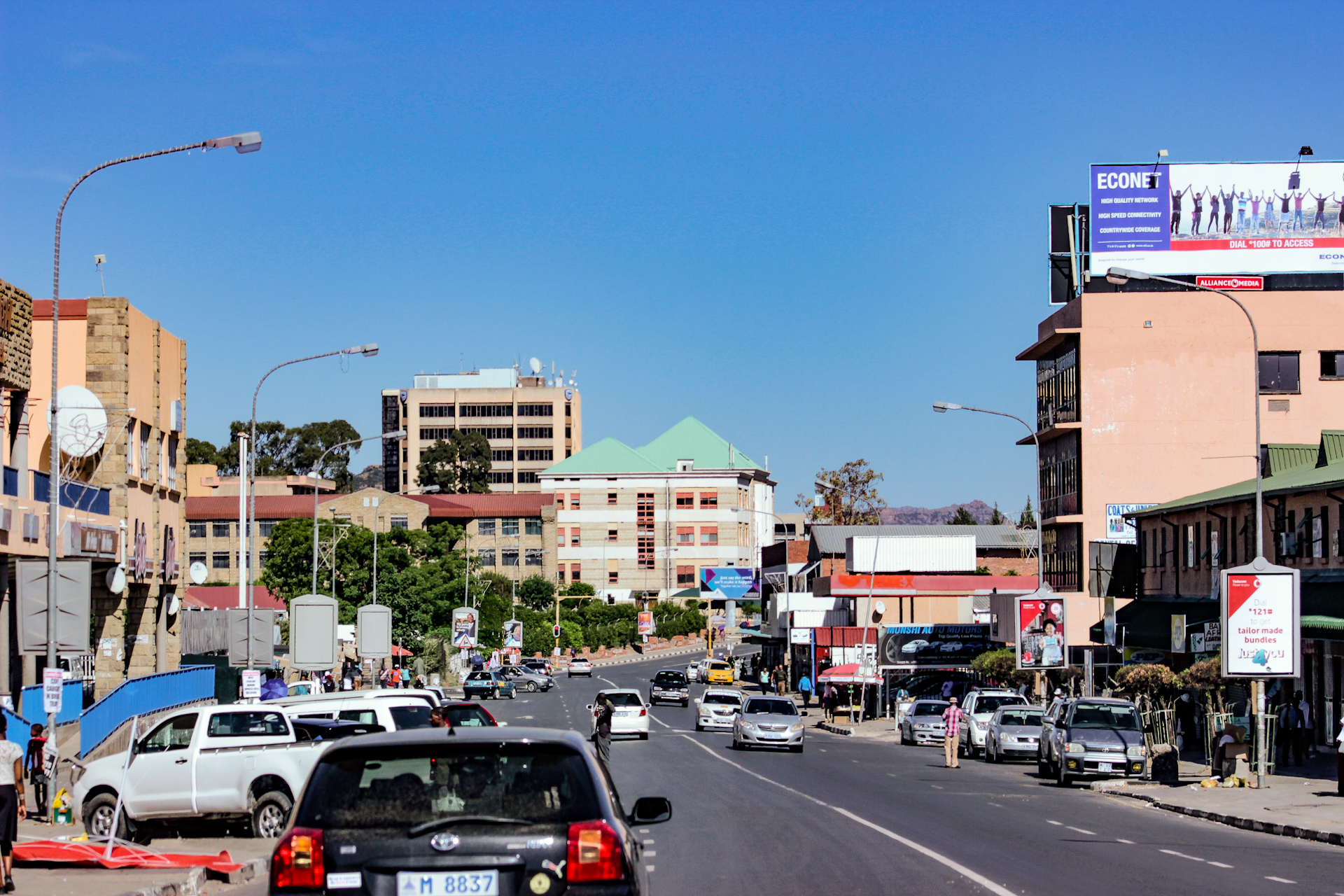
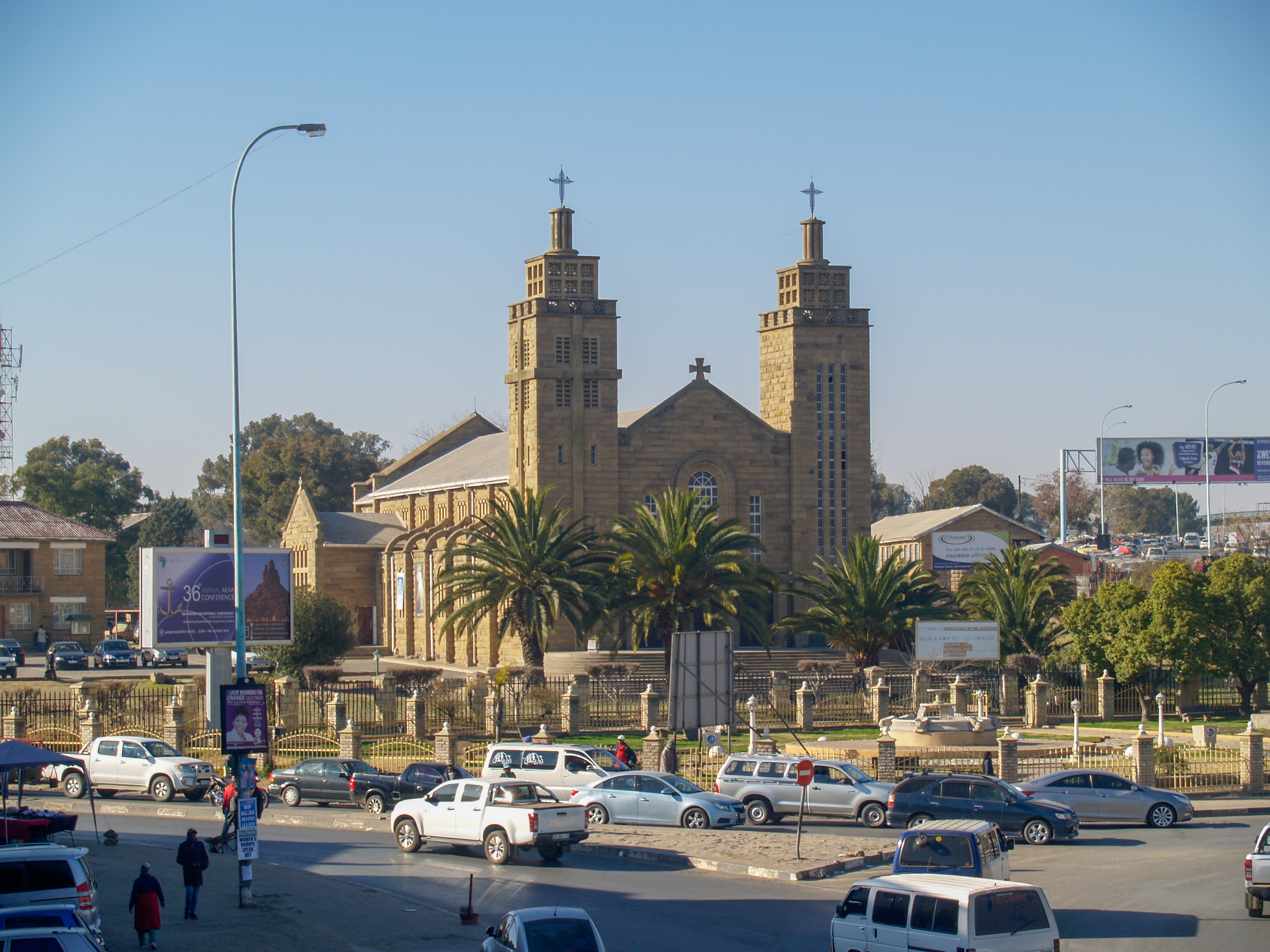
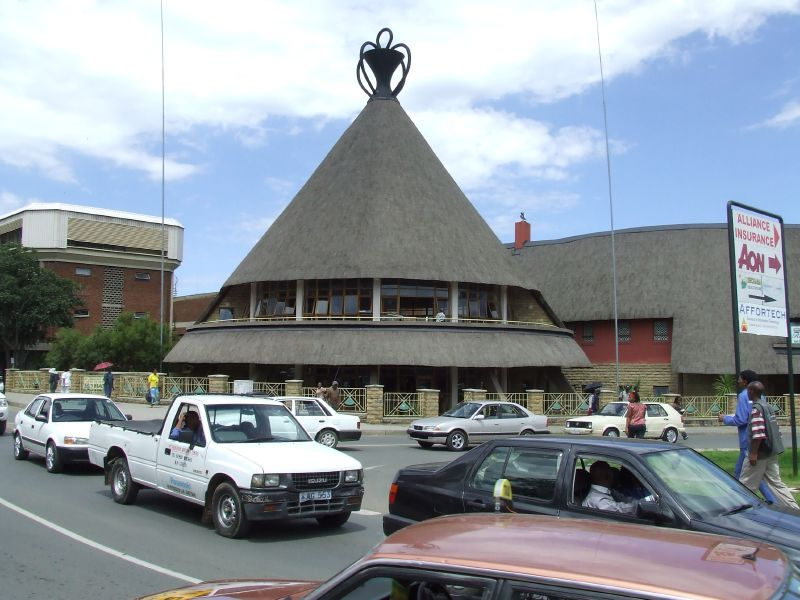
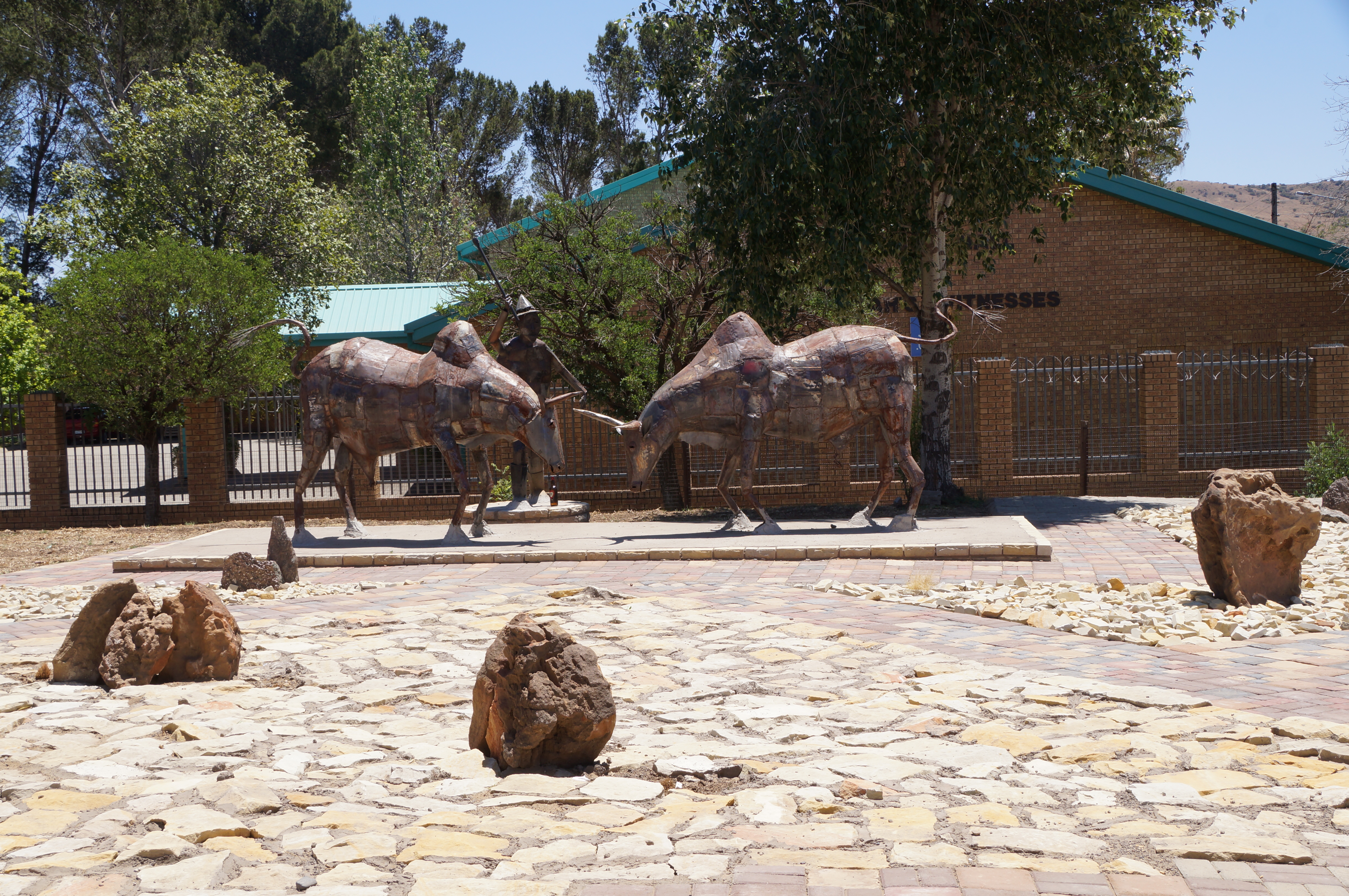
- Top: Downtown Maseru; Middle: Our Lady of Victories Cathedral, Basotho Hat Shop; Bottom: Honeymoon Park, Lesotho Parliament Building

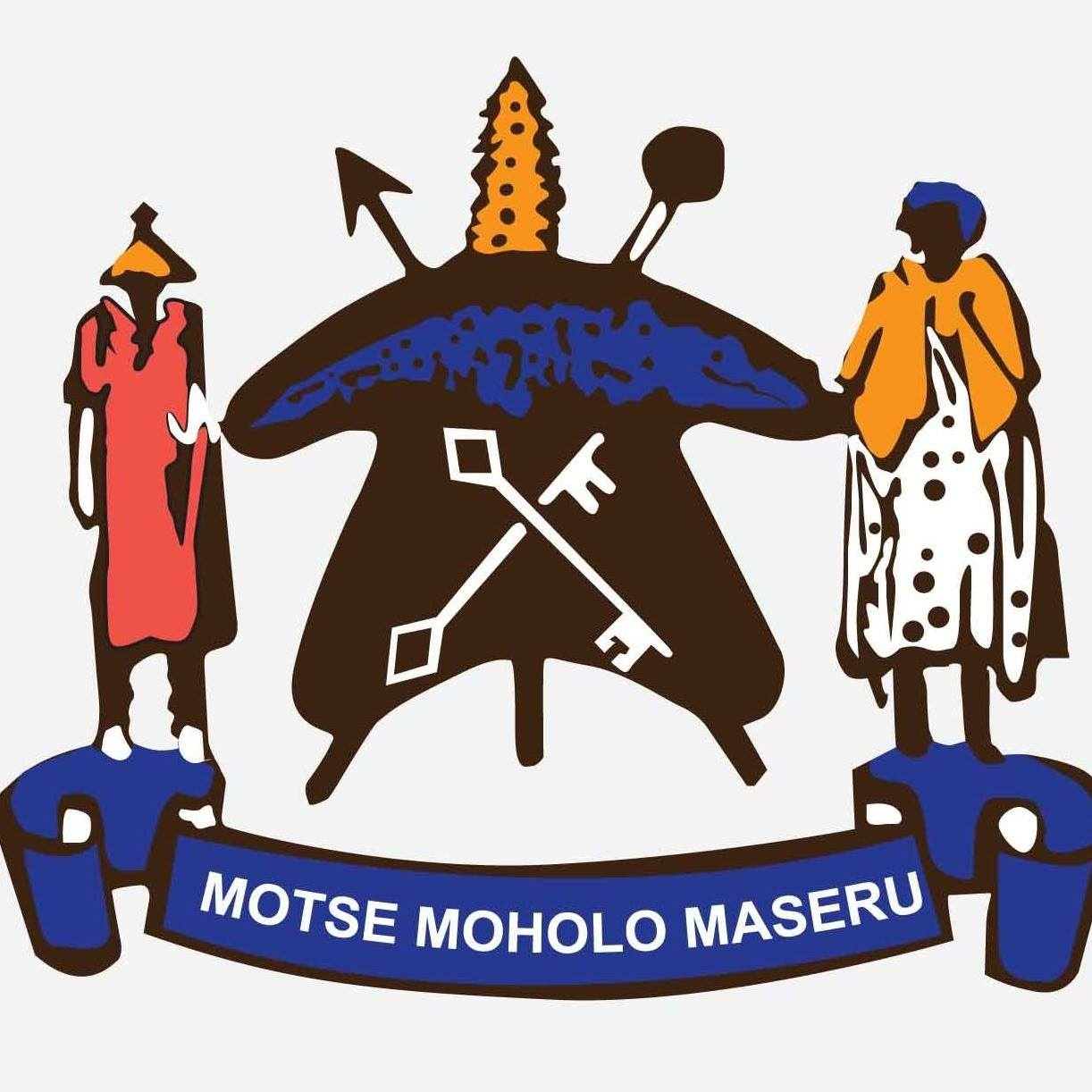
- Seal

- Location of Maseru in Lesotho Maseru (Africa)
- Coordinates: 29°18′54″S 27°29′13″E
- Country: Lesotho
- District: Maseru
- Constituency: Maseru
- Established: 1869

Area
  - Total: 137.5 km^{2} (53.1 sq mi)
- Elevation: 1,600 m (5,200 ft)

Population (2016 census)
  - Total: 330,760
  - Density: 2,397/km^{2} (6,210/sq mi)
- Time zone: UTC+02:00 (SAST)
- Climate: Cwb

Maseru is the capital and largest city of Lesotho. It is also the capital of the Maseru District. Located on the Caledon River, Maseru lies directly on the Lesotho–South Africa border. Maseru had a population of 330,760 in the 2016 census. The city was established as a police camp and assigned as the capital after the country became a British protectorate in 1869. When the country achieved independence in 1966, Maseru retained its status as capital. The name of the city is a Sesotho word meaning "red sandstones".

== History ==
Maseru was founded by the British as a small police camp in 1869, following the conclusion of the Free State–Basotho Wars when Basutoland became a British protectorate. Maseru is located at the edge of the "conquered territories" relinquished to the Orange Free State (now the Free State province of South Africa) as part of the peace terms. It was located 24 kilometres (15 mi) west of Basotho King Moshoeshoe I's stronghold of Thaba Bosiu, the previous de facto capital. A bustling market town soon grew around the area.

Maseru initially functioned as the state's administrative capital between 1869 and 1871, before administration of Basutoland was transferred to the Cape Colony. During their rule between 1871 and 1884, Basutoland was treated similarly to territories that had been forcefully annexed, much to the chagrin of the Basotho. This led to the Gun War in 1881 and the burning of many buildings in Maseru. In 1884, Basutoland was restored to its status as a Crown colony, and Maseru was again made capital. When Basutoland gained its independence and became the Kingdom of Lesotho in 1966, Maseru remained the country's capital.

Prior to Lesotho's independence, Maseru had remained relatively small; it was contained within well-defined colonial boundaries and had little room for growth, while the British had little interest in developing the city. After 1966 Maseru experienced rapid expansion: its area increased around sevenfold, from around 20 square kilometres (7.7 sq mi) to the current area of 138 square kilometres (53 sq mi), due to incorporation of nearby peri-urban villages to the city proper. The annual population growth rates remained around 7% for several decades, before tapering off to around 3.5% between 1986 and 1996.

After the 1998 parliamentary elections in Lesotho led to suspicions of vote fraud and a military intervention by South Africa, much of the city was damaged by riots and pillaging. The cost of repairing the damage done to the city was estimated at two billion rand (US$350 million), and until almost 2008, the effects of the riots could still be seen within the city.

== Geography ==
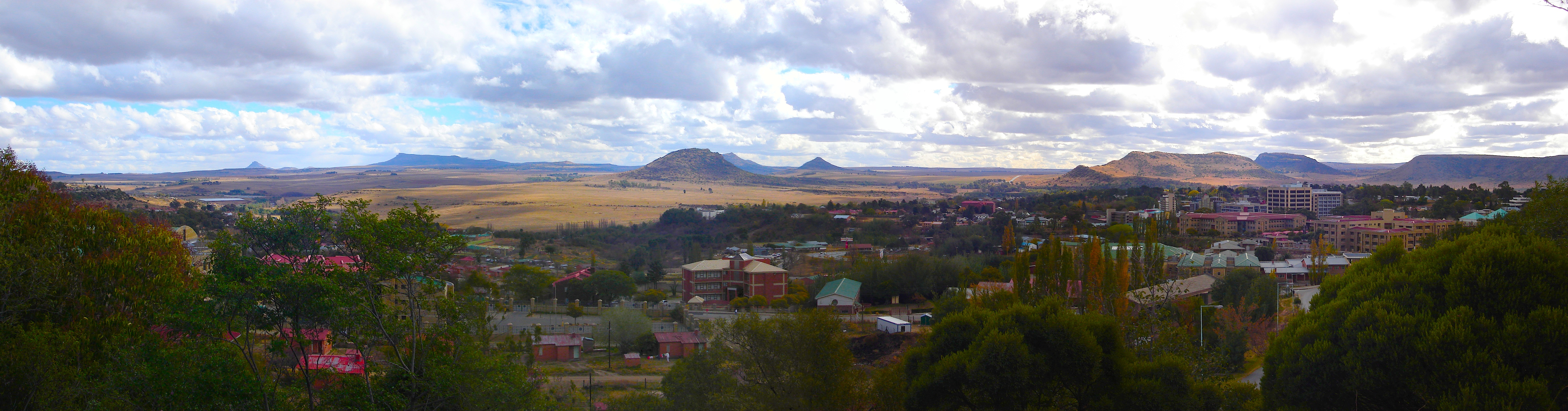
Panoramic view of Maseru in 2007

Maseru is located in northwest Lesotho by the South African border, denoted by the Mohokare River, also known as Caledon River. The two countries are connected by a border post at the Maseru Bridge, which crosses the river. On the South African side, Ladybrand is the town closest to Maseru. The city lies in a shallow valley at the foot of the Hlabeng-Sa-Likhama, foothills of the Maloti Mountains. The elevation of the city is listed as 1,600 metres (5,200 ft) above sea level. The city has an area of around 138 square kilometres (53 sq mi).

=== Climate ===
Maseru has a subtropical highland climate (Köppen climate classification: Cwb), with the city being categorised by warm, rainy summers and cool to chilly, dry winters. The average mean daily temperature during summer — from December to March in the Southern Hemisphere — is 21.5 °C (71 °F). During winter, between June and September, the average temperature is 9 °C (48 °F). The hottest month is January, with temperatures between 15 and 33 °C (59 and 91 °F). During the coldest month, July, the temperatures range from −3 to 17 °C (27 to 63 °F). The average rainfall ranges from 3 mm in July to 111 mm (4.4 inches) in January.

Climate data for Mejametala Airport (1991–2020)
Month	Jan	Feb	Mar	Apr	May	Jun	Jul	Aug	Sep	Oct	Nov	Dec	Year
Mean daily maximum °C (°F)	28.3 (82.9)	27.2 (81.0)	25.4 (77.7)	22.1 (71.8)	19.3 (66.7)	16.6 (61.9)	16.8 (62.2)	19.9 (67.8)	24.0 (75.2)	25.5 (77.9)	26.5 (79.7)	27.8 (82.0)	23.3 (73.9)
Daily mean °C (°F)	21.4 (70.5)	20.6 (69.1)	18.8 (65.8)	14.8 (58.6)	11.2 (52.2)	8.1 (46.6)	7.9 (46.2)	11.2 (52.2)	15.5 (59.9)	17.6 (63.7)	19.1 (66.4)	20.6 (69.1)	15.6 (60.0)
Mean daily minimum °C (°F)	14.7 (58.5)	14.1 (57.4)	12.1 (53.8)	7.6 (45.7)	3.2 (37.8)	−0.4 (31.3)	−1.0 (30.2)	2.4 (36.3)	6.9 (44.4)	9.8 (49.6)	11.8 (53.2)	13.5 (56.3)	7.9 (46.2)
Average rainfall mm (inches)	147 (5.8)	121 (4.8)	98 (3.9)	56 (2.2)	28 (1.1)	19 (0.7)	12 (0.5)	17 (0.7)	27 (1.1)	61 (2.4)	94 (3.7)	106 (4.2)	786 (31.1)
Average rainy days (≥ 1 mm)	11.2	9.8	8.7	5.4	3.1	2.1	1.6	2.2	3.4	7.1	9.0	9.9	73.5
Source: World Meteorological Organization

Climate data for Maseru (1991–2020)
Month	Jan	Feb	Mar	Apr	May	Jun	Jul	Aug	Sep	Oct	Nov	Dec	Year
Mean daily maximum °C (°F)	28 (82)	27 (81)	25 (77)	22 (72)	19 (66)	17 (63)	17 (63)	20 (68)	24 (75)	25 (77)	26 (79)	28 (82)	23 (74)
Mean daily minimum °C (°F)	15 (59)	14 (57)	12 (54)	8 (46)	3 (37)	0 (32)	−1 (30)	2 (36)	7 (45)	10 (50)	12 (54)	13 (55)	8 (46)
Average precipitation mm (inches)	147 (5.8)	121 (4.8)	98 (3.9)	56 (2.2)	28 (1.1)	19 (0.7)	12 (0.5)	17 (0.7)	27 (1.1)	61 (2.4)	94 (3.7)	106 (4.2)	786 (31.1)
Average precipitation days (≥ 1 mm)	11	10	9	5	3	2	2	2	3	7	9	10	73
Average relative humidity (%)	58.2	62.4	63.1	61.8	57.0	54.4	50.9	42.6	39.4	45.1	50.5	53.0	53.2
Mean monthly sunshine hours	282.1	243.6	254.2	237.0	254.2	237.0	260.4	275.9	276.0	279.0	276.0	294.5	3,169.9
Source 1: Danish Meteorological Institute
Source 2: World Meteorological Organization (1991–2020 Normals) & Lesotho Meteorological Services (Precipitation/Extremes)

== Demographics ==
The latest (2016) census lists the city's population at 330,760, or around one seventh of the entire population of the country, and half of the total urban population. The population of the city was at 98,017 by the 1986 census, and 137,837 by the 1996 census, demonstrating the early rapid expansion of the city after independence.

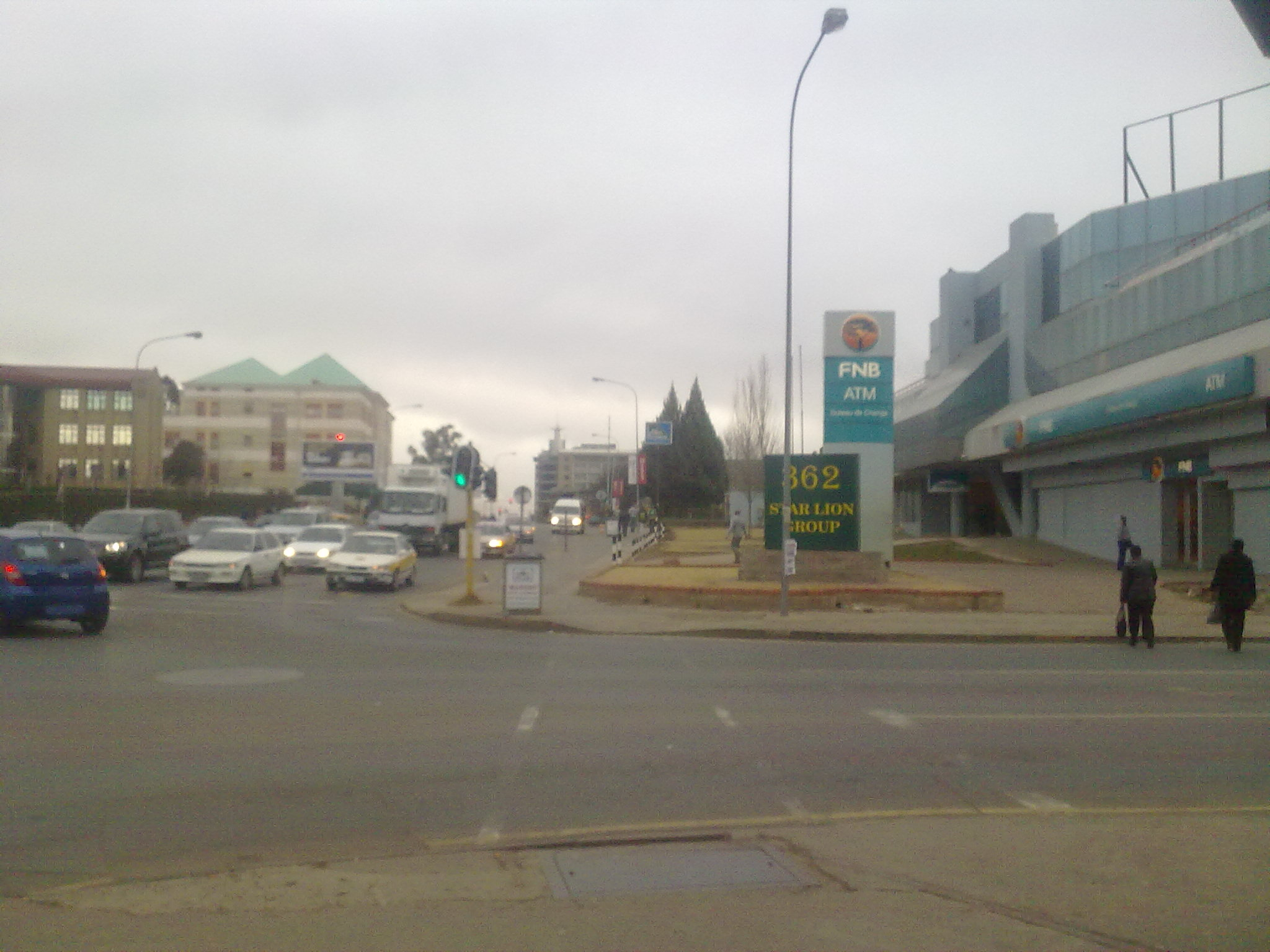
Kingsway traffic

== Transport ==
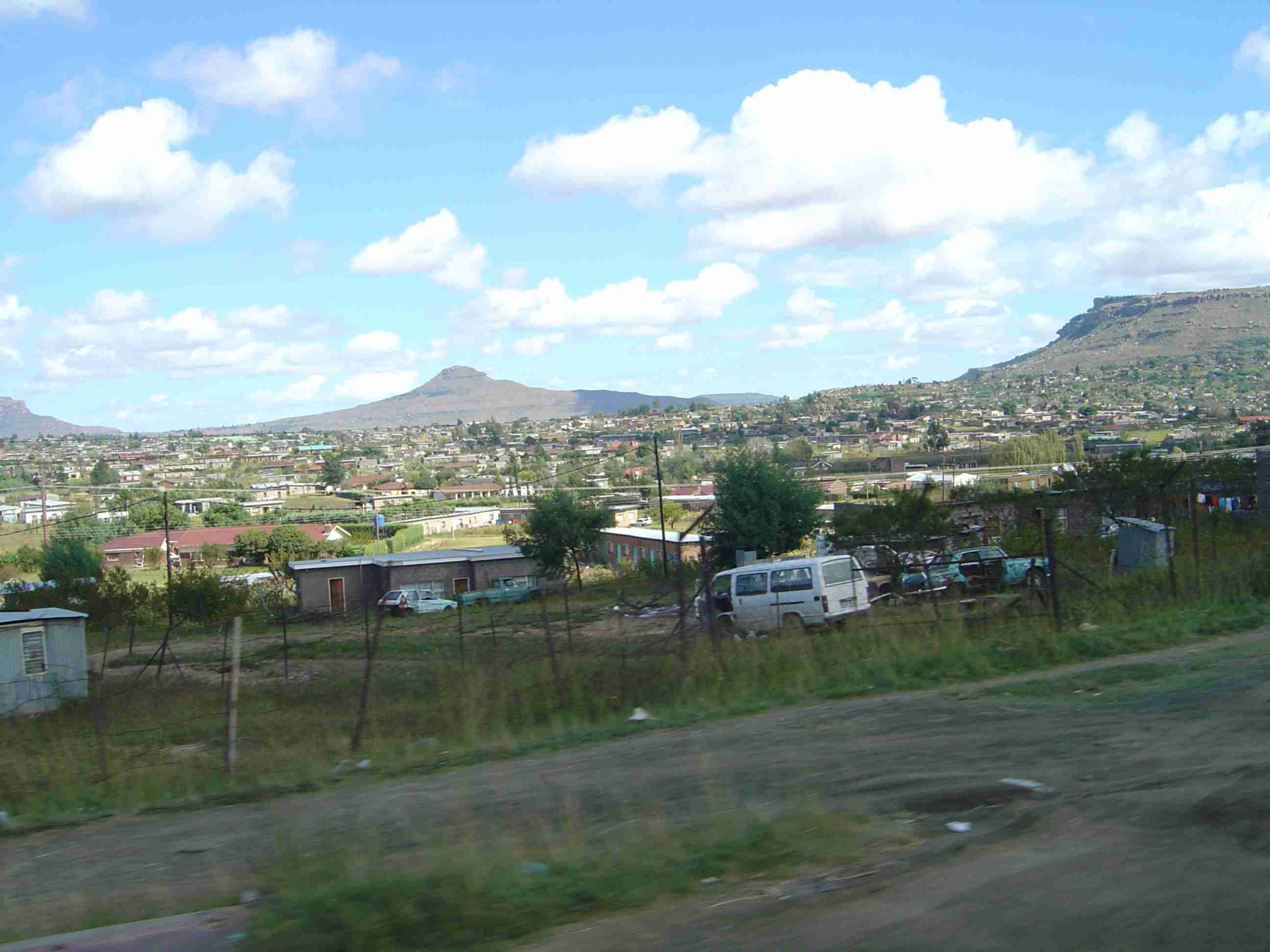
View from the main road south in Maseru

A railway line, built in 1905, bridges the Mohokare River to connect Maseru with Marseilles on South Africa's Bloemfontein–Bethlehem main line. There is no passenger traffic.

Kingsway, the road joining the former Leabua Jonathan Airport, now Mejametalana Airport and the Royal Palace in Maseru, was the first paved road in Lesotho. Having previously been just a dirt path, it was renovated in 1947 for the visit of members of the British royal family. It remained the only paved road in the country until Lesotho's independence in 1966. Two main roads lead outside of Maseru, Main North 1 to the northeast and Main South 1 to the southeast toward Mazenod and Roma. The South African N8 road leads from the Maseru Bridge border post west towards Ladybrand and Bloemfontein.

An international airport called the Moshoeshoe I International Airport is nearby, at Thoteng-ea-Moli, Mazenod. The National University of Lesotho is located in Roma, 32 kilometres (20 mi) from Maseru.

== Economy ==
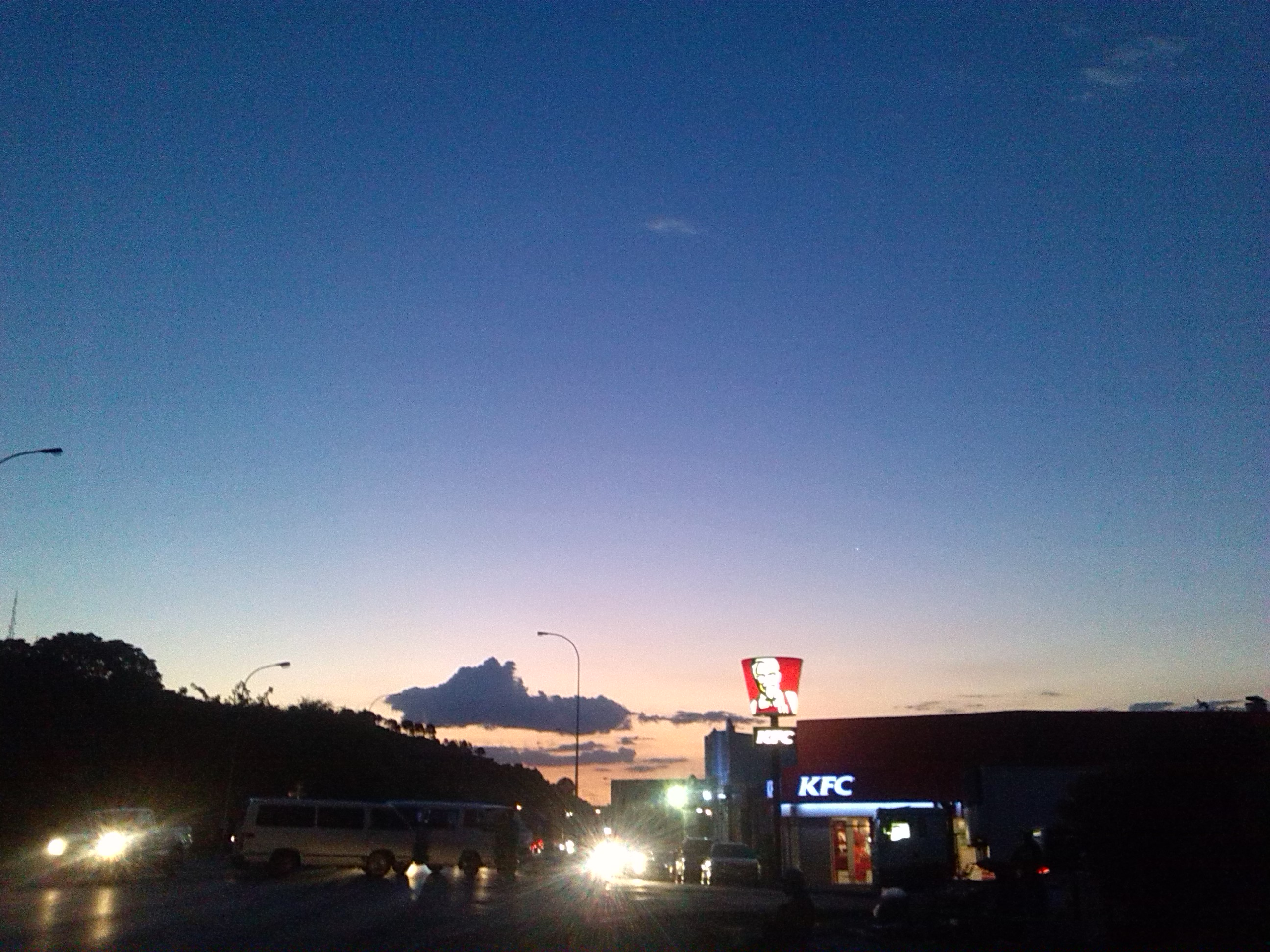
View from Main North 1, uptown Maseru at dusk

The commerce in the city is centred on two neighbouring central business districts, which have developed around Kingsway and serve as major employment centres. The western business district holds larger office buildings, department stores and several banks. The eastern business district hosts mainly smaller businesses, markets and street vendors. The central business districts are the largest employment centres within the city.

Maseru's economy has growing at a very rapid speed, particularly through foreign investment and tourism, since Lesotho's independence from Britain. The growth was disrupted by political unrest in 1998, which caused significant economic damage. Since the riots, the city has worked hard to recover from the effects of the unrest.

Maseru's industry is split into two main areas. The one to the north of the central business districts along Moshoeshoe Road holds flour mills and other major companies. The other industrial sector is in the south of the city at Thetsane district, and houses mainly textile and footwear companies.

Up until 2004 Maseru had a growing textile industry supported by and invested in by Chinese manufacturing concerns. Since the expiration of the Multi Fibre Arrangement the textile industry in Lesotho has diminished. Trump's 2025 tariffs further upended the textile industry. The city's products once included candles, carpets and mohair products but these have been overshadowed by South African industries.

== Places of worship ==
Most places of worship in the city are Christian churches and temples, including churches of the Apostolic Faith Mission of South Africa, Zion Christian Church, Anglican Church of Southern Africa, and Roman Catholic Archdiocese of Maseru (including its cathedral, Our Lady of Victories Cathedral). There are also Muslim mosques.

== Architecture ==
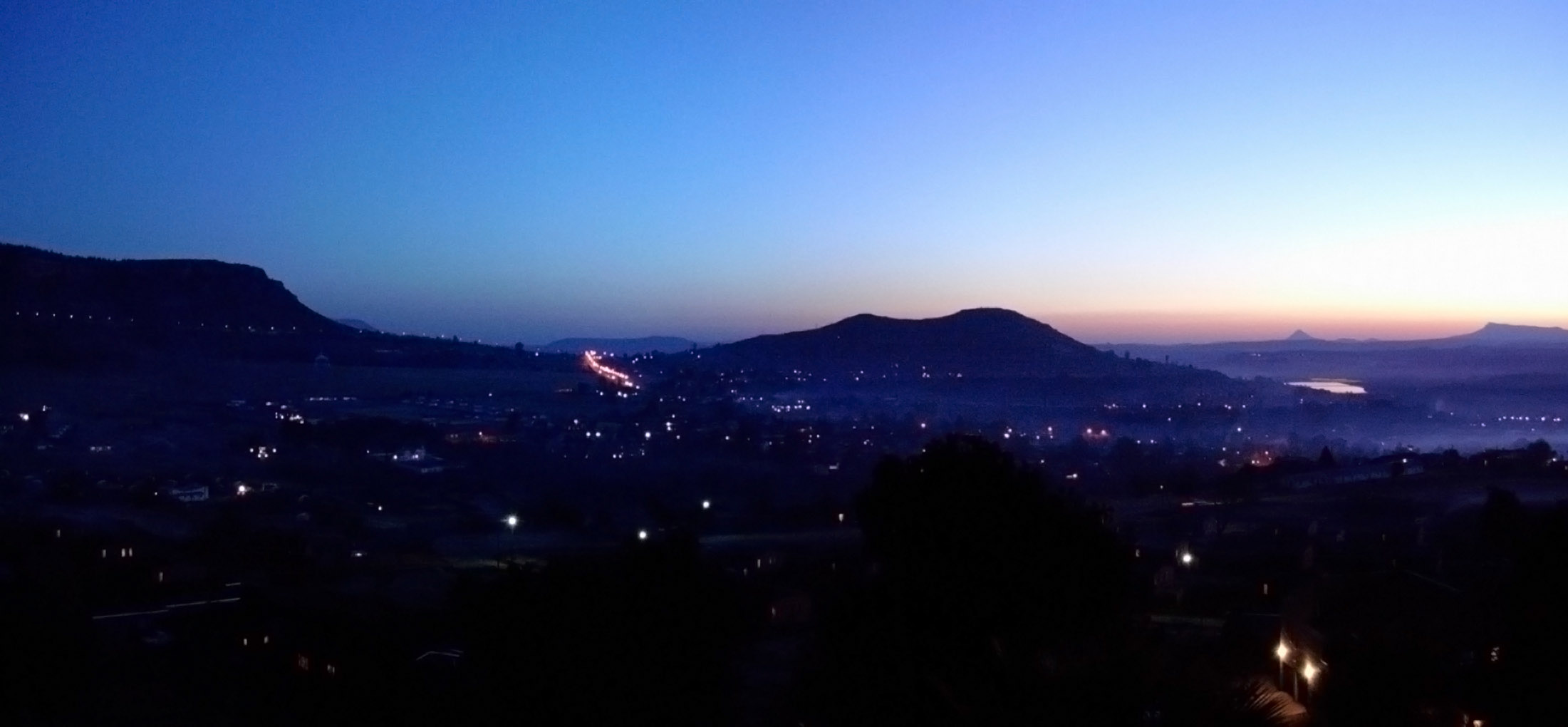
Maseru at night—view to the south. The city centre is to the right

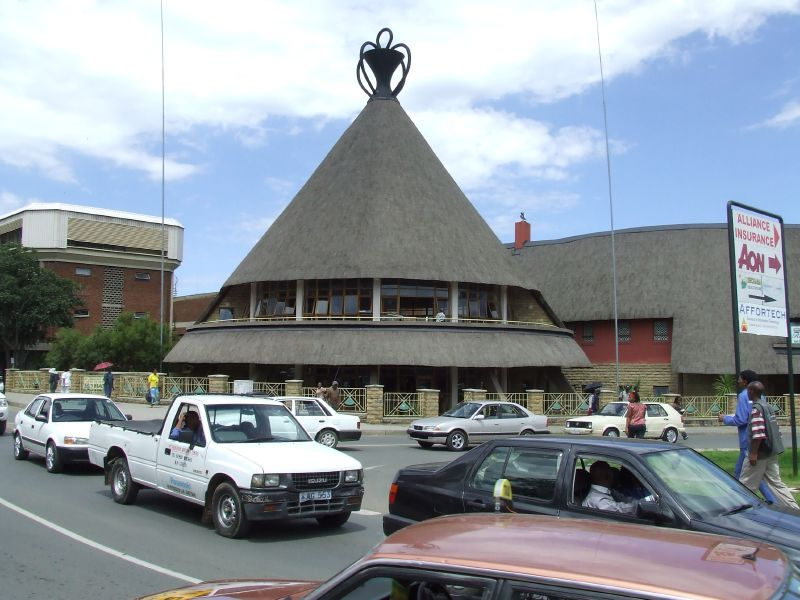
Basotho Hat Shop

Most of the traditional thatched-roof mud-brick houses, called rondavels, have been replaced with modern housing and office blocks which have a tint of traditional architecture. There have recently been some new buildings in the centre of the city, particularly the building across LNDC centre which now house shops, offices and the new building of the Ministry of Health which was completed in late 2007.

Buildings destroyed in the 1998 political uprising have been rebuilt. The New Lehakoe National sports centre, which is in between the central Bank of Lesotho and the colonial parliament building is equipped with tennis courts, swimming pools, conference centres, bars and gymnasiums. In November 2009, Pioneer Mall opened, providing Maseru with a South African style shopping mall, with many stores, such as a four-screen cinema-which later closed- and restaurants. Pioneer Mall opened way for more modern buildings in the city, the likes of Maseru mall and City Square centre

There are some colonial-era buildings around the centre of the city, most notably the Cathedral of Our Lady of Victories of the Roman Catholic Archdiocese of Maseru, and the Anglican St. John's Church. Other sights include the Royal Palace, the Parliament building and the State House.

== Sports ==
Lesotho's national stadium, the multi-purpose Setsoto Stadium, is located in Maseru. It has a capacity of between 20,000 and 25,000 people. The stadium is mostly used for football matches and houses the Lesotho national football team, but also holds events in athletics.

12 out of 16 of the teams playing in the Lesotho Premier League reside in Maseru. As of 2020, 36 out of the 51 championships contested in the league have gone to Maseru-based teams. Most successful of these have been Matlama FC with ten championship wins and the football team Lesotho Defence Force FC, with eight championship wins.

== Twin towns – sister cities ==
List of sister cities of Maseru, designated by Sister Cities International.

- Austin, United States
- Ceuta, Spain

== Bibliography ==
- Paul Tiyambe Zeleza; Dickson Eyoh, eds. (2003). "Maseru, Lesotho". Encyclopedia of Twentieth-Century African History. Routledge. ISBN 0415234794.
