= List of people from Lesotho =

Flag of Lesotho

This is a list of notable people from Lesotho. They include people people who were either born/raised or have lived for a significant period of time in Lesotho.

== Actors and film people ==
- Bokang Phelane, film and television actress
- Kaizer Matsumunyane, filmmaker
- Liteboho Molise, actress
- Matli Mohapeloa, actor
- Tseko Monaheng, actor

== Lawyers ==
- 'Neile Alina 'Mantoa Fanana, one of the first women lawyers from Lesotho
- Kellelo Justina Mafoso-Guni, former justice on the African Court on Human and People's Rights
- Nthomeng Majara, former chief justice of Lesotho
- Tjeka-Tjeka, activist, lawyer, entrepreneur, media influencer

== Visual and musical artists ==
- Maleh
- Leomile Motsetsela
- Malome Vector
- Tsepo Tshola

== Politicians and people in government ==
- Limpho Tau, politician and senator
- Moeketsi Majoro, prime minister and economist
- Motlalentoa Letsosa, politician
- 'Mamphono Khaketla, mathematician, senator, and minister
- 'Mamoshebi Kabi, politician
- Phakiso Mochochoko, diplomat and a founder of the International Criminal Court
- Mathibeli Mokhothu, deputy prime minister
- Mamonaheng Mokitimi, president of the Senate of Lesotho
- Pakalitha Mosisili, prime minister
- 'Makabelo Mosothoane, politician and minister
- Ntlhoi Motsamai, first woman speaker of the National Assembly
- Lekhetho Rakuoane, politician
- 'Matšepo Ramakoae, politician
- Ntoi Rapapa, politician, CEO, and physics professor
- Likeleli Tampane, politician and minister
- 'Masenate Mohato Seeiso, Queen of Lesotho
- Leabua Jonathan, Prime minister of Lesotho

== Scientists and academics ==
- Nthabiseng Mokoena, archaeologist with the National University of Lesotho
- Joshua Pulumo Mohapeloa, choral music composer and teacher

== Sports people ==
- Jane Thabantšo, footballer
- Katleho Makateng, plays as a forward
- Lehlohonolo Seema, football coach
- Lekunutu Tseounyane (born 1983), footballer who currently plays as a goalkeeper
- Lengana Nkhethoa (born 1978), footballer who currently plays as a defender
- Lire Phiri, footballer who currently plays as a midfielder
- Michelle Tau, taekwondo
- Mochini Matete, footballer
- Mohapi Ntobo (born 1984), footballer who currently plays as a defender
- Moitheri Ntobo (born 1979), footballer
- Mokheti Matsora, footballer who currently plays as a striker
- Mokone Marabe, footballer who currently plays as a striker
- Molefe Lekoekoe, footballer who plays as a midfielder
- Moli Lesesa (born 1984), footballer who currently plays as a midfielder
- Mosito Lehata, athlete primarily known as a 100-meter runner
- Motheo Mohapi (born 1968), former footballer who played as a midfielder
- Motlalepula Mofolo (born 1986), footballer
- Motlatsi Maseela (born 1971), former footballer who played as a defender
- Mpitsa Marai (born 1980), retired footballer and coach
- Neo Makama (born 1981), footballer who plays as a striker
- Nkau Lerotholi, footballer who plays as a defender
- Nyakhane Nyakhane, footballer who currently plays as a midfielder
- Sera Motebang, footballer
- Taeli Ramashalane, footballer
- Tatolo Mphuthing (born 1979), footballer who currently plays as a midfielder
- Teele Nts'onyana (born 1970), former footballer who played as a striker
- Thabane Rankara (born 1978), footballer
- Thabiso Maile (born 1987), footballer who plays as a defender
- Thabo Masualle (born 1982), footballer who currently plays as a defender
- Thapelo Mokhele (born 1986), football defender
- Thapelo Tale (born 1988), striker
- Tšoanelo Koetle, footballer
- Tsoloane Mosakeng (born 1977), footballer who currently plays as a midfielder
- Tumelo Khutlang, footballer who plays as a forward

== Writers ==
- Sheila Khala, poet
- ’Masechele Khaketla

== See also ==
- List of Lesotho prime ministers
