= Football in Lesotho =

- Country: Lesotho
- Governing body: Lesotho Football Association
- National team: Men's national team
- Clubs: Lesotho Premier League

International competitions
- Champions League; CAF Confederation Cup; Super Cup; FIFA Club World Cup; FIFA World Cup (National Team); African Cup of Nations (National Team)

The sport of football in the country of Lesotho is run by the Lesotho Football Association. The association administers the national football team, as well as the Premier League. Football is the most popular sport in the country.

== National association ==
The Lesotho Football Association was founded in 1932 and renamed, in 1992, as "Lesotho Football Association" (LEFA). In 1964, they joined FIFA and the CAF.

== Men's domestic football ==
The Lesotho Premier League was founded in 1970 as the highest national league. At times it bore the names of sponsors. For example, during the 2013/14 season it was called the Vodacom Premier League. Most clubs come from the capital, Maseru. Some clubs are associated with institutions such as the army, police and the judiciary. The annual highlight is the Lesotho Independence Cup, cup games held for the independence celebrations on 4 October, in which four teams each participate.

The People's Cup was founded in 2023, with fans voting for teams to compete. The four most-voted teams compete for the prize.

Previous cups include the Lesotho Independence Cup, the Top 8 and the Vodacom Soccer Spectacular.

== Men's national team ==
The national team of Lesotho played their first international match in 1970, a 2–1 victory against Malawi. They have not qualified for a FIFA World Cup or Africa Cup of Nations yet.

Their highest position in the FIFA World Ranking was 105th in August 2014. They are currently ranked 147th (as of December 2022).

From 2004 to 2006, the German Antoine Hey coached the national side. The ambitious goal was the qualification for the 2010 World Cup in neighbouring South Africa. However, after one and a half years, Hey was dismissed for failing. The successor was the Serb Zavisa Milosavljevic, who was also dismissed in September 2009 and was replaced by Lesotho native Leslie Notši, who was previously the assistant coach of the national team. In 2014 Seephephe "Mochini" Matete trained the team, a former international. Moses Maliehe became the coach in 2016.

The biggest success of the national team was reaching the final in the regional competition of the COSAFA Cup 2000. In 2004 they could have, for the first time, qualified for a team for an under 20 national continental championship.

The nickname of the national team is Likuena (Sesotho for "the crocodiles").

== Women's football ==
The country has a women's national team, ranked in the Women's FIFA rankings. The top national division is the Lesotho Women's Super League.

== Stadium and technical centre ==
In the 1980s, the "Setsoto Stadium" was built in the capital Maseru. The project was originally directed and funded by North Korea. Under pressure from the South African government, the North Koreans had to leave the country. In 2002, the new Setsoto Stadium was inaugurated by then FIFA President Sepp Blatter. Setsoto is the Sesotho word for "The Wonderful" or "The Amazement". Maseru's "technical centre" was the Bambatha Tsita Sports Arena, which has a football school, a fitness center and two saunas. The cost of the Sports Arena was about $800,000, of which FIFA took over and paid $400,000 as part of the Goal project.

Other football fields in Lesotho are often very simple, with no spectator stands.

== Football stadiums in Lesotho ==
The largest stadium by capacity in Lesotho is the 13,900-capacity Setsoto Stadium.

Stadium	Capacity	City	Image
Setsoto Stadium	13,900	Maseru	
