= 2000 COSAFA Cup =

Tournament details
- Teams: 11 (from 1 confederation)

Final positions
- Champions: Zimbabwe (1st title)
- Runners-up: Lesotho

Tournament statistics
- Matches played: 12
- Goals scored: 29 (2.42 per match)

The 2000 COSAFA Cup is the 4th edition of the football tournament that involves teams from COSAFA. Zimbabwe beat Lesotho 3–0 in the final for their first COSAFA Cup title.

== First round ==
Seychelles and Madagascar registered for the tournament following their admission to COSAFA (like Mauritius) but were excluded from participation due to 'budgetary constraints'.

Winners of the first round advanced to the quarter-finals.

March 5, 2000

Zimbabwe	2–1	Lesotho
Joel Lupahla 69'; Mpitsa Marai 89' (o.g.)		Masupha Majara 9'

National Stadium, Harare
March 25, 2000

Zambia	3–0	Botswana
Mark Sinyangwe 7'; Harry Milanzi 32'; Chaswe Nsofwa 89'

Independence Stadium, Lusaka
April 15, 2000

Malawi	2–1	Mozambique
Daniel Chitsulo 5'; Mike Kumanga 9'		Amide 59'

Chichiri Stadium, Blantyre
April 29, 2000

South Africa	3–0	Mauritius
Patrick Mayo 13' (pen.); Godfrey Sapula 69'; Siyabonga Nomvete 78'

Royal Bafokeng Stadium, Phokeng

== Quarter-finals ==
- Angola (holders), Namibia, Swaziland received byes to the quarter-finals.
- Lesotho also entered as the best losers from the first round (on better disciplinary record compared to Mozambique).
May 14, 2000

Zimbabwe	3–2	Namibia
Luke Petros 67', 76'; William Mugeyi 68'		Collin Benjamin 79'; Robert Nauseb 89'

National Stadium, Harare
May 20, 2000

Malawi	0–0 (4–5 pen.)	Angola

Chichiri Stadium, Blantyre
June 11, 2000

Lesotho	0–0 (3–1 pen.)	Zambia

Setsoto Stadium, Maseru
June 18, 2000

South Africa	2–0	Swaziland
Delron Buckley 11', 18'

Johann van Riebeeck Stadium, Witbank

== Semi-finals ==
July 23, 2000

Lesotho	2–1	Angola
Motlatsi Maseela 84'; Teele Ntsonyana 89'		Akwá 30'

Setsoto Stadium, Maseru
July 29, 2000

South Africa	0–1	Zimbabwe
		Kaitano Tembo 11'

Boet Erasmus Stadium, Port Elizabeth

== Final ==
August 13, 2000

Lesotho	0–3	Zimbabwe
		Thabang Mahlakajoe 9' (o.g.); William Mugeyi 41'; Luke Petros 52'

Setsoto Stadium, Maseru
Attendance: 15,000
August 27, 2000

Zimbabwe	3–0	Lesotho
Luke Petros 15' (pen.); Robson Chisango 75'; Benjamin Mwaruwara 78'

Bulawayo
Attendance: 35,000

2000 COSAFA Cup

Zimbabwe
First title
