= List of current national association football team managers =

This is a list of the current managers of national teams in men's association football. Appointed by the country's association, a manager is responsible for selecting the team of players for the matches of the national team, among other duties.

The list encompasses all teams that are members, full or associate, of one of FIFA's six continental confederations: AFC (Asia), CAF (Africa), CONCACAF (North and Central America and the Caribbean), CONMEBOL (South America), OFC (Oceania), and UEFA (Europe). The great majority of those nations are also members of FIFA itself; where this is not the case, this is noted.

Unlike players, who must meet eligibility rules including holding legal nationality of the country they represent, and have very limited options for changing national team allegiance, managers are bound by no such restrictions; it is not uncommon for associations to hire foreign managers, and for managers to have been in charge of different national teams during their careers.

Managers of FIFA member national teams, along with captains of those teams and media representatives, are able to vote for nominees of The Best FIFA Men's Player award.

== AFC ==
The Asian Football Confederation has 47 members, one of which, the Northern Mariana Islands, is not affiliated with FIFA.

Team	Manager	Assumed role	Refs
Afghanistan	Vacant		(Note: Afghanistan, fifa.com)
Australia	(Australia) Tony Popovic	26 September 2024	(Note: Australia, fifa.com)
Bahrain	(Spain) Félix Sánchez	12 October 2026	(Note: Bahrain, fifa.com)
Bangladesh	(United States) Thomas Dooley	21 May 2026	(Note: Bangladesh, fifa.com)
Bhutan	(Australia) Gary Phillips	16 August 2026	(Note: Bhutan, fifa.com)
Brunei	(Brunei) Ali Mustafa	1 May 2026	(Note: Brunei, fifa.com)
Cambodia	(Japan) Koji Gyotoku	9 March 2025	(Note: Cambodia, fifa.com)
China	(China) Shao Jiayi	5 November 2025	(Note: China PR, fifa.com)
Chinese Taipei	(Australia) Matt Ross	23 October 2025	(Note: Chinese Taipei, fifa.com)
Guam	(Guam) Ross Awa	1 July 2023	(Note: Guam, fifa.com)
Hong Kong	(Spain) Roberto Losada	5 June 2026	(Note: Hong Kong, fifa.com)
India	(India) Khalid Jamil	13 August 2025	(Note: India, fifa.com)
Indonesia	(England) John Herdman	3 January 2026	(Note: Indonesia, fifa.com)
Iran	(Iran) Amir Ghalenoei	13 March 2023	(Note: Islamic Republic of Iran Football Federation, fifa.com)
Iraq	(Australia) Graham Arnold	9 May 2025	(Note: Iraq, fifa.com)
Japan	Vacant	18 November 2026	(Note: Japan, fifa.com)
Jordan	(Morocco) Ezzaki Badou	19 July 2026	(Note: Jordan, fifa.com)
Kuwait	(Portugal) Hélio Sousa	31 July 2025	(Note: Kuwait, fifa.com)
Kyrgyzstan	(Kyrgyzstan) Urmat Abdukaimov	25 August 2026	(Note: The Kyrgyz Football Union, fifa.com)
Laos	(Serbia) Vladica Grujic	January 2026	(Note: Laos, fifa.com)
Lebanon	(Algeria) Madjid Bougherra	28 January 2026	(Note: Lebanon, fifa.com)
Macau	(Macau) Emmanuel Noruega (caretaker)	1 January 2026	(Note: Macau, www-macaubusiness-com.webpkgcache.com)
Malaysia	(Malaysia) Tan Cheng Hoe (caretaker)	25 June 2026	(Note: Malaysia, fifa.com)
Maldives	(Hungary) István Urbányi	7 January 2026	(Note: Maldives, fifa.com)
Mongolia	(San Marino) Marco Ragini	16 May 2026	(Note: Mongolia, fifa.com)
Myanmar	(Norway) Joern Andersen	8 July 2026	(Note: Myanmar, fifa.com)
Nepal	Vacant		(Note: Nepal, fifa.com)
North Korea	(North Korea) Sin Yong-nam	1 January 2023	(Note: DPR Korea Football Association, fifa.com)
Northern Mariana Islands	(Japan) Atsushi Hanita	1 February 2025	(Note: Non-member of FIFA.)
Oman	(Morocco) Tarik Sektioui	22 March 2026	(Note: Oman, fifa.com)
Pakistan	(Peru) Nolberto Solano	21 July 2025	(Note: Pakistan, fifa.com)
Palestine	(Palestine) Ihab Abu Jazar	3 December 2024	(Note: Palestine, fifa.com)
Philippines	(Spain) Carles Cuadrat	24 July 2025	(Note: Philippines, fifa.com)
Qatar	(Spain) Julen Lopetegui	1 May 2025	(Note: Qatar, fifa.com)
Saudi Arabia	(Greece) Georgios Donis	23 April 2026	(Note: Saudi Arabia, fifa.com)
Singapore	(Singapore) Gavin Lee	24 June 2025	(Note: SGP, fifa.com)
South Korea	(Spain) Robert Moreno (caretaker)	1 September 2026	(Note: Korea Republic, fifa.com)
Sri Lanka	(Kuwait) Abdullah Al Mutairi	4 November 2024	(Note: Sri Lanka, fifa.com)
Syria	(Spain) José Lana	22 August 2024	
Tajikistan	(North Macedonia) Igor Angelovski	30 April 2026	(Note: Tajikistan, fifa.com)
Thailand	(England) Anthony Hudson	22 October 2025	(Note: Thailand, fifa.com)
Timor-Leste	(Portugal) Zé Pedro	28 August 2025	(Note: Timor-Leste, fifa.com)
Turkmenistan	(Turkmenistan) Rovshen Meredov	26 May 2025	(Note: Turkmenistan, fifa.com)
United Arab Emirates	(Croatia) Zlatko Dalić	12 August 2026	(Note: United Arab Emirates, fifa.com)
Uzbekistan	(Italy) Fabio Cannavaro	6 October 2025	(Note: Uzbekistan, fifa.com)
Vietnam	(South Korea) Kim Sang-sik	3 May 2024	(Note: Vietnam, fifa.com)
Yemen	(Algeria) Noureddine Ould Ali	1 February 2024	(Note: Yemen, fifa.com)

== CAF ==
The Confederation of African Football has 54 full members, and two associate members not affiliated with FIFA: Réunion and Zanzibar.

Team	Manager	Assumed role	Refs
Algeria	(Algeria) Brahim Hemdani	5 September 2026	(Note: Algeria, fifa.com)
Angola	(Senegal) Aliou Cissé	8 April 2026	(Note: Angola, fifa.com)
Benin	(Germany) Gernot Rohr	28 February 2023	(Note: Benin, fifa.com)
Botswana	(Botswana) Thaloba Nthaga (caretaker)	12 September 2026	(Note: Botswana, fifa.com)
Burkina Faso	(Comoros) Amir Abdou	28 February 2026	(Note: Burkina Faso, fifa.com)
Burundi	(Belgium) Patrick Sangwa	29 October 2024	(Note: Burundi, fifa.com)
Cameroon	(Cameroon) David Pagou	1 December 2025	(Note: Cameroon, fifa.com)
Cape Verde	(Cape Verde) Humberto Bettencourt	19 August 2026	(Note: Cape Verde, fifa.com)
Central African Republic	(Morocco) Abdelaziz Karkache	6 November 2026	(Note: Central African Republic, fifa.com)
Chad	(Switzerland) Raoul Savoy	1 August 2025	(Note: Chad, fifa.com)
Comoros	(France) Hubert Velud	7 March 2026	(Note: Comoros, fifa.com)
Congo	Vacant	18 November 2026	(Note: Congo, fifa.com)
DR Congo	(France) Sébastien Desabre	8 August 2022	(Note: Congo DR, fifa.com)
Djibouti	(Djibouti) Mohamed Meraneh Hassan (caretaker)	27 January 2026	(Note: Djibouti, fifa.com)
Egypt	(Egypt) Ali Maher	7 November 2026	(Note: Egypt, fifa.com)
Equatorial Guinea	(Italy) Vincenzo Alberto Annese	26 August 2026	(Note: Equatorial Guinea, fifa.com)
Eritrea	(Egypt) Hesham Yakan	9 March 2026	(Note: Eritrea, fifa.com)
Eswatini	(Eswatini) Dominic Kunene (caretaker)	31 October 2026	(Note: Eswatini, fifa.com)
Ethiopia	(Ethiopia) Yohannes Sahle	5 January 2026	(Note: Ethiopia, fifa.com)
Gabon	(France) Sébastien Migné	15 July 2026	(Note: Gabon, fifa.com)
Gambia	(Northern Ireland) Johnny McKinstry	22 May 2024	
Ghana	(Sweden) Kim Björkegren (caretaker)	17 October 2026	(Note: Ghana, fifa.com)
Guinea	(Portugal) Paulo Duarte	11 August 2025	(Note: Guinea, fifa.com)
Guinea-Bissau	(Guinea-Bissau) Emiliano Té	1 August 2025	(Note: Guinea-Bissau, fifa.com)
Ivory Coast	(France) Hervé Renard	4 August 2026	(Note: Ivory Coast, fifa.com)
Kenya	(South Africa) Benni McCarthy	3 March 2025	(Note: Kenya, fifa.com)
Lesotho	(Lesotho) Bob Mafoso	9 February 2026	(Note: Lesotho, fifa.com)
Liberia	(Belgium) Mohammed Adil Erradi	19 May 2026	(Note: Liberia, fifa.com)
Libya	(Senegal) Youssoupha Dabo	15 July 2026	(Note: Libya, fifa.com)
Madagascar	(France) Corentin Martins	30 January 2025	(Note: Madagascar, fifa.com)
Malawi	(Zimbabwe) Kalisto Pasuwa	12 February 2025	(Note: Malawi, fifa.com)
Mali	(Portugal) Anthony da Silva	5 June 2026	(Note: Mali, fifa.com)
Mauritania	(Spain) Aritz López Garai	24 November 2024	(Note: Mauritania, fifa.com)
Mauritius	(Portugal) Rui Pedro & (Mauritius) Daniel Ramsamy	23 April 2026	(Note: Mauritius, fifa.com)
Morocco	(Morocco) Mohamed Ouahbi	5 March 2026	(Note: Morocco, fifa.com)
Mozambique	(Mozambique) Chiquinho Conde	27 October 2021	(Note: Mozambique, fifa.com)
Namibia	(Namibia) Collin Benjamin	15 June 2022	(Note: Namibia, fifa.com)
Niger	(Algeria) Nabil Neghiz	11 September 2026	(Note: Niger, fifa.com)
Nigeria	(Mali) Éric Chelle	7 January 2025	(Note: Nigeria, fifa.com)
Réunion (Note: Associate member of CAF, non-member of FIFA.)	(France) Christian Dafreville	19 November 2025	
Rwanda	(England) Stephen Constantine	12 March 2026	(Note: Rwanda, fifa.com)
São Tomé and Príncipe	(Portugal) Ricardo Monsanto	1 March 2024	(Note: São Tomé and Príncipe, fifa.com)
Senegal	(France) Patrick Vieira	18 August 2026	(Note: Senegal, fifa.com)
Seychelles	(Seychelles) Vivian Bothe	1 March 2026	(Note: Seychelles, fifa.com)
Sierra Leone	(France) Didier Gomes Da Rosa	5 June 2026	(Note: Sierra Leone, fifa.com)
Somalia	(Somalia) Yusuf Ali Nur	12 March 2025	(Note: Somali Football Federation, fifa.com)
South Africa	(South Africa) Pitso Mosimane	8 August 2026	(Note: South Africa, fifa.com)
South Sudan	(Democratic Republic of the Congo) Christian Nsengi-Biembe	11 August 2026	(Note: South Sudan, fifa.com)
Sudan	(Ghana) James Kwesi Appiah	20 September 2023	(Note: Sudan, fifa.com)
Tanzania	(Argentina) Miguel Ángel Gamondi	4 November 2025	
Togo	(France) Patrice Neveu	19 February 2026	(Note: Togo, fifa.com)
Tunisia	(Tunisia) Mouin Chaâbani	17 July 2026	(Note: Tunisia, fifa.com)
Uganda	(Belgium) Paul Put	2 November 2023	(Note: Uganda, fifa.com)
Zambia	(Zambia) George Lwandamina (caretaker)	6 March 2026	(Note: Zambia, fifa.com)
Zanzibar	Vacant		
Zimbabwe	(Spain) Ramón Catalá	20 August 2026	(Note: Zimbabwe, fifa.com)

== CONCACAF ==
The Confederation of North, Central America and Caribbean Association Football has 41 members, of which six are not affiliated with FIFA: Bonaire, French Guiana, Guadeloupe, Martinique, Saint Martin, and Sint Maarten.

Team	Manager	Assumed role	Refs
Anguilla	(England) Ewan Gunter	16 September 2026	(Note: Anguilla, fifa.com)
Antigua and Barbuda	(Mexico) Jacques Passy	4 April 2025	(Note: Antigua and Barbuda, fifa.com)
Aruba	(Aruba) Marvic Bermúdez	2 March 2022	(Note: Aruba, fifa.com)
Bahamas	(England) Gifton Noel-Williams	1 July 2026	(Note: Bahamas, fifa.com)
Barbados	(Barbados) Kent Hall (caretaker)	6 November 2023	(Note: Barbados, fifa.com)
Belize	(Peru) Martín Dall'Orso	28 August 2026	(Note: Belize, fifa.com)
Bermuda	(Bermuda) John Barry Nusum	7 August 2026	(Note: Bermuda, fifa.com)
Bonaire	(Bonaire) Rilove Janga	2023	
British Virgin Islands	(Spain) David Pérez	1 March 2025	(Note: British Virgin Islands, fifa.com)
Canada	(United States) Jesse Marsch	13 May 2024	
Cayman Islands	(Cayman Islands) Colin Rowe	27 May 2025	(Note: Cayman Islands, fifa.com)
Costa Rica	(Costa Rica) Bryan Ruiz	22 October 2026	(Note: Costa Rica, fifa.com)
Cuba	(Cuba) Pedro Pereira	3 November 2025	(Note: Cuba, fifa.com)
Curaçao	(Netherlands) Dick Advocaat	11 May 2026	(Note: Curaçao, fifa.com)
Dominica	(Scotland) Kurt Herd	19 January 2026	(Note: Dominica, fifa.com)
Dominican Republic	(Argentina) Marcelo Neveleff	23 January 2023	(Note: Dominican Republic, fifa.com)
El Salvador	(Colombia) Hernán Darío Gómez	24 February 2025	(Note: El Salvador, fifa.com)
French Guiana	(French Guiana) Stéphane D'Urbano	1 November 2024	
Grenada	(Trinidad and Tobago) Stern John	18 August 2026	(Note: Grenada, fifa.com)
Guadeloupe	(Guadeloupe) Moïse Castry	9 July 2026	
Guatemala	(Mexico) Luis Fernando Tena	9 December 2021	(Note: Guatemala, fifa.com)
Guyana	(Canada) Marco Bonofiglio	10 July 2026	(Note: Guyana, fifa.com)
Haiti	(Spain) David Badía	23 August 2026	(Note: Haiti, fifa.com)
Honduras	(Spain) José Francisco Molina	27 February 2026	(Note: Honduras, fifa.com)
Jamaica	(Jamaica) Rudolph Speid (caretaker)	20 November 2025	(Note: Jamaica, fifa.com)
Martinique	(France) Fabien Mercadal	27 September 2025	
Mexico	(Mexico) Rafael Márquez	8 July 2026	(Note: Mexico, fifa.com)
Montserrat	(Spain) Gabriel Calderón	30 July 2026	(Note: Montserrat, fifa.com)
Nicaragua	(Argentina) Juan Cruz Real	24 April 2026	(Note: Nicaragua, fifa.com)
Panama	(Spain) Thomas Christiansen	23 July 2020	(Note: Panama, fifa.com)
Puerto Rico	(Argentina) Víctor Nicolás Lonchuk (caretaker)	12 November 2026	(Note: Puerto Rico, fifa.com)
Saint Kitts and Nevis	(Brazil) Marcelo Serrano	6 February 2026	(Note: St Kitts and Nevis, fifa.com)
Saint Lucia	(Trinidad and Tobago) Rajesh Latchoo	21 September 2026	(Note: Saint Lucia, fifa.com)
Saint Martin	(French Guiana) Jean-Claude Darcheville	22 May 2025	
Saint Vincent and the Grenadines	(Canada) Michael Findlay	3 August 2026	(Note: St Vincent and the Grenadines, fifa.com)
Sint Maarten	(Netherlands) Piet de Jong	2021	
Suriname	(Netherlands) Henk Fraser	28 July 2026	(Note: Suriname, fifa.com)
Trinidad and Tobago	(Trinidad and Tobago) Derek King	4 May 2026	(Note: Trinidad and Tobago, fifa.com)
Turks and Caicos Islands	Vacant		(Note: Turks and Caicos Islands, fifa.com)
United States	Vacant	18 November 2026	(Note: United States, fifa.com)
U.S. Virgin Islands	(United States Virgin Islands) Terrence Jones	7 October 2019	(Note: US Virgin Islands, fifa.com)

== CONMEBOL ==
The South American Football Confederation has 10 members.

Team	Manager	Assumed role	Refs
Argentina	(Argentina) Lionel Scaloni	3 August 2018	(Note: Argentina, fifa.com)
Bolivia	(Bolivia) Óscar Villegas	20 July 2024	(Note: Bolivia, fifa.com)
Brazil	(Italy) Carlo Ancelotti	26 May 2025	(Note: Brazil, fifa.com)
Chile	(Chile) Nicolás Córdova (caretaker)	4 July 2025	(Note: Chilean Football Association, fifa.com)
Colombia	(Argentina) Néstor Lorenzo	2 June 2022	(Note: Colombia, fifa.com)
Ecuador	(Argentina) Marcelo Gallardo	13 September 2026	(Note: Ecuador, fifa.com)
Paraguay	(Argentina) Gustavo Alfaro	16 August 2024	(Note: Paraguay, fifa.com)
Peru	(Brazil) Mano Menezes	29 January 2026	(Note: Peru, fifa.com)
Uruguay	(Uruguay) Diego Forlán (caretaker)	12 July 2026	(Note: Uruguay, fifa.com)
Venezuela	(Venezuela) Oswaldo Vizcarrondo	20 January 2026	(Note: Venezuela, fifa.com)

== OFC ==
The Oceania Football Confederation has 11 full members, and two associate members not affiliated with FIFA: Kiribati and Tuvalu.

Team	Manager	Assumed role	Refs
American Samoa	(Spain) Diego Gómez	9 March 2026	(Note: American Samoa, fifa.com)
Cook Islands	(New Zealand) Rhys Ruka	13 August 2026	(Note: Cook Islands, fifa.com)
Fiji	(Guadeloupe) Stéphane Auvray	20 October 2025	(Note: Fiji, fifa.com)
Kiribati (Note: Associate member of the OFC, non-member of FIFA.)	(Kiribati) Pine Iosefa	2026	
New Caledonia	(French Polynesia) Félix Tagawa	6 August 2026	(Note: New Caledonia, fifa.com)
New Zealand	(England) Darren Bazeley	1 July 2023	(Note: New Zealand, fifa.com)
Papua New Guinea	Vacant	14 October 2026	(Note: Papua New Guinea, fifa.com)
Samoa	(New Zealand) Jess Ibrom	1 April 2024	(Note: Samoa, fifa.com)
Solomon Islands	(England) Ben Cahn (caretaker)	22 March 2026	(Note: Solomon Islands, fifa.com)
Tahiti	(France) Joël Fréchet	25 December 2025	(Note: Tahiti, fifa.com)
Tonga	(Tonga) Timote Moleni	November 2026	(Note: Tonga, fifa.com)
Tuvalu	(Netherlands) Robert Maaskant	26 October 2026	
Vanuatu	(Vanuatu) Richard Iwai	September 2026	(Note: Vanuatu, fifa.com)

== UEFA ==
The Union of European Football Associations has 55 members.

Team	Manager	Assumed role	Refs
Albania	(Italy) Rolando Maran	19 May 2026	(Note: Albania, fifa.com)
Andorra	(Andorra) Koldo Álvarez	2 February 2010	(Note: Andorra, fifa.com)
Armenia	(Armenia) Yegishe Melikyan	6 August 2025	(Note: Armenia, fifa.com)
Austria	(Germany) Ralf Rangnick	24 May 2022	(Note: Austria, fifa.com)
Azerbaijan	(Azerbaijan) Aykhan Abbasov	30 September 2025	(Note: Azerbaijan, fifa.com)
Belarus	(Belarus) Viktor Goncharenko	6 January 2026	(Note: Belarus Football Federation, fifa.com)
Belgium	(Netherlands) Mark van Bommel	24 July 2026	(Note: Belgium, fifa.com)
Bosnia and Herzegovina	(Bosnia and Herzegovina) Sergej Barbarez	19 April 2024	(Note: Bosnia and Herzegovina, fifa.com)
Bulgaria	(Bulgaria) Atanas Ribarski (caretaker)	29 September 2026	(Note: Bulgaria, fifa.com)
Croatia	(Croatia) Slaven Bilić	13 July 2026	(Note: Croatia, fifa.com)
Cyprus	(Greece) Akis Mantzios	9 January 2025	(Note: Cyprus, fifa.com)
Czech Republic	(Spain) Santi Denia	31 July 2026	(Note: Czech Republic, fifa.com)
Denmark	(Denmark) Brian Riemer	24 October 2024	
England	(Germany) Thomas Tuchel	1 January 2025	(Note: England, fifa.com)
Estonia	(Estonia) Jürgen Henn	15 May 2024	(Note: Estonia, fifa.com)
Faroe Islands	(Faroe Islands) Eyðun Klakstein	17 February 2025	(Note: Faroe Islands, fifa.com)
Finland	(Denmark) Jacob Friis	20 January 2025	(Note: Finland, fifa.com)
France	(France) Zinedine Zidane	28 July 2026	(Note: France, fifa.com)
Georgia	(Georgia (country)) Ramaz Svanadze	26 September 2026	(Note: Georgia, fifa.com)
Germany	(Germany) Jürgen Klopp	24 July 2026	(Note: Germany, fifa.com)
Gibraltar	(Gibraltar) Scott Wiseman	26 February 2025	(Note: Gibraltar, fifa.com)
Greece	(Serbia) Ivan Jovanović	11 June 2024	(Note: Greece, fifa.com)
Hungary	(Italy) Marco Rossi	19 June 2018	(Note: Hungary, fifa.com)
Iceland	(Iceland) Arnar Gunnlaugsson	16 January 2025	(Note: Iceland, fifa.com)
Israel	(Israel) Ran Ben Shimon	23 May 2024	(Note: Israel, fifa.com)
Italy	(Italy) Roberto Mancini	28 July 2026	(Note: Italy, fifa.com)
Kazakhstan	Vacant	17 November 2026	(Note: Kazakhstan, fifa.com)
Kosovo	(Germany) Franco Foda	17 February 2024	(Note: Kosovo, fifa.com)
Latvia	Vacant	20 November 2026	(Note: Latvia, fifa.com)
Liechtenstein	(Germany) Konrad Fünfstück	1 June 2023	(Note: Liechtenstein, fifa.com)
Lithuania	(Lithuania) Mindaugas Čepas	21 October 2026	(Note: Lithuania, fifa.com)
Luxembourg	(Luxembourg) Jeff Strasser	19 August 2025	(Note: Luxembourg, fifa.com)
Malta	(Italy) Emilio De Leo	13 January 2025	(Note: Malta, fifa.com)
Moldova	(Moldova) Lilian Popescu	16 September 2025	(Note: Moldova, fifa.com)
Montenegro	(Montenegro) Mirko Vučinić	19 September 2025	(Note: Montenegro, fifa.com)
Netherlands	(Spain) Xavi Hernández	12 August 2026	(Note: Netherlands, fifa.com)
North Macedonia	(North Macedonia) Goce Sedloski	22 December 2025	(Note: North Macedonia, fifa.com)
Northern Ireland	(Northern Ireland) Michael O'Neill	7 December 2022	(Note: Northern Ireland, fifa.com)
Norway	(Norway) Ståle Solbakken	7 December 2020	(Note: Norway, fifa.com)
Poland	(Poland) Jan Urban	16 July 2025	
Portugal	(Portugal) Jorge Jesus	10 July 2026	(Note: Portugal, fifa.com)
Republic of Ireland	(Iceland) Heimir Hallgrímsson	10 July 2024	(Note: Republic of Ireland, fifa.com)
Romania	(Romania) Gheorghe Hagi	20 April 2026	(Note: Romania, fifa.com)
Russia	(Russia) Valery Karpin	26 July 2021	(Note: Russian Football Union, fifa.com)
San Marino	(Italy) Roberto Cevoli	15 December 2023	(Note: San Marino, fifa.com)
Scotland	(Belgium) Sébastien Pocognoli	16 August 2026	(Note: Scotland, fifa.com)
Serbia	(Serbia) Veljko Paunović	30 October 2025	(Note: Serbia, fifa.com)
Slovakia	(Slovakia) Vladimír Weiss	12 May 2026	(Note: Slovakia, fifa.com)
Slovenia	(Slovenia) Boštjan Cesar	21 January 2026	(Note: Slovenia, fifa.com)
Spain	(Spain) Luis de la Fuente	8 December 2022	(Note: Spain, fifa.com)
Sweden	(England) Graham Potter	20 October 2025	(Note: Sweden, fifa.com)
Switzerland	(Switzerland) Murat Yakin	9 August 2021	(Note: Switzerland, fifa.com)
Turkey	(Turkey) Sergen Yalçın	20 October 2026	(Note: Türkiye, fifa.com)
Ukraine	(Italy) Andrea Maldera	18 May 2026	(Note: Ukraine, fifa.com)
Wales	(Wales) Craig Bellamy	9 July 2024	(Note: Wales, fifa.com)
