= Thapelo =

Thapelo is a unisex given name (meaning "prayer") of southern African origin that may refer to:

- Thapelo Ketlogetswe (born 1991), Botswana sprinter
- Thapelo Kotlhai (born 1989), South African music artist, tv and radio producer
- Thapelo Matsheka
- Thapelo Mogale, South African politician
- Thapelo Mokhele (born 1986), footballer from Lesotho
- Thapelo Mokoena (born 1982), South African actor and television presenter
- Thapelo Morena (born 1993), South African Footballer
- Thapelo Phora (born 1991), South African sprinter
- Thapelo Tale (born 1988), footballer from Lesotho
- Thapelo Tshilo (born 1985), South African footballer
