= Joel Luphahla =

Zimbabwean footballer (born 1977)

Joel Luphahla (born 26 April 1977) is a Zimbabwean football midfielder.

Luphahla was born in Tsholotsho Matebeleland province

== Career ==
Luphahla is a Zimbabwean midfielder who has spent most of his career playing in South Africa's Premier Soccer League and also had a spell in Cyprus. He suffered a serious leg injury while playing for Platinum Stars, but returned to the club after an extended absence.

Luphahla has been capped for the Zimbabwean national team. He played for the team that won the 2000 COSAFA Cup, and was in the Zimbabwean squad for the 2006 African Cup of Nations. He plays attacking midfielder.

=== International goals ===
Scores and results list Zimbabwe's goal tally first.

No	Date	Venue	Opponent	Score	Result	Competition
1.	5 March 2000	National Sports Stadium, Harare, Zimbabwe	Lesotho	1–1	2–1	2000 COSAFA Cup
2.	3 February 2004	Stade Olympique de Sousse, Sousse, Tunisia	Algeria	2–1	2–1	2004 Africa Cup of Nations

== Clubs ==
- 1998–2000: (Zimbabwe) Highlanders FC
- 2000–2004: (Cyprus) AEP Paphos FC
- 2004–2005: (South Africa) Silver Stars
- 2005–2006: (South Africa) Supersport United
- 2006–2010: (South Africa) Platinum Stars
- 2010–2015: (Zimbabwe) Highlanders FC
- 2015-2016: (Zimbabwe) Tsholotsho FC

Presently is an assistant coach at a Zimbabwean football team named Dynamos fc
