= Tseko Monaheng =

Mosotho actor

- Born: Tseko Monaheng; Khubetsoana, Lesotho
- Occupation: Actor
- Years active: 2005–present

Tseko Monaheng, is a Mosotho actor. He is best known for the roles in the films This Is Not a Burial, It's a Resurrection, Five Fingers for Marseilles and short film Behemoth: Or the Game of God.

== Career ==
In 2005, Monaheng was discovered by veteran actor and producer, Silas Monyatsi during the auditions for AIDS drama Ke Khetho Eaka. Later in the same year, he acted in the short film Untitled directed by Kaizer Matsumunyane. In the meantime, he acted in several AIDS radio dramas. In 2006 he debut in the South African drama along with Soul City's Untitled Stories including Mapule's Choice and Monna Motsamai.

He also acted in several Basotho films including Lemohang Jeremiah Mosese's critically acclaimed short film Behemoth: Or the Game of God as the lead role 'Preacher'. With the success of the short, he was then selected for Mosese's next venture This Is Not a Burial, It's a Resurrection in 2019. The film was screened at several international film festivals as well. He also acted in the local films: Kau la poho (2008) and Lilaphalapha.

In 2017, Monaheng acted in the South African film Five Fingers for Marseilles. He played the role as a corrupt police officer. The film received positive reviews and selected for screening at the Toronto International Film Festival (TIFF) from 7 to 17 September 2017. In 2018, he debut in the South African television with the soap opera Rhythm City. However, he was auditioned for the role in October 2017. Monaheng also joined with the productions: Mantsopa and Qomatsi as well as various Lesedi FM radio dramas.

== Filmography ==
Year	Film	Role	Genre	Ref.
2005	Untitled		Short film	
2008	Mapule's Choice		Short film	
2008	Kau la poho	Chief Mohale	Short film	
2009	Lilaphalapha		Film	
2013	Mantsopa		TV series	
2015	Qomatsi		TV series	
2014	Naka la Moitheri	Chief Mohale	Short film	
2016	Behemoth: Or the Game of God	Preacher	Short film	
2017	Five Fingers for Marseilles		Film	
2018	Rhythm City		TV series	
2019	This Is Not a Burial, It's a Resurrection		Film	
