= Makama =

Makama may refer to:

- Makama, alternative spelling of Maqama

== People ==
- Aliyu Makama (1905–1980), Nigerian politician
- Ibrahim Makama Misau, Nigerian politician
- Jovon Makama (born 2001), English footballer
- Mamman Makama (born 1946), Nigerian sprinter
- Neo Makama (born 1981), Lesothan footballer
- Rimini Makama, Nigerian lawyer and business executive
- Thuli Brilliance Makama, Swazi environmental attorney

== See also ==
- Gidan Makama Museum Kano, Nigeria
