= Mosonngoa =

2014 Mosotho short film

- Film poster
- Directed by: Lemohang Jeremiah Mosese
- Written by: Lemohang Jeremiah Mosese; Hannah Stockmann
- Produced by: Hannah Stockmann
- Starring: Siphiwe Nzima-Ntskhe; Masele Tokane; Chaka Phehlamarole Khalechene; Retselisitsoe Sekake
- Cinematography: Lemohang Jeremiah Mosese
- Edited by: Hannah Stockmann
- Music by: Piers Caldwell
- Production company: Mokoari Street Productions
- Release date: May 2014 (Cannes)
- Running time: 28 minutes
- Countries: Lesotho; Germany
- Language: Sotho

Mosonngoa is a 2014 Mosotho action–drama short film directed by Lemohang Jeremiah Mosese and produced by Hannah Stockmann. The film stars Siphiwe Nzima-Ntskhe in the titular lead role whereas Masele Tokane, Chaka Phehlamarole Khalechene and Retselisitsoe Sekake made supportive roles.

The film received critical reviews from critics and screened at several international film festivals.

== Cast ==
- Siphiwe Nzima-Ntskhe as Mosonngoa
- Masele Tokane as Young Mosonngoa
- Chaka Phehlamarole Khalechene as Rapule
- Retselisitsoe Sekake as Phefo
- Matoae Toae

== International screenings ==
- Cannes Film Festival, France for Short Film Corner – May 2014
- Durban International Film Festival, South Africa – 25 July 2014
- Richmond International Film Festival, USA – 26 February 2015
- Carthage Film Festival, Tunisia – 25 November 2015
