= Taeli Ramashalane =

Mosotho footballer

Personal information
- Full name: Taeli Ramashalane
- Place of birth: Lesotho
- Position: Right winger

Team information
- Current team: LCS
- Number: 14

Senior career*
Years	Team	Apps	(Gls)
2000–2001	Nyenye Rovers		
2002–2003	LPS Maseru		
2002–2003	Lioli FC		
2006–	LCS		

International career^{‡}
2007–	Lesotho	3	(0)
- * Club domestic league appearances and goals ‡ National team caps and goals as of 10:15, 22 December 2009 (UTC)

Taeli Ramashalane is a Mosotho footballer who currently plays for Lesotho Correctional Services.

== Career ==
The midfielder played previously for Lesotho Prison Service, Nyenye Rovers and Lioli FC.

=== International ===
Since 2007, he has won three caps for the Lesotho national football team.
