= Behemoth: Or the Game of God =

2016 Mosotho short film

- Directed by: Lemohang Jeremiah Mosese
- Written by: Lemohang Jeremiah Mosese
- Produced by: Lemohang Jeremiah Mosese; Hannah Stockmann
- Starring: Tseko Monaheng
- Cinematography: Lemohang Jeremiah Mosese
- Edited by: Lemohang Jeremiah Mosese
- Production company: Mokoari Street Productions
- Release date: 6 February 2016 (France)
- Running time: 13 min.
- Countries: Lesotho; Germany
- Language: Sotho

Behemoth: Or the Game of God is a 2016 Mosotho action–mystery short film directed by Lemohang Jeremiah Mosese and co-produced by Hannah Stockmann. The film stars Tseko Monaheng as 'Preacher' in the lead role.

The film received critical reviews from critics and screened at several international film festivals.

== Cast ==
- Tseko Monaheng as Preacher

== International screenings ==
- Clermont-Ferrand International Short Film Festival, France – 6 February 2016
- African Film Festival AfryKamera, Poland – 23 April 2016
- Tenerife Shorts, Spain – 10 September 2016
- L'Étrange Festival, France – 10 September 2016
