= Mugeyi =

Mugeyi is a Zimbabwean surname. Notable people with the surname include:

- Wilfred Mugeyi, a Zimbabwean footballer
- William Mugeyi, a Zimbabwean footballer
