= Maleh (artist) =

Lesotho singer and songwriter (born 1984)

- Born: 'Malehloka Mary Hlalele; 1986 (age 39–40); Maseru, Lesotho
- Genres: Afro-fusion; afro-soul; jazz
- Occupations: Singer; songwriter; composer
- Instrument: Vocals
- Years active: 2003–present
- Label: Psalms Productions

'Malehloka Mary "Maleh" Hlalele (born 1986) is a Lesotho-born, Mosotho–South African singer, songwriter and composer known for her soulful Afro-soul and Afro-fusion sound. Her music is a blend of Basotho traditional folk, Afro-beat, jazz and Western popular music styles of the '80s and '90s.

Her music career started in 2003 when she was in high school as part of the Afro pop band Khaya.

== Early life and career ==
Maleh was born and raised in Maseru, Lesotho, the daughter of a father who played in a band called Blue Diamonds and fostered her early love of music. She began singing publicly as a child, often busking at Maseru Sun Hotel. Inspired by artists like Thandiswa Mazwai, she started writing songs at a young age and performed traditional Sotho songs during community gatherings.

=== Khaya and breakthrough (2003–2005) ===
Maleh joined the Afro-pop band Kaya in 2003, when she was in high school. The band released their debut album, Kunzima, in 2005. It won that year's Metro FM Award.

=== Solo debut and success (2010–2015) ===
After leaving Khaya and studying cinematography, she launched her solo career. In 2011, she released her debut album Step Child, followed by the single "Falling" with DJ Kent and which was a hit in 2012. The Step Child won the South African Music Award (SAMA) for Best African Adult Album in 2013. In 2014, she released her follow-up album You Make My Heart Go, which also won a SAMA in 2015 for Best African Adult Album.

=== Later work and independence (2016–present) ===
Maleh took a brief break in music and later returned independently under her label, Psalms Productions, which released Lerato Laka in 2022, featuring songs like "Ke Tlo Fihla" and "Makoti" who also became hits in South Africa.

== Awards ==
Her album, Step Child, was nominated for the 2013 Metro FM Music Awards for ‘Best African Pop’ and ‘Best Contemporary Jazz’ categories and the 2013 SAMA Award for the 'Best African Adult Album', 'Album of The Year' and 'Best Female Artist of The Year'. She won the SAMA Award for 'Best African Adult Album'.

In 2015, her album You Make My Heart Go won the SAMA Award for Best African Adult Album.

== Discography ==
=== Albums ===
- Step Child (2011)
- You Make My Heart Go (2014)
- Lerato Laka (2022)

=== Selected singles ===
- "Falling" (feat. DJ Kent, 2012)
- "You Make My Heart Go" (2014)
- "Ke Tlo Fihla" (2022)
- "Mmoloki" (2023)

== See also ==
- Leomile Motsetsela
