= Tatolo Mphuthing =

Mosotho footballer (born 1979)

Personal information
- Full name: Tatolo Mphuthing
- Date of birth: 16 May 1979 (age 47)
- Place of birth: Lesotho
- Position: Midfielder

Team information
- Current team: Roma Rovers

Senior career*
Years	Team	Apps	(Gls)
2007–	Roma Rovers		

International career^{‡}
2002–	Lesotho	8	(0)
- * Club domestic league appearances and goals ‡ National team caps and goals as of 11:55, 23 December 2009 (UTC)

Tatolo Mphuthing (born 16 May 1979) is a Mosotho footballer who currently plays as a midfielder for Roma Rovers. He has won eight caps for the Lesotho national football team since 2002.
