= Liteboho Molise =

Lesotho actress (born 1988)

Liteboho Molise (born 23 January 1988) is an actress from Lesotho.

She is known for her role in the SABC 2 Venda soapie, Muvhango, where she has played Teboho since May 2012.

== Early life and education ==
Molise was born and raised in Lesotho in the district of Butha-Buthe. There, she was educated at Sophia Primary school and later attended Mohale's Hoek High School, located in Mohale's Hoek, where she matriculated. Her parents stayed in Maseru whilst she was raised by her aunt.

== Career ==
=== Filmography ===
Year	Title	Role	Notes
2012–2020, 2024-205	Muvhango	Teboho Mukhwevo	television series
2014, 2016	Skwizas	Mantwa	television sitcom series
2017	#Karektas	herself	comedy show
2010–2023	Lingashoni	Seipati Moeketsi	television series

== See also ==
- List of people from Lesotho
- Lists of actresses
