= Tšepo Toloane =

Lesotho footballer

Personal information
- Full name: Tšepo Toloane
- Date of birth: 15 July 1997 (age 29)
- Place of birth: Lesotho
- Position: Midfielder

Team information
- Current team: Lesotho Defence Force
- Number: 4

Senior career*
Years	Team	Apps	(Gls)
2017–	Lesotho Defence Force		

International career^{‡}
2018–	Lesotho	67	(0)
- * Club domestic league appearances and goals as of 8 June 2026 ‡ National team caps and goals as of 8 June 2026

Tšepo Toloane (born 15 July 1997 in Lesotho) is a Mosotho footballer who plays as a midfielder for LDF FC in the Lesotho Premier League.

== Club career ==
Toloane has spent his senior career at LDF FC, the football club of the Lesotho Defence Force, where he has been a regular presence since joining in July 2017.

== International career ==
Toloane made his senior debut for the Lesotho national team in 2018 and has accumulated more than 58 FIFA caps, making him one of the most capped players in the country's history.He was part of the Lesotho squad at the 2024 COSAFA Cup.< He was named in the squad for the 2026 World Cup qualifying fixture against South Africa in September 2025, and was included in the squad for the subsequent qualifier against Nigeria in October 2025. He started in Lesotho's World Cup qualifying fixture against Rwanda in March 2025.
