= Mother, I Am Suffocating. This Is My Last Film About You =

2019 Lesotho film

- Directed by: Lemohang Jeremiah Mosese
- Screenplay by: Lemohang Jeremiah Mosese
- Produced by: Lemohang Jeremiah Mosese
- Starring: Napo Kalebe; Moliteli Mokake
- Cinematography: Lemohang Jeremiah Mosese
- Music by: Guy James Cohen
- Release date: 9 February 2019
- Running time: 76 minutes
- Countries: Lesotho; Qatar; Germany
- Languages: English; Sesotho

Mother, I Am Suffocating. This Is My Last Film About You is a 2019 Lesotho bilingual documentary film produced, written and directed by Lemohang Jeremiah Mosese. The film depicts the scenario of personal experiences of the director after his departure from Lesotho who now resides in Germany. The film was released on 9 February 2019 and received critical acclaim for its screenplay and cinematography. The film also received several nominations at international film festivals and was rated as one of the best African films of 2019.

== Cast ==
- Napo Kalebe
- Moliteli Mokake
- Thato Khobothe
- Tsohle Mojati
- Mercy Koetle
- Pheku Lisema

== Synopsis ==
On the dusty streets of Lesotho, people stare at a young lady who carries a wooden cross on her back. She looks back at their faces. Taking the form of an extended poetic letter to the protagonist's mother and motherland, the film shifts its focus and perspective between Lesotho, a tiny nation in Southern Africa, and Germany where the director lives.

== Reception ==
On Rotten Tomatoes, the film holds an approval rating of 100% based on 5 reviews, with an average rating of 7/10.

== Awards and nominations ==
Year	Award	Category	Result
2019	15th Africa Movie Academy Awards	Best Cinematography	Nominated
2019	15th Africa Movie Academy Awards	Best Documentary	Nominated
2019	Bergen International Film Festival	Documentaire extraordinaire	Nominated
2019	Berlin International Film Festival	Best Documentary	Nominated
2019	Doc Aviv Film Festival	Depth of Field Competition	Nominated
2019	Durban International Film Festival	Best Documentary	Nominated
2019	Sheffield International Documentary Festival	Art Documentary	Nominated
2019	Pacific Meridian	Best Documentary	Nominated
2019	Las Palmas de Gran Canaria International Film Festival	Special Jury Award	Won
