= Mokheti Matsora =

Mosotho footballer

Personal information
- Full name: Mokheti Matsora
- Place of birth: Lesotho
- Position: Striker

Team information
- Current team: LMPS Maseru

Senior career*
Years	Team	Apps	(Gls)
2009–	LMPS Maseru		

International career^{‡}
2009–	Lesotho	2	(0)
- * Club domestic league appearances and goals ‡ National team caps and goals as of 10:22, 22 December 2009 (UTC)

Mokheti Matsora is a Mosotho footballer who currently plays as a striker for LMPS Maseru. Since 2009, he has won two caps for the Lesotho national football team.
