= William Mugeyi =

Zimbabwean footballer (born 1969)

Personal information
- Date of birth: 4 July 1969 (age 57)
- Place of birth: Salisbury, Southern Rhodesia
- Height: 1.74 m (5 ft 8 1/2 in)
- Position: Defender

Team information
- Current team: AmaZulu F.C. (ass't)

Senior career*
Years	Team	Apps	(Gls)
1992–1993	Circle United	22	(1)
1993	Black Aces Harare	30	(2)
1993–2005	Umtata Bush Bucks	376	(28)
Total		428	(31)

International career
1993–2001	Zimbabwe	12	(2)
- * Club domestic league appearances and goals as of 12 July 2010

William Mugeyi (born 4 July 1969) is a Zimbabwean footballer who last played for Bush Bucks in South Africa. He is the twin brother of Zimbabwean footballer Wilfred Mugeyi.

== Career ==
Born in Salisbury (now Harare), Mugeyi had a 13-year club football career, spending most of it playing as a left back alongside his twin brother in the South African Premier Division with Umtata Bush Bucks. He won the Zimbabwean league with Black Aces in 1992 before moving to South Africa with Bush Bucks in 1993.

Mugeyi made several appearances for the Zimbabwe national football team, including twelve FIFA World Cup qualifying matches. He helped Zimbabwe win the 2000 COSAFA Cup, scoring twice in the final against Lesotho.
