= Sekhoane Moerane =

Lesotho footballer (born 1997)

Personal information
- Full name: Sekhoane Benedict Moerane
- Date of birth: 18 September 1997 (age 29)
- Place of birth: Mazenod, Maseru, Lesotho
- Height: 1.73 m (5 ft 8 in)
- Position: Goalkeeper

Team information
- Current team: Orbit College
- Number: 41

Senior career*
| Years | Team | Apps | (Gls) |
| 2018–2023 | LMPS | | |
| 2024– | Orbit College | 8 | (0) |

International career^{‡}
| 2019– | Lesotho | 42 | (1) |
- * Club domestic league appearances and goals as of 11 September 2024 ‡ National team caps and goals as of 11 September 2024

Sekhoane Benedict Moerane (born 18 September 1997) is a Lesotho footballer who plays as a goalkeeper for Orbit College and Lesotho National Football Team.

== Calub career ==
Moerane was born on 18 September 1997 in Mazenod, Kingdom of Lesotho. He started his career with Lesotho side LMPS. During the 2022/23 season, he conceded zero goals in eight of his first nine appearances while playing for the club. In 2024, he signed for South African side Orbit College. On 2 February 2024, he debuted for the club during a 2–1 win over Venda. He made eight league appearances for them during the 2023/24 season.

== International career ==
Moerane is a Lesotho international. He played for the Lesotho national football team at the 2021 COSAFA Cup, 2022 COSAFA Cup, 2023 COSAFA Cup, and 2024 COSAFA Cup. He helped the Lesotho national football team achieve second place at the 2023 COSAFA Cup. He was awarded 2023 COSAFA Cup Best Goalkeeper.
