= Ancestral Visions of the Future =

2025 documentary film by Lemohang Jeremiah Mosese

- Poster
- Directed by: Lemohang Jeremiah Mosese
- Written by: Lemohang Jeremiah Mosese
- Produced by: Marie Balducchi; Lemohang Jeremiah Mosese
- Cinematography: Lemohang Jeremiah Mosese; Phillip Leteka
- Edited by: Andrés Hilarión Madariaga
- Music by: Diego Noguera
- Production companies: Agat Films; Mokoari Street; Seera Films
- Release date: 20 February 2025 (Berlin)
- Running time: 90 minutes
- Countries: France; Lesotho; Germany; Qatar; Saudi Arabia
- Language: English

Ancestral Visions of the Future is a 2025 docufiction film written and directed by Lemohang Jeremiah Mosese. The film is a co-production of France, Lesotho, Germany, Qatar, and Saudi Arabia.

The film had its world premiere at the 75th Berlin International Film Festival during the Berlinale Special section on 20 February 2025.

== Premise ==
The film follows the director's childhood in Lesotho and his adult experience of exile in Berlin through the narratives of a young boy, a market woman, and a puppeteer.

== Production ==
The film is based on Moesse's exhibition of the same name, which he performed at the Berliner Festspiele during the Performing Exiles festival in June 2023.

In July 2024, the project received a €30,000 production grant from Berlinale's World Cinema Fund. It was selected to participate in the Final Cut program during the 2024 Venice Production Bridge, which supports films in post-production from African and Middle Eastern countries. It won three awards and received a total of €22,500 in grants. In August 2024, it was reported that production had wrapped.

== Release ==
Ancestral Visions of the Future had its world premiere at the 75th Berlin International Film Festival during the Berlinale Special section on 20 February 2025. Prior to the premiere, Memento International boarded the film's international sales.
