= Nyakhane Nyakhane =

Lesotho footballer

Personal information
- Full name: Nyakhane Nyakhane
- Place of birth: Lesotho
- Position: Midfielder

Team information
- Current team: Likhopo Maseru

Senior career*
Years	Team	Apps	(Gls)
2008–	Likhopo Maseru		

International career^{‡}
2009–	Lesotho	3	(0)
- * Club domestic league appearances and goals ‡ National team caps and goals as of 09:04, 22 December 2009 (UTC)

Nyakhane Nyakhane is a Mosotho footballer who currently plays as a midfielder for Likhopo Maseru. He has won three caps for the Lesotho national football team.
