= Thabo Makhele =

South African soccer player

Personal information
- Date of birth: 17 December 1994 (age 31)
- Place of birth: Hobhouse, South Africa
- Height: 1.88 m (6 ft 2 in)
- Position: Defender

Team information
- Current team: Chippa United
- Number: 4

Senior career*
Years	Team	Apps	(Gls)
2013–2015	Maluti FET College	25	(1)
2015–2016	Witbank Spurs	19	(1)
2016–2018	SuperSport United	0	(0)
2017	→ Stellenbosch (loan)	0	(0)
2017–2018	→ Witbank Spurs (loan)	21	(4)
2018–2019	TS Galaxy	19	(0)
2019–2020	Jomo Cosmos	19	(0)
2020–2023	All Stars	55	(2)
2023–	Chippa United	43	(0)

International career^{‡}
2015–2016	South Africa U23		
2024–	Lesotho	16	(1)
- * Club domestic league appearances and goals as of 16 March 2025 ‡ National team caps and goals as of 4 June 2026

Thabo Makhele (born 17 December 1994) is a soccer player who plays as a defender for Chippa United in the South African Premiership. Born in South Africa, he represented that country as a youth player before choosing to play for Lesotho.

He was born in Hobhouse, South Africa. In 2015, he was selected for South Africa U23 in preparation for 2016 Olympic Games. In March 2016, still playing for South Africa U23, he sustained an injury against Brazil U23, described as "horrible". His left foot being stuck in the pitch, his lower leg was twisted so severely that he was driven by ambulance to a hospital. It turned out to be a fracture of the fibula.

In the summer of 2016, Makhele therefore missed the Olympics, but was looking to get his break in the highest South African league as he was signed by SuperSport United from the Witbank Spurs. However, he never saw playing time and was loaned out to Stellenbosch in January 2017. He was then loaned back to the Witbank Spurs in 2017–18. In 2018, he was possibly joining the Free State Stars, but instead continued on the second tier.

In January 2023, on the last day of the winter transfer window, he was signed by Premiership outfit Chippa United from All Stars. After ten years of playing in the National First Division, he finally made his first-tier debut.

== International goals ==
Scores and results list Lesotho goal tally first, score column indicates score after each Makhele goal

List of international goals scored by Thabo Makhele
No.	Date	Venue	Opponent	Score	Result	Competition
1	4 June 2026	Lucas Moripe Stadium, Pretoria, South Africa	Kenya	1–1	1–1	Friendly
