= Molefe Lekoekoe =

Mosotho footballer

Personal information
- Full name: Molefe Lekoekoe
- Place of birth: Lesotho
- Position: Midfielder

Team information
- Current team: Lioli FC
- Number: 8

Senior career*
| Years | Team | Apps | (Gls) |
| 2008–2011 | Lesotho Defence Force FC | | |
| 2011– | Lioli FC | | |

International career^{‡}
| 2009– | Lesotho | 3 | (0) |
- * Club domestic league appearances and goals ‡ National team caps and goals as of 08:51, 22 December 2009 (UTC)

Molefe Lekoekoe is a Mosotho footballer.

== Career ==
The midfielder joined in summer 2011 from Lesotho Defence Force FC to League rival Lioli Teyateyaneng.

=== International ===
As of 22 December 2009, he has won three caps for the Lesotho national football team.
