= Mohapi Ntobo =

Mosotho footballer (born 1984)

Personal information
- Full name: Mohapi Ntobo
- Date of birth: 7 May 1984 (age 42)
- Place of birth: Lesotho
- Position: Defender

Team information
- Current team: Matlama Maseru

Senior career*
Years	Team	Apps	(Gls)
2004–	Matlama Maseru		

International career^{‡}
2003–	Lesotho	10	(0)
- * Club domestic league appearances and goals ‡ National team caps and goals as of 11:36, 23 December 2009 (UTC)

Mohapi Ntobo (born 7 May 1984) is a Mosotho footballer who plays as a defender for Matlama Maseru. He has won 10 caps for the Lesotho national football team since 2003.
