= Lekunutu Tseounyane =

Mosotho footballer (born 1983)

Personal information
- Full name: Lekunutu Tseounyane
- Date of birth: 1 May 1983 (age 43)
- Place of birth: Lesotho
- Position: Goalkeeper

Team information
- Current team: LMPS Maseru

Senior career*
Years	Team	Apps	(Gls)
2007–	LMPS Maseru		

International career^{‡}
2008–	Lesotho	4	(0)
- * Club domestic league appearances and goals ‡ National team caps and goals as of 08:18, 22 December 2009 (UTC)

Lekunutu Tseounyane (born 1 May 1983) is a Mosotho former footballer who played as a goalkeeper for LMPS Maseru. He won four caps for the Lesotho national football team since 2008.
