= Lengana Nkhethoa =

Mosotho footballer (born 1978)

Personal information
- Full name: Lengana Nkhethoa
- Date of birth: 17 August 1978 (age 48)
- Place of birth: Lesotho
- Position: Defender

Team information
- Current team: Matlama Maseru

Senior career*
Years	Team	Apps	(Gls)
2004–	Lesotho Defense Force		

International career^{‡}
2005–	Lesotho	7	(0)
- * Club domestic league appearances and goals ‡ National team caps and goals as of 11:52, 23 December 2009 (UTC)

Lengana Nkhethoa (born 17 August 1978) is a Mosotho footballer who currently plays as a defender for Lesotho Defense Force. He has won seven caps for the Lesotho national football team since 2005.
