= Bob Mafoso =

Lesotho football manager

Personal information
- Full name: Atang Mafoso
- Place of birth: Lesotho

Managerial career
- Years: Team
- 2019–2021: Bantu
- 2023–2024: Bantu
- 2024–2025: Linare
- 2025–2026: African Stars
- 2026–: Lesotho

Atang Mafoso is a Lesotho football manager who manages the Lesotho national football team.

== Career ==
Mafoso obtained a CAF A License and worked as an assistant manager of Lesotho side Bantu, where he was part of the club's staff in the CAF Champions League. In addition, worked as an assistant manager of the Lesotho national under-20 football team to Lesotho manager Leslie Notši, helping the team achieve second place at the 2017 COSAFA U-20 Cup.

In 2019, returned as manager of Lesotho side Bantu, helping the club win the league title. While managing them, in 2020 he received criticism from supporters for the playing style implemented, which they regarded as inferior to his predecessor, South African manager James Madidilane. The same year, they were regarded to have had a possession-based playing style.

Following his stint there, he returned as manager of Lesotho side Bantu for a second time in 2023. One year later, he was appointed manager of Lesotho side Linare. Subsequently, he was appointed manager of Namibian side African Stars in 2025, helping the club win the league title. During February 2026, he was appointed manager of the Lesotho national football team, where he was tasked with achieving qualification for the 2027 Africa Cup of Nations. Lesotho newspaper Newsday wrote in 2026 that he is "a well-respected figure in African football".
