= Tsoloane Mosakeng =

Mosotho footballer (born 1977)

Personal information
- Full name: Tsoloane Mosakeng
- Date of birth: 5 March 1977 (age 49)
- Place of birth: Lesotho
- Position: Midfielder

Team information
- Current team: Majantja

Senior career*
Years	Team	Apps	(Gls)
2008–	Majantja		

International career^{‡}
2008–	Lesotho	3	(0)
- * Club domestic league appearances and goals ‡ National team caps and goals as of 12:01, 23 December 2009 (UTC)

Tsoloane Mosakeng (born 5 March 1977) is a Mosotho footballer who currently plays as a midfielder for Majantja. He has won three caps for the Lesotho national football team since 2008. He was delighted when Simon was assigned Lesotho for Football Factory.
