= This Is Not a Burial, It's a Resurrection =

2019 Mosotho drama film

- Film poster
- Directed by: Lemohang Jeremiah Mosese
- Written by: Lemohang Jeremiah Mosese
- Produced by: Cait Pansegrouw; Elias Ribeiro
- Starring: Mary Twala Mhlongo; Jerry Mofokeng Wa; Makhaola Ndebele; Tseko Monaheng; Siphiwe Nzima-Ntskhe
- Cinematography: Pierre de Villiers
- Edited by: Lemohang Jeremiah Mosese
- Music by: Yu Miyashita
- Distributed by: Memento Films International; Trigon film
- Release dates: 29 August 2019 (Venice); 17 June 2020 (France); 27 November 2020 (South Africa)
- Running time: 120 minutes
- Countries: Lesotho; South Africa; Italy
- Language: Sesotho

This Is Not a Burial, It's a Resurrection is a 2019 drama film written and directed by Lemohang Jeremiah Mosese and co-produced by Cait Pansegrouw and Elias Ribeiro. The film stars Mary Twala Mhlongo, with Jerry Mofokeng Wa, Makhaola Ndebele, Tseko Monaheng and Siphiwe Nzima-Ntskhe in supporting roles.

It was selected as the Lesotho entry for the Academy Award for Best International Feature Film at the 93rd Academy Awards, but it was not nominated. It was the first time Lesotho had made a submission in the category. The film received positive reviews from critics and was screened at several international film festivals.

== Synopsis ==
Mantoa, an 80-year old widow, is preparing for the end by arranging her own funeral and bidding farewell to worldly affairs. However, her homeland is being converted into a dam and the residents must be resettled.

== Cast ==
- Mary Twala Mhlongo as Mantoa
- Jerry Mofokeng Wa as Lesiba Player
- Makhaola Ndebele as Priest
- Tseko Monaheng as Chief Khotso
- Siphiwe Nzima-Ntskhe as Pono
- Thabiso Makoto as Lasaro
- Thab Letsie as Mokolobetsi
- Silas Monyatse as Morui
- Aleandro Florio as Evangelist
- Sarah Weber as Evangelist's Wife

== Reception ==
On review aggregator website Rotten Tomatoes, the film has an approval rating of 100% based on 34 reviews, with an average rating of 8/10. The site's critical consensus reads, "This Is Not a Burial, It's a Resurrection stands in the fault line between the cradle of tradition and tomorrow, defiantly insisting that one need not exist at the expense of the other." Guy Lodge of Variety wrote that the film is "a haunted, unsentimental paean to land and its physical containment of community and ancestry — all endangered by nominally progressive infrastructure".

=== Accolades ===
At the 2020 Africa Movie Academy Awards, the film was nominated for seven awards, ultimately winning Best Costume Design, Best Cinematography, Best Actress in a Leading Role, and Best Director.

At the 2020 International Film Festival of Kerala, it won the Golden Crow-pheasant for Best Film.

== See also ==
- List of submissions to the 93rd Academy Awards for Best International Feature Film
- List of Lesotho submissions for the Academy Award for Best International Feature Film
