= Motlalentoa Letsosa =

Mosotho politician (born 1974)

Minister of Home Affairs Lesotho
- In office May 2020 – October 2022
- Prime Minister: Moeketsi Majoro

Minister of Education and Training Lesotho
- In office November 2016 – June 2017
- Prime Minister: Pakalitha Mosisili

Personal details
- Born: December 18, 1974 (age 51) Litšoeneng, Mafeteng District, Lesotho
- Education: National University of Lesotho
- Alma mater: University of Free State
- Occupation: Politician

Motlalentoa Letsosa (born 18 December 1974) is a former minister of home affairs of Lesotho. He was appointed in May 2020. He was previously the minister of education and training from November 2016 to June 2017.

== Background and education ==
Letsosa was born on the 18 December 1974 in Litsoeneng, Mafeteng in Lesotho. He got his First School Leaving Certificate in Litsoeneng Primary School and his Secondary School Certificate in Tsakholo High School. Letsosa earned a Bachelor’s Degree from the National University of Lesotho and his Master’s Degree in Higher Education Studies from the University of Free State. Thereafter, Letsosa got a certificate in Proof Reading and Copy-editing in South African Writers College in 2015.

== Career ==
Letsosa started his career as a Tutor in Tsakholo High School in 2000 and later became the Head of English Language Department in 2003 and a Vice Principal in 2010. Thereafter, he joined politics and he is the deputy leader of the Democratic Congress.
