= Matli Mohapeloa =

- Born: Matli Mohapeloa; 2 April 1984 (age 42); Whittlesea, Eastern Cape
- Occupation: Actor

Matli Mohapeloa (born 2 April 1984) is a South African actor.He is best known for portraying "Dj Ngwazi" in the etv soapie Rhythm City, from 2007-2009.He has also appeared in Gothia Caper, When We Were Black, Mtunzini.com, Nomzamo, Zabalaza, Generations: The Legacy and Ak'siSpaza.

== Early life and education ==
Mohapeloa was born on 2 April 1984 in Whittlesea in the Eastern Cape. He was raised in Maseru, Lesotho. He later finished his schooling at Queenstown Queens College Junior and Senior. Matli started a BA programme in 2004 at AFDA and completed it in 2006. He would sign with Legends Agency in 2005 and secure a lead role in an international series called Cuppen (Score). He would appeared in advertisements for brands such as Love Life, KFC and SAB.

== Career ==
Mohapeloa appeared in 2005 television series Gothia Caper and had a lead role in the 2006 SABC mini-series When We Were Black. He also made a guest appearance in Mtunzini.com. In 2009, he played Mdu in the SABC1 sitcom Nomzamo (season three). He was Moss Cele in the Mzansi Magic soap opera Zabalaza. In 2017, he had a role as Thabiso in the SABC1 soapie ''Generations: The Legacy''. In 2021, he guested as K4 in the SABC2 sitcom Ak'siSpaza.
