= Nyenye Rovers FC =

Lesotho football club

- Full name: Nyenye Rovers Football Club
- Dissolved: 2015
- Ground: St. Monica's Primary and Morate High School Stadium, Hlotse, Lesotho
- Capacity: 1,000
- League: Lesotho Premier League
- 2014–15: 13th (relegated)

Nyenye Rovers Football Club was a Lesotho football club based in Leribe.

== History ==
It was based in the city of Leribe in the Leribe District and played long time in the Lesotho Premier League. The club became in 2015, the football team of the Limkokwing University of Creative Technology and was reformed to Limkokwing University FC.

== Stadium ==
The team plays at the 1,000 capacity St. Monica's Primary and Morate High School Stadium.
