= 'Mamoshebi Kabi =

Mosotho politician

Minister of Gender, Youth and Environment
- In office 1997–1999

Minister of Transport, Post and Telecommunications
- In office 1996–1997

Member of the National Assembly
- In office 1993–1999
- Constituency: Motimposo

Personal details
- Born: 7 March 1936; Khubetsoana, Basutoland
- Died: 9 May 1999 (aged 63)

'Mamoshebi Kabi (7 March 1936 – 9 May 1999) was a Mosotho politician. She was one of the first group of women elected to the National Assembly of Lesotho in 1993.

== Biography ==
Kabi was born in Khubetsoana in 1936, the eighth child of Eliza Phakisi and reverend Elijah Phakisi. After attending the National University of Lesotho, she studied at Tennessee State University in the United States and St. Francis Xavier University in Canada. In 1958 she married Motete Kabi, with whom she had two daughters and two sons. Two years later she became a member of the Basutoland Congress Party (BCP). During the state of the emergency of the 1970s, Kabi was detained by police on fourteen occasions, and was tortured eleven times. She worked at the Institute of Extra Mural Studies at the National University of Lesotho and served as secretary general of the Women's League.

Kabi was a BCP candidate in the 1993 general elections, and was one of three women elected, becoming the first female members of the National Assembly. She was an Organisation of African Unity observer at the 1994 South African general elections. In 1996 she was appointed Minister of Transport, Post and Telecommunications. The following year she became the first Minister of Women's affairs, with the post renamed the Minister of Gender, Youth and Environment the following year. She died on 9 May 1999 following a long illness.
