= Mapule's Choice =

2008 Mosotho short film

- Directed by: Kaizer Matsumunyane
- Written by: Kaizer Matsumunyane
- Produced by: Tumelo Matobako
- Release date: 2008
- Running time: 24 min.
- Country: Lesotho
- Language: Sesotho

Mapule's Choice, is a 2008 Mosotho short film directed by Kaizer Matsumunyane and produced by Tumelo Matobako. The film deals with life of Mapule, a young garment worker from Maseru.

The film was screened and officially selected at Zanzibar International Film Festival in 2009.
