= Motlatsi Maseela =

Mosotho footballer (born 1971)

Personal information
- Full name: Motlatsi Maseela
- Date of birth: 4 October 1971 (age 55)
- Place of birth: Lesotho
- Position: Defender

Senior career*
Years	Team	Apps	(Gls)
2000–2003	Lerotholi Polytechnic		
2003–2006	Lioli Teyateyaneng		

International career^{‡}
1995–2004	Lesotho	84	(1)
- * Club domestic league appearances and goals ‡ National team caps and goals as of 10:54, 22 December 2009 (UTC)

Motlatsi Maseela (born 4 October 1971) is a Mosotho former footballer who played as a defender. Between 1995 and 2004, he won 84 caps and scored one goal for the Lesotho national football team.
