= Leslie Notši =

Mosotho footballer and manager

Personal information
- Full name: Leslie Makhetha Notši
- Date of birth: 5 September 1964 (age 62)
- Place of birth: Maseru, Lesotho
- Position: Goalkeeper

Managerial career
- Years: Team
- 2000-2006: Matlama FC
- 2006-2008: Lioli FC
- 2009: Lesotho (caretaker)
- 2011–2013: Lesotho (Under 20)
- 2014-2014: United FC
- 2014–2015: Garankuwa United F.C.
- 2015-2015: Mthatha Bucks F.C.
- 2015–2018: Kick4Life FC
- 2019: Lesotho (caretaker)
- 2021–2022: Lesotho (Assistant)
- 2022-2023: Linare FC
- 2023-2026: Lesotho
- 2025-2026: Lesotho Correctional Services FC

Leslie Notši (born 5 September 1964) is a Mosotho former footballer who played as a Goalkeeper for School Boys FC, Arsenal FC (Lesotho) and Matlama FC in Maseru. He was the head coach of the Lesotho national football team. and Lesotho Correctional Services FC in the Lesotho Premier League.

== Career ==
Between September and December 2009 he was appointed as a caretaker coach of the Lesotho national football team. In April 2011 he was appointed as the Lesotho national football team coach until December 2013. On a domestic club level he coached Matlama FC, Lioli, Kick4Life F.C. and Linare FC. He also went far as coaching South African NFD clubs such as United FC, Garankuwa United F.C. and Mthatha Bucks F.C. . In 2019, following the ill health of Moses Maliehe, Notši took up a caretaker role of Lesotho, beating South Africa on aggregate 6–2 in the African Nations Championship.
