= Thapelo Mokhele =

Mosotho footballer (born 1986)

Personal information
- Full name: Thapelo Mokhele
- Date of birth: 18 April 1986 (age 40)
- Place of birth: Lesotho
- Position: Centre back

Team information
- Current team: Matlama FC

Senior career*
Years	Team	Apps	(Gls)
2005–2007	Majantja		
2007–	Matlama FC		

International career^{‡}
2006–	Lesotho	38	(1)
- * Club domestic league appearances and goals ‡ National team caps and goals as of 08:39, 18 April 2017 (UTC)

Thapelo Mokhele (born 18 April 1986) is a Mosotho football defender.

== Club career ==
Mokhele currently plays at the club level for Matlama FC.

== International career ==
He has also won 17 caps and scored one goal for the Lesotho national football team since 2006.

=== International goals ===
Scores and results list Lesotho's goal tally first.

No	Date	Venue	Opponent	Score	Result	Competition
1.	21 June 2009	Somhlolo National Stadium, Lobamba, Swaziland	Swaziland	1–0	1–1	Friendly
