= Neo Makama =

Mosotho footballer (born 1981)

Personal information
- Full name: Neo Makama
- Date of birth: 17 March 1981 (age 45)
- Place of birth: Lesotho
- Position: Striker

Senior career*
Years	Team	Apps	(Gls)
2007–2009	Orlando Pirates		

International career^{‡}
2008–	Lesotho	4	(0)
- * Club domestic league appearances and goals ‡ National team caps and goals as of 10:32, 22 December 2009 (UTC)

Neo Makama (born 17 March 1981) is a Mosotho footballer who plays as a striker. Since 2008, he has won four caps for the Lesotho national football team.
