= Mark Sinyangwe =

Zambian footballer (1979-2011)

Mark Sinyangwe (29 December 1979 – 10 August 2011) was a Zambian football defender.

== Career ==
Sinyangwe started his soccer career at Chiwempala Leopards in Chingola before moving to Nkana F.C. After featuring for Nkana, Sinyangwe moved on to play for Nchanga Rangers, Green Buffaloes and Power Dynamos before retiring at Kitwe United.

Sinyangwe was part of the Zambian 2006 African Nations Cup team, who finished third in group C in the first round of competition, thus failing to secure qualification for the quarter-finals.

== Clubs ==
- 2000–2003: Nkana FC
- 2004: Nchanga Rangers
- 2005: Green Buffaloes
- 2006–20??: Power Dynamos

== Personal ==
On 11 August 2011, Sinyangwe, age 31, died at Mufulira's Ronald Ross Hospital after an illness. He was survived by three children.
