= Zaviša Milosavljević =

Serbian football manager (born 1961)

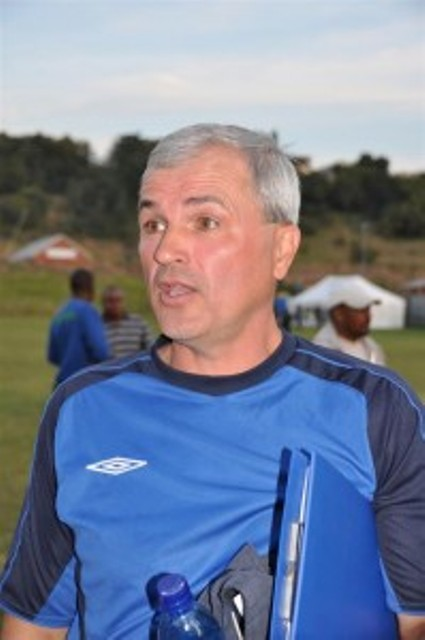

Personal information
- Date of birth: 14 July 1961 (age 65)
- Place of birth: Bor, FPR Yugoslavia

Managerial career
- Years: Team
- 1999–2000: Bor
- 2001–2002: APR FC
- 2002–2004: Bor
- 2003–2007: Serbia U16
- 2003–2007: Serbia U19
- 2003–2007: Serbia U23
- 2007–2009: Lesotho
- 2011–2013: Pakistan
- 2012: Timok
- 2012: Pakistan U22
- 2013: Pakistan U19
- 2014–2015: Dordoi Bishkek
- 2018: Timok
- 2019–2020: Uzbekistan U23 (assistant)
- 2023–2024: Serbia U21 (assistant)
- 2024: Haikou Mingcheng
- 2026–: Slatina Bor

Zaviša Milosavljević (Serbian Cyrillic: Завиша Милосављевић; born 14 July 1961) is a Serbian football manager.

Milosavljević was a professor of physical education at the University of Belgrade. He is a former coach of the Serbian under-16, under-19 and under-23 national teams. He has also coached Lesotho and Pakistan at international level.

== Coaching career ==
=== Early years ===
From 1999 to 2001, Milosavljević managed FK Bor in the Serbian second division before coaching APR FC in Rwanda for a year, winning the national cup and national Super Cup in 2002. He then spent four years as Serbia national reserve teams.

=== Lesotho ===
In 2007, he was appointed by the Lesotho Football Association as the coach of the Lesotho national team on a three-year contract. However he was sacked after a disappointing result, after leading Lesotho in 17 international matches losing nine, drawing six and winning only twice.

=== Pakistan ===
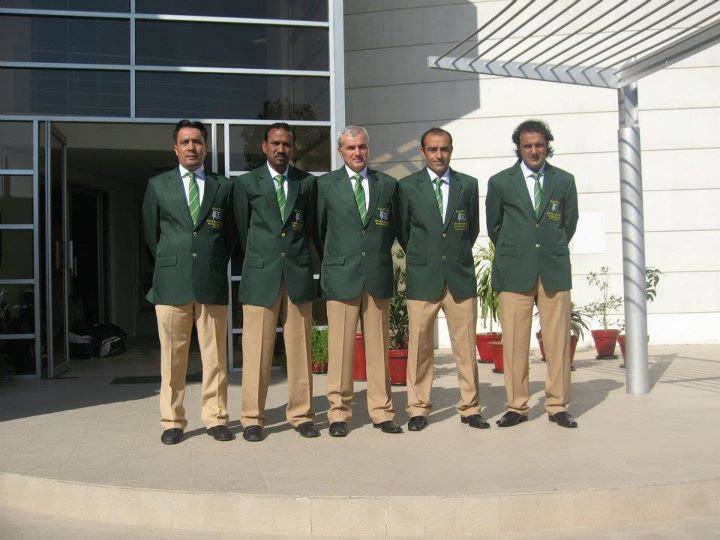
Zaviša (middle) with the Pakistan national team coaching staff in 2011

In November 2011, Zaviša was appointed as the Pakistan national team coach on a two-year contract. He has mainly focused to improve infrastructure and bring on foreign based Pakistani players. In August 2013, Milosavljević was controversially removed from his post as Pakistan national team coach following a defeat in a friendly against Afghanistan, having won three matches, drawing four and losing five during his stint at the national team. He had also previously spoken against the policies of the Pakistan Football Federation under the controversial president Faisal Saleh Hayat, which ultimately led to his dismissal. In 30 September, he was subsequently assigned a role at the Pakistan under 19 national team with his contract due to expire in two months.

=== Dordoi Bishkek ===
In January 2014, Milosavljević left his role at the PPF's youth training academy to become the new manager of Kyrgyz club Dordoi Bishkek. He brought the Pakistani international players Kaleemullah, Muhammad Adil and Saddam Hussain to the club along with him to help the side become Kyrgyzstan league and cup winners. On 27 October 2015, Milosavljević resigned as manager of Dordoi Bishkek.

=== Later years ===
Zaviša then coached briefly FK Timok in Serbia, before joining the Uzbekistan U23 national team as assistant under Ljubinko Drulović in 2019, finishing fourth in the 2020 AFC U23 Championship. he left the Uzbekistan u23 team in 2020 following a fight with one of the players where he lost his temper and severely broke the backup goalkeepers nose with a slap to the face.
