= Leomile Motsetsela =

Lesotho music artist (born 1993)

- Born: 1993 (age 32–33); Maseru, Lesotho
- Origin: Lesotho
- Genres: Afro-fusion, urban African soul music, jazz, poetry
- Occupations: Independent singer, songwriter, composer
- Instruments: Vocals, guitar
- Years active: 2010–present
- Label: Independent

Leomile Motsetsela (born 1993) is a Lesotho-born music artist. She writes and composes Afro-fusion and urban African soul music, blending them with jazz and poetic recitation, which she calls "the new gospel". Her musical storytelling genre explores African identity, decolonisation, feminism and self-love.

She hails from Maseru, Lesotho and studied film in Johannesburg, South Africa.

== Early life and career ==
Leomile was born in Thetsane West in Maseru and started writing music at the age of 9. She was part of a poetry club in Maseru. Her musical work is rooted in African storytelling traditions. She frequently integrates Sesotho folktales, traditional attire and spoken word poetry into her performances. Leomile describes her genre as "new gospel", with its lyrics uniquely revolving around personal introspection, love, African identity and empowerment. She has once told the Sunday Times that she views her music as "self-portraiture" and storytelling. In 2016, Leomile released her debut album titled Pula Molomo. The 13-track album was co-produced by Leomile and featured musicians such as Ntate Thabang Noosi, Kenridge Rambau, and Zelizwe Mthembu. The album combines English and Sesotho lyrics, and was nominated for Album of the Year and Best Newcomer at Lesotho’s Ultimate FM Music Awards.

She has since performed at various festivals, including the Standard Bank Joy of Jazz, Jammin ’N Ting in Ficksburg, the National Arts Festival in Makhanda, the Standard Bank Joy of Jazz, Basha Uhuru and the Macufe, touring and sharing the stage with Tsepo Tshola at the MTN Bushfire Festival in Eswatini, the South African State Theatre, Soweto Theatre and other venues with the likes of Msaki, Tresor, Sun-El Musician, Urban Village, and Maleh. In 2017, she launched the 'Leomile Project SADC Universities Tour', performing in Lesotho, South Africa, and Botswana.

Leomile has appeared in the movie The Leading Lady as an actor well as in a play called Mantsopa ,alongside Florence Masebe and Tseko Monaheng directed by Dr. Jerry Mofokeng.

== Discography ==
- Pula Molomo, 2016
- Ke Naleli EP, 2023
- Nevermind EP, 2024
