= Mpitsa Marai =

Mosotho footballer (born 1980)

Personal information
- Full name: Mpitsa Marai
- Date of birth: 4 February 1980 (age 46)
- Place of birth: Lesotho
- Position: Centre back

Team information
- Current team: Lesotho Prison Service

Senior career*
Years	Team	Apps	(Gls)
1999–2000	Arsenal Maseru		
2000–2011	Lesotho Prison Service		

International career^{‡}
2000–2009	Lesotho	29	(0)

Managerial career
- 2019: Lesotho
- * Club domestic league appearances and goals ‡ National team caps and goals as of 08:24, 22 December 2009 (UTC)

Mpitsa Marai (born 4 February 1980) is a retired Mosotho footballer who currently works as an assistant coach for Lesotho Prison Service. He has won 29 caps for the Lesotho national football team.

In March 2019, Marai was appointed coach of the national team for the 2020 African Nations Championship qualification for matches against South Africa.
