= Kaizer Matsumunyane =

Mosotho film director

- Education: National University of Lesotho
- Occupations: Film director, film producer, businessman

Kaizer Matsumunyane is a Mosotho film director, film producer, and businessman.

== Biography ==
Matsumunyane grew up in Lesotho and enjoyed the films of Teboho Mahlatsi, which inspired him to read the books they were based upon. Matsumunyane also wrote a cowboy story as a child, which his father would show to everyone. He recalled there not being much support for the arts in his youth, and was told that the arts did not fall under the Manpower (NMDS) portfolio when he applied for varsity sponsorship. As he pleaded his case, eventually he was admitted to film school. Matsumunyane graduated from the National University of Lesotho with a humanities degree and worked for TV Lesotho before forming his own company. He later joined the Black Star Produxions collective.

In 2006, Matsumunyane made his film debut with Untitled. In 2008, Matsumunyane directed the short film Mapule's Choice. The plot concerns a young garment worker, Mapule, who must deal with her abusive husband. While she initially tries to keep quiet, she confronts him after she notices a boy being bullied. The film was screened and selected at the Zanzibar International Film Festival in 2009.

The Hollywood film Captain Phillips was released in 2013, but Matsumunyane was upset about its portrayal of the facts of the case and Somali piracy, so he directed The Smiling Pirate later in the year. He was watching the news when he saw a story about a young pirate, Abduwali Muse, being arrested after hijacking a ship. Matsumunyane was struck that Muse was smiling, and he decided to learn more about the issue and eventually make a film. Matsumunyane spoke to Muse directly from prison and has called his 33-year sentence unjust, meant to send a message to pirates. The Smiling Pirate was supported by the Canada Council for the Arts, Toronto Arts Council, and Goterborg International Film Festival.

In 2018, Matsumunyane opened Cafe What in Maseru, the national capital. The cafe has hosted workshops, film screenings and other events, with the idea that it is a collaborative art space. It offers a food menu as well as craft beers.

Matsumunyane states that he has "a very strong faith and relationship with God." He has also said, "Being from Africa and being black, one is born misrepresented," as Lesotho often conjures images of HIV patients.

== Partial filmography ==
- 2006: Untitled
- 2008: Mapule's Choice
- 2013: The Smiling Pirate
