= Moses Maliehe =

South African soccer player and manager

Personal information
- Full name: Lehlohonolo Moses Maliehe
- Date of birth: 3 February 1966 (age 60)
- Place of birth: Klerksdorp, South Africa
- Position: Defender

Youth career
- Klerksdorp City
- –1987: ICL Birds

Senior career*
Years	Team	Apps	(Gls)
- Lioli
- Matlama
- Vaal Reef Stars
- Lioli

Managerial career
- 2005–2008: Lioli
- 2008–2015: Lesotho U20
- 2015–2016: Matlama
- 2015–2019: Lesotho
- * Club domestic league appearances and goals

Lehlohonolo Moses Maliehe (born 3 February 1966) is a South African former professional soccer player who was most recently manager of Lesotho.

== Playing career ==
Maliehe was born in Klerksdorp, South Africa to Basotho parents from Teyateyaneng, Lesotho. Maliehe played youth football in South Africa for Klerksdorp City and ICL Birds, the latter being alongside Lucas Radebe. In 1987, Maliehe moved to Lesotho, signing for Lioli and then Matlama, before returning to South Africa to sign for Vaal Reef Stars. Maliehe re-signed for Lioli upon his return to Lesotho, staying with the club until retirement.

== Managerial career ==
After a period of coaching numerous clubs in Lesotho, Maliehe was appointed Lesotho U20 manager in 2008.

In July 2015, Maliehe was named manager of former club Matlama.

On 24 November 2016, Maliehe was appointed manager of Lesotho after being interim manager of the country since November 2015. In 2019, Maliehe was replaced by Thabo Senong as Lesotho manager due to ill health.

== Honours ==
Lioli

- Lesotho Cup: 2007
