= Mochini Matete =

Mosotho footballer

Seephephe "Mochini" Matete is a Mosotho international footballer. A left-footed attacking midfielder, he is regarded as one of the most gifted footballers produced by Lesotho. He represented Lesotho in the 1974 and 1982 World Cup qualifiers. Matete played his club football for Matlama FC.

In recent years, he has been involved in coaching and as a technical director.
