= Lemohang Jeremiah Mosese =

Lesotho film director

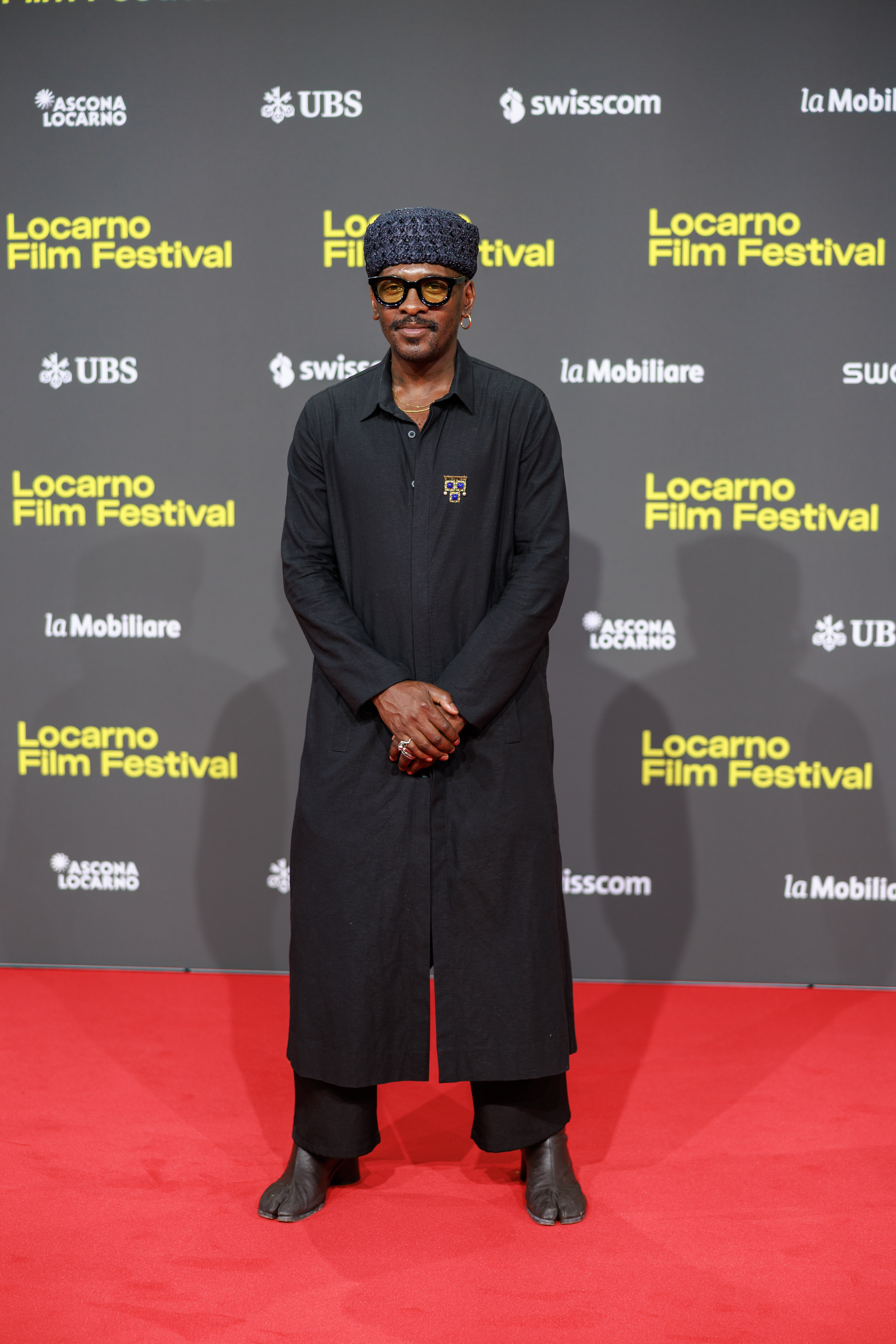
- Mosese at the 78th Locarno Film Festival in 2025
- Born: 17 January 1980 (age 46); Hlotse, Lesotho
- Occupations: Film director; screenwriter; cinematographer
- Years active: 2007-present

Lemohang Jeremiah Mosese (born 17 January 1980) is a Mosotho screenwriter, film director and visual artist. He lives in Berlin.

== Early life ==
Lemohang Jeremiah Mosese was born and grew up in Hlotse. As a child, Mosese watched 16mm B grade movies in a small abandoned community hall in his home town Hlotse. Before making films he started writing poetry.

== Career ==
He and a friend founded a production company, Vision 12, but struggled to make it financially viable. After returning to Lesotho, he made his first feature film Khapha tsa Mali (Tears of Blood) (2007), which he later disowned as "bad cinema". His follow-up work was a short film trilogy consisting of Mosonngoa (2014), Behemoth or the Game of God (2016), and video installation / short film Loss of Innocence (2008). His short films have travelled extensively, winning awards on the festival circuit.

In 2019 Mosese received critical acclaim on the film festival circuit with his feature-length essay film Mother, I Am Suffocating. This Is My Last Film About You is a docufiction essay treating the filmmaker's personal exile from Lesotho. It went on to premiere at the Berlin International Film Festival in 2019 and continues to screen at festivals and museums, including MoMA and Museum Ludwig.

In This Is Not a Burial, It's a Resurrection, a widow mourning the death of her son leads resistance to a dam that would destroy the village cemetery. It was developed through the Biennale College and screened at the 76th Venice International Film Festival, Rotterdam Film Festival 2020, Sundance Film Festival 2020 among many others. Mosese was the recipient of several awards for the film, including Special Jury Award for Visionary Filmmaking at the Sundance Film Festival.

Mosese's third feature-length film, Ancestral Visions of the Future, is described as a "look at a landscape", that being Lesotho once again. In an interview Mosese names Jamaican writer Sylvia Wynter as an inspiration for the film. The film had at its world premiere at the 75th Berlin International Film Festival and was also selected as part of the official selection in the Joburg Film Festival and the Montreal International Documentary Film Festival.

In 2025, Mosese was appointed as a member of the jury at the 78th Locarno Film Festival for Pardi di Domani - Short Film Competition.

== Themes and Inspirations ==
His films explore spiritual and political themes, and are noted for their minimal dialogue, strong poetic imagery, and preoccupation with his own childhood memories, identity as well as physical and metaphorical death.

== Filmography ==
Year	Title	Type	Ref(s).
2007	Tears of Blood	Feature film	
2008	Loss of Innocence	Short film / Video installation	
2014	Mosonngoa, The Mocked One	Short film	
2016	Behemoth: Or the Game of God	Short film	
2019	Mother, I Am Suffocating. This Is My Last Film About You	Documentary film	
2019	This Is Not a Burial, It's a Resurrection	Feature film	
2025	Ancestral Visions of the Future	Documentary film	
