= Lesotho national football team =

Men's association football team

Lesotho
- Nickname: Likuena (Crocodiles)
- Association: Lesotho Football Association (LeFA)
- Confederation: CAF (Africa)
- Sub-confederation: COSAFA (Southern Africa)
- Head coach: Bob Mafoso
- Captain: Sekhoane Moerane
- Most caps: Jane Thabantso (101)
- Top scorer: Jane Thabantso (15); Sera Motebang (15)
- Home stadium: Setsoto Stadium
- FIFA code: LES
| First colours | Second colours | Third colours |

FIFA ranking
- Current: 147 ▲3 (18 November 2026)
- Highest: 105 (August 2014)
- Lowest: 185 (August 2011)

First international
- Lesotho 2–1 Malawi (Malawi; 8 August 1970)

Biggest win
- Lesotho 5–0 Swaziland (Maseru, Lesotho; 14 April 2006)

Biggest defeat
- Zambia 9–0 Lesotho (Botswana; 8 August 1988)

COSAFA Cup
- Appearances: 22 (first in 1997)
- Best result: Runners-up (2000, 2023)
Medal record
COSAFA Cup
| Silver medal – second place | 2000 Southern Africa | Team |
| Silver medal – second place | 2023 South Africa | Team |
| Bronze medal – third place | 2018 South Africa | Team |

The Lesotho national football team, also known as LNFT, represents Lesotho in men's international association football and is governed by the Lesotho Football Association.

== History ==
Following Lesotho's independence from the United Kingdom in 1966, the Lesotho Football Association was created, and later, the Lesotho national football team, which played its first match on 7 August 1970 against Malawi, where Lesotho won 2-1.

Lesotho participated in its first World Cup qualifiers, for the 1974 tournament, drawing 0–0 against Zambia at home before losing 1–6 in the second leg and getting eliminated. Lesotho was also eliminated in the first round of qualifying for the 1974 AFCON, losing 1–5 to Mauritius after a 0–0 draw in the first leg. Lesotho faced Mauritius again in their next attempt to qualify for 1980 AFCON, losing on away goals. In qualifying for the 1982 tournament, Lesotho lost 3–7 on aggregate to Mozambique. Lesotho then faced Guinea in the 1982 World Cup first qualification round, losing 4–2 on aggregate.

Lesotho won their first ever qualification tie during the 1994 AFCON qualifiers, beating Botswana 4–0 on aggregate, with all four goals coming in the second leg in Botswana. With this victory they entered the group stage of qualifying, managing to draw against Kenya (2–2), Zaire (1–1), and Mozambique (1–1) at home, but losing all three away fixtures to finish bottom of the group.

Lesotho withdrew from the 1996 AFCON qualification and was subsequently banned from the next tournament therefore next entered the 2000 AFCON qualifiers, losing in the first round to Mauritius. Lesotho qualified for the 1999 COSAFA Cup after beating Namibia 1–0, but lost to eventual winners Angola 0–1 in the quarter-finals. The following year Lesotho produced their best ever finish at the 2000 COSAFA Cup, only qualifying for the tournament via disciplinary record. They beat Zambia 3–1 on penalties before scoring two late goals against Angola in the semi-finals to win 2–1. In the final they lost 3–0 twice across two legs to Zimbabwe to finish as runners-up.

== Results and fixtures ==
The following is a list of match results in the last 12 months, as well as any future matches that have been scheduled.

Win Draw Loss Fixture

=== 2025 ===
| 15 November Friendly | Malawi | 0–0 | Lesotho | Bloemfontein, South Africa |
| 16:00 UTC+2 | | Report | | Stadium: Toyota Stadium |

| 18 November Friendly | Malawi | 1–0 | Lesotho | Bloemfontein, South Africa |
| 16:00 UTC+2 | Malango 25' | Report | | Stadium: Toyota Stadium |

=== 2026 ===
| 26 March 2027 Africa Cup of Nations qualification | Seychelles | 0–0 | Lesotho | Bloemfontein, South Africa |
| 16:00 UTC+2 | | Report | | Stadium: Toyota Stadium; Referee: William Oloya (Uganda) |

| 29 March 2027 Africa Cup of Nations qualification | Lesotho | 2–1 | Seychelles | Bloemfontein, South Africa |
| 17:00 UTC+2 | Lesako 50'; Motebang 82' | Report | Labrosse 45+2' | Stadium: Toyota Stadium; Referee: Gerson Esono (Equatorial Guinea) |

| 4 June Friendly | Lesotho | 1–1 | Kenya | Pretoria, South Africa |
| 15:00 UTC+2 | Makhele 70' | Report | F. Odhiambo 12' | Stadium: Lucas Moripe Stadium; Referee: Jelly Chavani (South Africa) |

| 7 June Friendly | Lesotho | 0–4 | Kenya | Pretoria, South Africa |
| 15:00 UTC+2 | | Report | Bajaber 8', 52'; Ouma 84', 88' | Stadium: Lucas Moripe Stadium; Referee: Jelly Chavani (South Africa) |

| 25 September 2027 AFCON Qualifiers | Niger | 2–1 | Lesotho | Accra, Ghana |
| 15:00 UTC+0 | Sosah 38'; Sako 45' | Report | Motebang 85' (pen.) | Stadium: Accra Sports Stadium; Referee: Fabricio Duarte (Cape Verde) |

| 29 September 2027 AFCON Qualifiers | Lesotho | 0–2 | Morocco | Bloemfontein, South Africa |
| 15:00 UTC+2 | | Report | Brahim 45'; Ounahi 82' | Stadium: Free State Stadium; Referee: Abdou Abdel Mefire (Cameroon) |

| 11 November 2027 AFCON Qualifiers | Gabon | 2–0 | Lesotho | Franceville, Gabon |
| 17:00 UTC+1 | Bouanga 65', 79' (pen.) | Report | | Stadium: Franceville Stadium; Referee: Daniel Nii Laryea (Ghana) |

| 15 November 2027 AFCON Qualifiers | Lesotho | 2–1 | Gabon | Polokwane, South Africa |
| 15:00 UTC+2 | Mkhwanazi 45+1'; Motebang 49' | Report | Do Marcolino 89' | Stadium: Peter Mokaba Stadium; Referee: Sulaiman Kamara (Sierra Leone) |

=== 2027 ===
| 24 March 2027 AFCON Qualifiers | Lesotho | v | Niger | TBD, Lesotho |
| TBD | | | | Stadium: TBD |

| 28 March 2027 AFCON Qualifiers | Morocco | v | Lesotho | TBD, Morocco |
| TBD | | | | Stadium: TBD |

== Managers ==
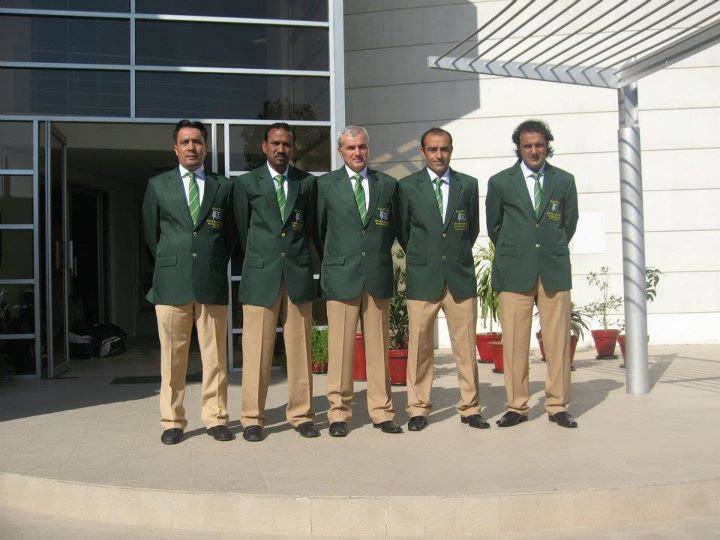
Zaviša Milosavljević, here in the middle of the Pakistan national football team staff, became the manager of Lesotho in 2007

Caretaker manager are listed in italics.

- (South Africa) April Phumo (1979–1995)
- (Lesotho) Lefa Ramakau (2000–??)
- (Lesotho) Monaheng Monyane (2003–2004)
- (Germany) Antoine Hey (2004–2006)
- (Lesotho) Motheo Mohapi (2006–2007)
- (Serbia) Zaviša Milosavljević (2007–2009)
- (Lesotho) Leslie Notši (2009)
- (Lesotho) Leslie Notši (2011–2013)
- (Lesotho) Adam Siddorn (2013)
- (Lesotho) Seephephe Matete (2014–2015)
- (South Africa) Moses Maliehe (2015–2019)
- (Lesotho) Mpitsa Marai (2019)
- (South Africa) Thabo Senong (2019–2021)
- (Lesotho) Leslie Notši (2021–2022)
- (Serbia) Veselin Jelušić (2022–2023)
- (Lesotho) Leslie Notši (2023–present)

== Players ==
=== Current squad ===
The following players were selected for the 2026 FIFA World Cup qualification – CAF Group C matches against South Africa and Rwanda on 21 and 25 March 2025.

Caps and goals correct as of 25 March 2025, after the match against Rwanda.

| No. | Pos. | Player | Date of birth (age) | Caps | Goals | Club |
|---|---|---|---|---|---|---|
| | GK | Sekhoane Moerane | 18 September 1997 (age 29) | 48 | 1 | (South African Football Association) Orbit College |
| | GK | Tankiso Chaba | 27 December 1995 (age 30) | 7 | 0 | (Lesotho Football Association) Lesotho Correctional Services |
| | GK | Nthebe Majoro | 21 July 1998 (age 28) | 0 | 0 | (Lesotho Football Association) Police Service |
| | DF | Rethabile Rasethuntsa | 22 November 1994 (age 31) | 45 | 1 | (Lesotho Football Association) Linare |
| | DF | Motlomelo Mkhwanazi | 5 November 1994 (age 32) | 40 | 1 | (South African Football Association) Kruger United |
| | DF | Thabang Malane | 10 June 1997 (age 29) | 40 | 0 | (South African Football Association) African All Stars |
| | DF | Rethabile Mokokoane | 6 April 1996 (age 30) | 22 | 1 | (Lesotho Football Association) Matlama |
| | DF | Thabo Makhele | 17 December 1994 (age 31) | 13 | 0 | (South African Football Association) Chippa United |
| | DF | Lehlohonolo Matsau | 6 March 1997 (age 29) | 13 | 0 | (Lesotho Football Association) Lesotho Defence Force |
| | DF | Thato Sefoli | 22 May 1995 (age 31) | 8 | 0 | (South African Football Association) Upington City |
| | DF | Fusi Matlabe | 23 May 2000 (age 26) | 5 | 0 | (South African Football Association) Mpheni Home Defenders |
| | MF | Tsepo Toloane | 15 July 1997 (age 29) | 57 | 0 | (Lesotho Football Association) Lesotho Defence Force |
| | MF | Lisema Lebokollane | 25 February 1993 (age 33) | 54 | 0 | (Lesotho Football Association) Matlama |
| | MF | Lehlohonolo Fothoane | 23 February 1997 (age 29) | 42 | 3 | (Botswana Football Association) Township Rollers |
| | MF | Tshwarelo Bereng | 30 October 1990 (age 36) | 42 | 2 | (South African Football Association) Orbit College |
| | MF | Thabo Matšoele | 23 May 1993 (age 33) | 20 | 0 | (Lesotho Football Association) Linare |
| | MF | Mokoteli Mohapi | 24 January 1998 (age 28) | 2 | 0 | (Lesotho Football Association) Lioli |
| | FW | Hlompho Kalake | 2 September 1994 (age 32) | 60 | 9 | (Lesotho Football Association) Bantu |
| | FW | Neo Mokhachane | 22 September 1996 (age 30) | 26 | 4 | (Botswana Football Association) Jwaneng Galaxy |
| | FW | Katleho Makateng | 20 September 1998 (age 28) | 27 | 3 | (Lesotho Football Association) Lesotho Defence Force |
| | FW | Lemohang Lintša | 3 April 1992 (age 34) | 7 | 0 | (Lesotho Football Association) Limkokwing University |
| | FW | Mohlomi Makhetha | 21 September 2000 (age 26) | 6 | 0 | (Lesotho Football Association) Lesotho Correctional Services |
| | FW | Keketso Snyder | 16 October 1990 (age 36) | 3 | 0 | (Lesotho Football Association) Lesotho Correctional Services |

=== Recent call-ups ===
The following players have also been called up to the Lesotho squad within the last twelve months.

| Pos. | Player | Date of birth (age) | Caps | Goals | Club | Latest call-up |
|---|---|---|---|---|---|---|
^{INJ} Withdrew due to injury^{PRE} Preliminary squad / standby^{RET} Retired from the national team^{SUS} Serving suspension^{WD} Player withdrew from the squad due to non-injury issue.

== Player records ==
As of 18 November 2025
Players in bold are still active with Lesotho.

=== Most appearances ===
| Rank | Player | Caps | Goals | Career |
|---|---|---|---|---|
| 1 | **Jane Thabantso** | 99 | 15 | 2014–present |
| 2 | **Sera Motebang** | 76 | 12 | 2016–present |
| 3 | Basia Makepe | 69 | 1 | 2012–2023 |
| 4 | Nkau Lerotholi | 68 | 2 | 2008–2021 |
| 5 | **Tšepo Toloane** | 65 | 0 | 2018–present |
| 6 | **Hlompho Kalake** | 63 | 11 | 2015–present |
| 7 | **Lisema Lebokollane** | 56 | 0 | 2019–present |
| 8 | **Sekhoane Moerane** | 55 | 1 | 2019–present |
| 9 | Tšoanelo Koetle | 54 | 2 | 2011–2021 |
| 10 | Bushi Moletsane | 53 | 3 | 2004–2015 |

=== Top goalscorers ===
| Rank | Player | Goals | Caps | Ratio | Career |
|---|---|---|---|---|---|
| 1 | **Jane Thabantso** | 15 | 99 | 0.15 | 2014–present |
| 2 | **Sera Motebang** | 12 | 76 | 0.16 | 2016–present |
| 3 | **Hlompho Kalake** | 11 | 63 | 0.17 | 2015–present |
| 4 | Refiloe Potse | 9 | 23 | 0.39 | 1998–2009 |
| 5 | Tsepo Seturumane | 8 | 38 | 0.21 | 2013–2020 |
| 6 | Thapelo Tale | 7 | 45 | 0.16 | 2008–2019 |
| 7 | Teele Ntšonyana | 5 | 19 | 0.26 | 1995–2004 |
| 7 | Majara Masupha | 5 | 20 | 0.25 | 1998–2004 |
| 7 | Motlatsi Shale | 5 | 22 | 0.23 | 1998–2006 |
| 10 | Thulo Ranchobe | 4 | 23 | 0.17 | 2003–2013 |
| 10 | Sello Muso | 4 | 29 | 0.14 | 2006–2009 |
| 10 | **Neo Mokhachane** | 4 | 30 | 0.13 | 2021–present |
| 10 | Lehlohonolo Seema | 4 | 35 | 0.11 | 1998–2008 |
| 10 | Ralekoti Mokhahlane | 4 | 38 | 0.11 | 2006–2018 |
| 10 | Bokang Mothoana | 4 | 39 | 0.1 | 2005–2017 |
| 10 | **Lehlohonolo Fothoane** | 4 | 47 | 0.09 | 2017–present |

== Competitive record ==
=== FIFA World Cup ===
| FIFA World Cup record | | | | | | | | | Qualification record | | | | | |
| Year | Round | Position | Pld | W | D* | L | GF | GA | Pld | W | D | L | GF | GA |
|---|---|---|---|---|---|---|---|---|---|---|---|---|---|---|
| 1930 to 1962 | Part of United Kingdom | | | | | | | | Part of United Kingdom | | | | | |
| 1966 and 1970 | Did not enter | | | | | | | | Did not enter | | | | | |
| (West Germany) 1974 | Did not qualify | | | | | | | | 2 | 0 | 1 | 1 | 1 | 6 |
| (Argentina) 1978 | Did not enter | | | | | | | | Did not enter | | | | | |
| (Spain) 1982 | Did not qualify | | | | | | | | 2 | 0 | 1 | 1 | 2 | 4 |
| (Mexico) 1986 | Withdrew | | | | | | | | Withdrew | | | | | |
| (Italy) 1990 | Withdrew | | | | | | | | Withdrew | | | | | |
| 1994 and 1998 | Did not enter | | | | | | | | Did not enter | | | | | |
| (South Korea) (Japan) 2002 | Did not qualify | | | | | | | | 2 | 0 | 0 | 2 | 0 | 3 |
| (Germany) 2006 | Did not qualify | | | | | | | | 2 | 0 | 1 | 1 | 1 | 4 |
| (South Africa) 2010 | Did not qualify | | | | | | | | 6 | 0 | 0 | 6 | 2 | 16 |
| (Brazil) 2014 | Did not qualify | | | | | | | | 8 | 2 | 3 | 3 | 7 | 17 |
| (Russia) 2018 | Did not qualify | | | | | | | | 2 | 0 | 2 | 0 | 1 | 1 |
| (Qatar) 2022 | Did not qualify | | | | | | | | 2 | 0 | 2 | 0 | 1 | 1 |
| (Canada) (Mexico) (United States) 2026 | Did not qualify | | | | | | | | 10 | 3 | 3 | 4 | 9 | 12 |
| (Morocco) (Portugal) (Spain) 2030 | To be determined | | | | | | | | To be determined | | | | | |
| (Saudi Arabia) 2034 | To be determined | | | | | | | | To be determined | | | | | |
| Total | | 0/15 | | | | | | | 36 | 5 | 13 | 18 | 24 | 64 |

=== Africa Cup of Nations ===
| Africa Cup of Nations record | | | | | | | | | Qualification record | | | | | |
| Year | Round | Position | Pld | W | D* | L | GF | GA | Pld | W | D* | L | GF | GA |
|---|---|---|---|---|---|---|---|---|---|---|---|---|---|---|
| (Sudan) 1957 | Part of United Kingdom | | | | | | | | Part of United Kingdom | | | | | |
| (United Arab Republic) 1959 | Part of United Kingdom | | | | | | | | Part of United Kingdom | | | | | |
| (Ethiopia) 1962 | Part of United Kingdom | | | | | | | | Part of United Kingdom | | | | | |
| (Ghana) 1963 | Part of United Kingdom | | | | | | | | Part of United Kingdom | | | | | |
| (Tunisia) 1965 | Did not enter | | | | | | | | Did not enter | | | | | |
| (Ethiopia) 1968 | Did not enter | | | | | | | | Did not enter | | | | | |
| (Sudan) 1970 | Did not enter | | | | | | | | Did not enter | | | | | |
| (Cameroon) 1972 | Did not enter | | | | | | | | Did not enter | | | | | |
| (Egypt) 1974 | Did not qualify | | | | | | | | 2 | 0 | 1 | 1 | 1 | 5 |
| (Ethiopia) 1976 | Withdrew | | | | | | | | Withdrew | | | | | |
| (Ghana) 1978 | Did not enter | | | | | | | | Did not enter | | | | | |
| (Nigeria) 1980 | Did not qualify | | | | | | | | 2 | 1 | 0 | 1 | 2 | 2 |
| (Libya) 1982 | Did not qualify | | | | | | | | 2 | 1 | 0 | 1 | 3 | 7 |
| (Ivory Coast) 1984 | Withdrew | | | | | | | | Withdrew | | | | | |
| (Egypt) 1986 | Did not enter | | | | | | | | Did not enter | | | | | |
| (Morocco) 1988 | Withdrew | | | | | | | | Withdrew | | | | | |
| (Algeria) 1990 | Did not enter | | | | | | | | Did not enter | | | | | |
| (Senegal) 1992 | Did not enter | | | | | | | | Did not enter | | | | | |
| (Tunisia) 1994 | Did not qualify | | | | | | | | 8 | 1 | 4 | 3 | 8 | 17 |
| (South Africa) 1996 | Withdrew during qualifying | | | | | | | | 6 | 1 | 0 | 5 | 3 | 16 |
| (Burkina Faso) 1998 | Banned | | | | | | | | Banned for withdrawing in 1996 | | | | | |
| (Ghana) (Nigeria) 2000 | Did not qualify | | | | | | | | 2 | 0 | 1 | 1 | 2 | 4 |
| (Mali) 2002 | Did not qualify | | | | | | | | 7 | 2 | 3 | 3 | 8 | 10 |
| (Tunisia) 2004 | Did not qualify | | | | | | | | 4 | 1 | 0 | 3 | 1 | 10 |
| (Egypt) 2006 | Did not qualify | | | | | | | | 2 | 0 | 1 | 1 | 1 | 4 |
| (Ghana) 2008 | Did not qualify | | | | | | | | 6 | 1 | 1 | 4 | 3 | 9 |
| (Angola) 2010 | Did not qualify | | | | | | | | 6 | 0 | 0 | 6 | 2 | 16 |
| (Equatorial Guinea) (Gabon) 2012 | Did not enter | | | | | | | | Did not enter | | | | | |
| (South Africa) 2013 | Did not qualify | | | | | | | | 2 | 0 | 1 | 1 | 0 | 1 |
| (Equatorial Guinea) 2015 | Did not qualify | | | | | | | | 10 | 2 | 3 | 5 | 6 | 13 |
| (Gabon) 2017 | Did not qualify | | | | | | | | 6 | 1 | 0 | 5 | 5 | 16 |
| (Egypt) 2019 | Did not qualify | | | | | | | | 6 | 1 | 3 | 2 | 3 | 7 |
| (Cameroon) 2021 | Did not qualify | | | | | | | | 6 | 0 | 3 | 3 | 3 | 9 |
| (Ivory Coast) 2023 | Did not qualify | | | | | | | | 8 | 1 | 2 | 5 | 4 | 10 |
| (Morocco) 2025 | Did not qualify | | | | | | | | 6 | 1 | 1 | 4 | 2 | 13 |
| (Kenya) (Tanzania) (Uganda) 2027 | To be determined | | | | | | | | To be determined | | | | | |
| 2029 | To be determined | | | | | | | | To be determined | | | | | |
| Total | | 0/35 | | | | | | | 91 | 14 | 24 | 53 | 57 | 169 |

=== COSAFA Cup ===
| Year | COSAFA Cup record | | | | | | | |
| Year | Round | Result | Pld | W | D | L | GF | GA |
|---|---|---|---|---|---|---|---|---|
| 1997 | Preliminary round | 7th | 1 | 0 | 0 | 1 | 0 | 2 |
| 1998 | Preliminary round | 10th | 1 | 0 | 0 | 1 | 0 | 2 |
| 1999 | Quarter-finals | 8th | 2 | 1 | 0 | 1 | 1 | 1 |
| 2000 | Runners-up | 2nd | 5 | 1 | 1 | 3 | 3 | 9 |
| 2001 | Quarter-finals | 7th | 1 | 0 | 0 | 1 | 1 | 2 |
| 2002 | First round | 12th | 1 | 0 | 0 | 1 | 0 | 2 |
| 2003 | First round | 9th | 1 | 0 | 1 | 0 | 0 | 0 |
| 2004 | First round | 9th | 1 | 0 | 1 | 0 | 0 | 0 |
| 2005 | First round | 8th | 1 | 0 | 0 | 1 | 1 | 2 |
| 2006 | First round | 7th | 2 | 0 | 1 | 1 | 1 | 3 |
| 2007 | First round | 11th | 2 | 0 | 0 | 2 | 2 | 5 |
| (South Africa) 2008 | Preliminary round | 12th | 3 | 1 | 1 | 1 | 2 | 2 |
| (Zimbabwe) 2009 | Group stage | 10th | 2 | 1 | 1 | 0 | 3 | 2 |
| (Zambia) 2013 | Fourth place | 4th | 6 | 1 | 3 | 2 | 10 | 10 |
| (South Africa) 2015 | Group stage | 11th | 3 | 1 | 0 | 2 | 2 | 4 |
| (Namibia) 2016 | Quarter-finals | 7th | 5 | 3 | 1 | 1 | 9 | 4 |
| (South Africa) 2017 | Fourth place | 4th | 3 | 0 | 2 | 1 | 3 | 4 |
| (South Africa) 2018 | Third place | 3rd | 3 | 2 | 1 | 0 | 2 | 0 |
| (South Africa) 2019 | Fourth place | 4th | 3 | 0 | 2 | 1 | 3 | 4 |
| (South Africa) 2021 | Group stage | 8th | 4 | 1 | 0 | 3 | 3 | 12 |
| (South Africa) 2022 | Group stage | 10th | 3 | 2 | 0 | 1 | 4 | 4 |
| (South Africa) 2023 | Runners-up | 2nd | 5 | 2 | 1 | 2 | 6 | 6 |
| Total | Runners-up | 22/22 | 58 | 16 | 16 | 26 | 56 | 80 |

== Head-to-head record ==
As of 29 September 2026 after match against Morocco

Positive Record Neutral Record Negative Record

| Opponent | Pld | W | D | L | GF | GA | GD |
|---|---|---|---|---|---|---|---|
| Algeria | 2 | 0 | 0 | 2 | 1 | 9 | −8 |
| Angola | 11 | 1 | 1 | 9 | 7 | 27 | −20 |
| Benin | 2 | 0 | 1 | 1 | 0 | 4 | –4 |
| Botswana | 31 | 5 | 11 | 15 | 23 | 39 | −16 |
| Burkina Faso | 2 | 0 | 0 | 2 | 0 | 3 | −3 |
| Burundi | 2 | 1 | 1 | 0 | 3 | 2 | +1 |
| Cameroon | 2 | 1 | 0 | 1 | 3 | 4 | −1 |
| Cape Verde | 2 | 0 | 2 | 0 | 1 | 1 | 0 |
| Central African Republic | 2 | 1 | 0 | 1 | 2 | 3 | –1 |
| Comoros | 7 | 2 | 2 | 3 | 3 | 6 | –3 |
| DR Congo | 7 | 0 | 4 | 3 | 4 | 17 | −13 |
| Ethiopia | 9 | 2 | 4 | 3 | 10 | 11 | –1 |
| Gabon | 6 | 0 | 2 | 4 | 3 | 12 | −9 |
| Gambia | 2 | 1 | 0 | 1 | 1 | 6 | −5 |
| Ghana | 7 | 0 | 1 | 6 | 7 | 23 | −16 |
| Guinea | 2 | 0 | 1 | 1 | 2 | 4 | −2 |
| Ivory Coast | 2 | 0 | 1 | 1 | 0 | 1 | –1 |
| Kenya | 10 | 1 | 5 | 4 | 7 | 15 | −8 |
| Laos | 1 | 1 | 0 | 0 | 3 | 1 | +2 |
| Liberia | 2 | 1 | 0 | 1 | 2 | 1 | +1 |
| Libya | 2 | 0 | 0 | 2 | 0 | 5 | −5 |
| Madagascar | 3 | 1 | 0 | 2 | 3 | 4 | −1 |
| Malawi | 25 | 5 | 6 | 14 | 17 | 47 | −30 |
| Malaysia | 1 | 0 | 0 | 1 | 0 | 5 | −5 |
| Mauritius | 16 | 8 | 3 | 5 | 27 | 23 | +4 |
| Morocco | 3 | 0 | 0 | 3 | 0 | 10 | −10 |
| Mozambique | 24 | 4 | 7 | 13 | 10 | 33 | −23 |
| Myanmar | 1 | 0 | 0 | 1 | 0 | 1 | −1 |
| Namibia | 15 | 4 | 5 | 6 | 14 | 18 | –4 |
| Niger | 3 | 1 | 0 | 2 | 4 | 5 | –1 |
| Nigeria | 6 | 0 | 1 | 5 | 4 | 13 | −9 |
| Rwanda | 2 | 0 | 1 | 1 | 1 | 2 | −1 |
| São Tomé and Príncipe | 2 | 0 | 1 | 1 | 0 | 1 | −1 |
| Senegal | 2 | 0 | 0 | 2 | 0 | 4 | −4 |
| Seychelles | 8 | 4 | 3 | 1 | 10 | 7 | +3 |
| Sierra Leone | 2 | 0 | 2 | 0 | 1 | 1 | 0 |
| South Africa | 17 | 2 | 5 | 10 | 10 | 31 | −21 |
| Sudan | 2 | 1 | 1 | 0 | 3 | 1 | +2 |
| Eswatini | 43 | 12 | 14 | 17 | 42 | 51 | −9 |
| Tanzania | 5 | 2 | 2 | 1 | 4 | 5 | −1 |
| Togo | 1 | 0 | 0 | 1 | 0 | 2 | −2 |
| Uganda | 5 | 0 | 2 | 3 | 0 | 8 | −8 |
| Zambia | 18 | 1 | 6 | 11 | 10 | 43 | −33 |
| Zimbabwe | 26 | 4 | 7 | 15 | 26 | 54 | −28 |
| Total | 343 | 66 | 102 | 175 | 268 | 563 | −295 |

== Honours ==
=== Regional ===
- COSAFA Cup
  - (silver) Runners-up (2): 2000, 2023
  - (bronze) Third place (1): 2018

== Kit suppliers ==
- (Germany) Uhlsport (2000)
- (United Kingdom) Umbro (2002, 2006)
- (Germany) Uhlsport (2007)
- (Germany) Adidas (2008–2011)
- (Lesotho) Basutoland Ink (2012–2019)
- (United Kingdom) Umbro (2019–)
