= Margaret E. Knight =

American inventor (1838–1914)

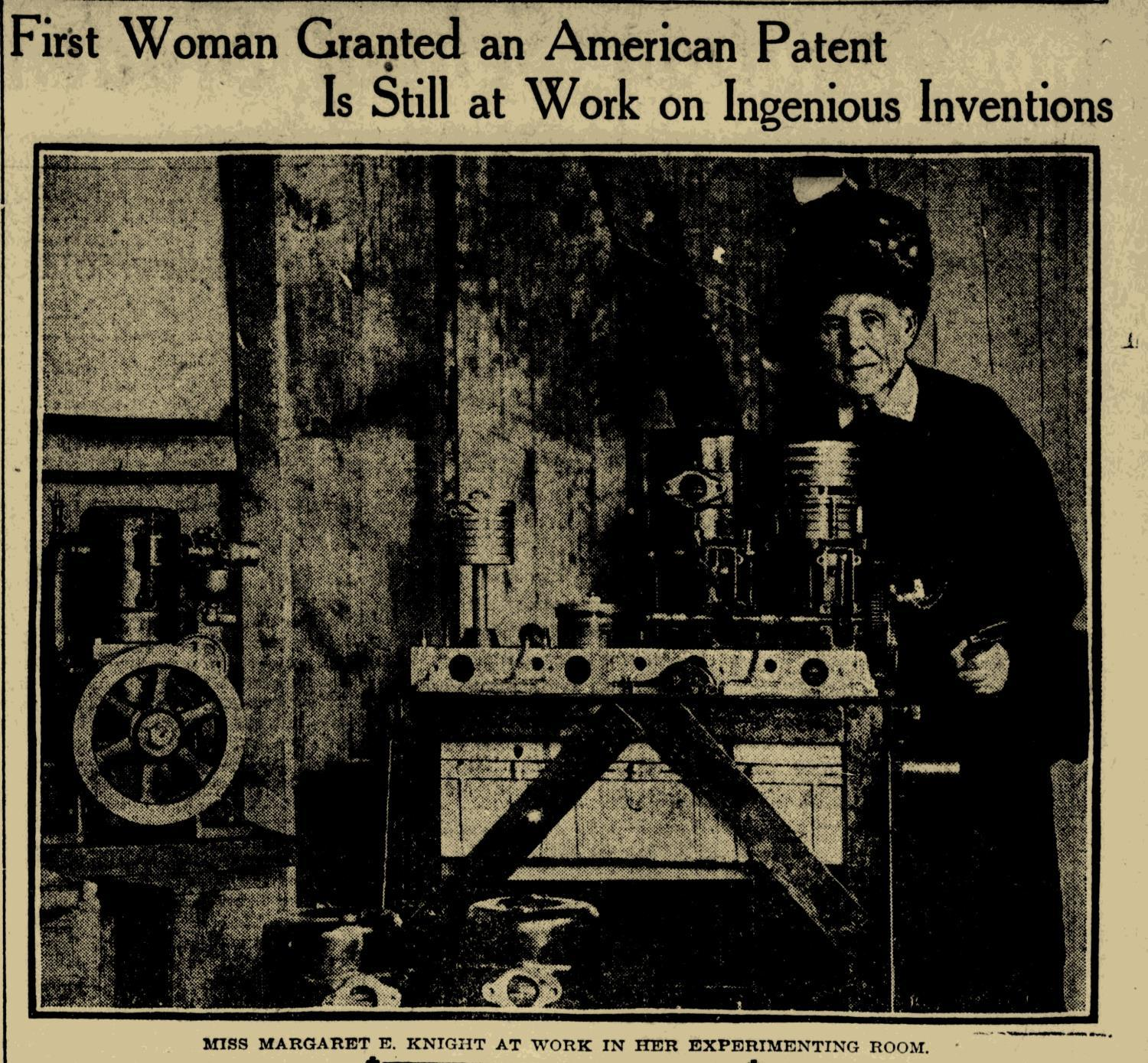
- Knight in 1912
- Born: Margaret Eloise Knight; February 14, 1838; York, Maine, U.S.
- Died: October 12, 1914 (aged 76); Framingham, Massachusetts, U.S.
- Occupation: Inventor
- Known for: Machine to produce flat-bottomed paper bags
- Notable work: Paper bag machine
- Parent(s): Hannah Teal and James Knight
- Awards: National Inventors Hall of Fame

Margaret Eloise Knight (February 14, 1838 – October 12, 1914) was an American inventor, notably of a machine to produce flat-bottomed paper bags. She has been called "the most famous 19th-century woman inventor". She founded the Eastern Paper Bag Company in 1870, creating paper bags for groceries similar in form to the ones that would be used in later generations. Knight received dozens of patents in different fields and became a symbol for women's empowerment.

== Early life ==
Margaret E. Knight was born in York, Maine, on February 14, 1838, to Hannah Teal and James Knight. As a little girl, “Mattie,” as her parents and friends nicknamed her, preferred to play with woodworking tools instead of dolls, stating that “the only things [she] wanted were a jack knife, a gimlet, and pieces of wood.” She was known as a child for her kites and sleds.

Knight and her brothers, Charlie and Jim, were raised by their widowed mother; Knight's father died when she was young, after which the impoverished family moved to Manchester, New Hampshire, where employment was available in the cotton mills. Any formal education she had was limited to secondary school, as she left to work in the mills at age 12 with her siblings.

12-year-old Knight witnessed an accident at the mill in which a worker was stabbed by a steel-tipped shuttle that shot out of a mechanical loom. Within weeks she invented a safety device for the loom, which was later adopted by other Manchester mills. The device was never patented and its exact nature is unknown, though it may have been either a device to stop the loom when the shuttle thread broke or a guard to physically block a flying shuttle.

Health problems precluded Knight from continuing to work at the cotton mill. In her teens and early 20s she held several jobs, including in home repair, daguerreotype photography, engraving, and furniture upholstery.

== Career ==
Knight's first patent, issued in 1870, was for an "improvement in paper-feeding machines", a "pneumatic paper-feeder" with applications in printing presses and paper-folding machines; her paper bag machine would feature a three-step folding process in forming the flat bottom. At the time, many female inventors and writers concealed their gender by using only an initial instead of their given name, but Margaret E. Knight was identified in this patent.

=== Flat-bottomed paper bag machine ===
Knight moved to Springfield, Massachusetts in 1867 and was hired by the Columbia Paper Bag Company. She noticed that the envelope-shaped machine-made paper bags they produced were weak and narrow, and could not stand on their bases. They were also poorly suited to bulky items, such as groceries and hardware goods. Machines for producing these envelope-style bags were the subject of three patents issued to Francis Wolle in 1852, 1855, and 1858. Flat-bottomed paper bags, which were sturdier and more useful, were expensively made by hand.

Such flat-bottomed bags were already in general use in Britain since at least the 1840s and improvements to hand-production techniques occurred during the 1850s. For example, a patent was awarded to James Baldwin of Birmingham in 1853 for semi-mechanized apparatus to use in the making of flat-bottomed paper bags. However, thinking to more fully automate the process, in 1868 Knight invented a machine that cut, folded, and glued paper to form the flat-bottomed brown paper bag familiar to shoppers today. This machine enabled the mass manufacture of flat-bottomed bags, increasing the speed of production.

Knight built a wooden prototype of the device, but needed a working iron model to apply for a patent. Charles Annan (or Anan), a machinist who visited the machine shop where Knight's iron model was being built, stole her design and patented it first. When Knight attempted to patent her work, she discovered Annan's patent and filed a patent interference lawsuit in the fall of 1870. Annan argued that "she could not possibly understand the mechanical complexities of the machine", possibly exploiting prejudice against women, and/or that his was a different machine (likely on the basis of details he had misremembered), and that she had not succeeded in creating a working machine. Some authors, such as Ryan Smith of the Smithsonian Magazine, state Annan argued no woman could have designed the machine, though according to Michael Abrams of the American Society of Mechanical Engineers, this is a modern exaggeration of Annan's sole argument that his was a different machine. Knight responded with copious evidence in the form of meticulous hand-drawn blueprints, journals, and models, and a number of witnesses who testified that she had been making drawings and models beginning in 1867. She spent the then-large sum of $100 (equivalent to $2,546 in 2025) per day in legal costs for the 16-day hearing, which resulted in victory. She received her patent in 1871.

For her invention of the paper bag machine, Knight was decorated by Queen Victoria of the United Kingdom in 1871.

With a Massachusetts business partner, Knight established the Eastern Paper Bag Company in Hartford, Connecticut. Having no interest in managing a business, she instead received royalties from the Eastern Paper Bag Company and continued to work as an inventor. She acquired a further patent in 1879 for improvements to the paper bag machine. It was also assigned to Eastern. Though Knight earned a comfortable income from her paper bag royalties, they were however capped at $25,000 and therefore ended after a time. She would continue in this pattern for the rest of her career, selling her various inventions to companies to live on royalties and patent sales.

Knight moved to Ashland and then Framingham, Massachusetts, working in an office in downtown Boston.

=== Later inventions ===
In the 1880s Knight designed three domestic inventions. She patented a dress and skirt shield in 1883, a clasp for robes in 1884, and a cooking spit in 1885. In the 1880s and 1890s Knight worked on machines for manufacturing shoes, receiving six patents for several machines used in cutting shoe materials. In the early 1900s Knight developed several components for rotary engines and motors, with patents being granted in 1902 to 1915 (after her death).

Her many other inventions include two patents of 1894: a numbering machine, and a window frame and sash. In total she was granted at least 27 and possibly 30 patents, though she also invented many devices she did not patent.

== Later life ==
Knight continued her work late into life. A 1913 article in The New York Times reported that she was "working twenty hours a day on her eighty-ninth invention."

Knight was never wealthy, though she lived more comfortably as an adult than in childhood. Knight never married and died alone on October 12, 1914, at the age of 76, leaving an estate worth only $275.05.

== Legacy ==
I’m only sorry I couldn’t have had as good a chance as a boy, and have been put to my trade regularly.

— Margaret Knight, reflecting late in life

As a female inventor, Knight faced certain challenges and limits. At the time Knight patented her paper bag machine women held a tiny fraction of patents. In 2019 fewer than 10% of primary inventor patent holders were female.

An obituary described Knight as a "woman Edison". Late in her life, Knight was recognized as a leader among women, her achievements held as an example by women's rights activists and suffragettes. She was profiled in several pro-suffrage newspapers and magazines alongside other women inventors as "lady Edisons". She was featured in a 1913 New York Times article, "Women Who Are Inventors," which rebutted the idea of female intellectual inferiority. The 1913 article was written in response to a certain physician's controversial opinion that women had their place in literature but were not inventive; he pointed to the few women recorded as eminent artists, composers, inventors or even professions thought feminine, such as chefs and fashion designers. The article responded that women had been sequestered in domestic work and denied creative opportunities, and pointed to nine women inventors of the day, Knight foremost among them.

A plaque recognizing her as the "first woman awarded a U.S. patent" and holder of 87 U.S. patents hangs on the Curry Cottage at 287 Hollis St in Framingham. However, Knight was not actually the first: either Mary Kies, Hannah Slater, or Hazel Irwin, who received a patent for a cheese press in 1808, holds that honor.

The flat-bottomed paper bag machine was Knight's most successful invention. Knight's bags differed somewhat from modern ones. They did not have accordion-folded sides like modern bags, which are therefore more compact in storage and have more defined corners; Luther Crowell patented an accordion-pleated bag in 1872. Another feature developed later was easy unfolding into a square-bottomed shape. Paper bags replaced cloth sacks, crates, and boxes for shopping, and were standard for nearly a century before being replaced by disposable plastic bags, for which a cheap manufacturing process was developed in the 1970s and 80s.

Knight was inducted into the National Inventors Hall of Fame in 2006. A scaled-down but fully functional patent model of her original bag-making machine is in the National Museum of American History in Washington, D.C.

In 2025, Knight and the Flat-Bottomed Paper Bag were included in Pirouette: Turning Points in Design, an exhibition at the Museum of Modern Art featuring "widely recognized design icons [...] highlighting pivotal moments in design history."

== Patents ==
- Compound Rotary Engine. US716903A • 1902-12-30
- Rotary Engine. US717869A • 1903-01-06
- Rotary engine. US720818A • 1903-02-17
- Rotary engine. US730543A • 1903-06-09
- Automatic Tool For Boring Or Planing Concave Or Cylindrical Surfaces. US743293A • 1903-11-03
- Rotary engine. US758321A • 1904-04-26
- Rotary-Motor. US777832A • 1904-12-20
- Resilient Wheel. US1015761A • 1912-01-23
- Internal-Combustion Engine. US1068781A • 1913-07-29. K D Motor Company
- Packing-Ring. US1086299A • 1914-02-03. K D Motor Company
- Internal-Combustion Engine. US1132858A • 1915-03-23. K D Motor Company
- Improvement in paper-feeding machines. US US109224A. Granted 1870-11-15
- Improvement in paper-bag machines. US US220925A. Granted 1879-10-28.
- Paper-bag machine. USRE9202E. Granted 1880-05-18.
- Skirt-protector. US US282646A. Granted 1883-08-07, with Harriet M. Macfarland.
- Clasp. US US306692A. Granted 1884-10-14.
- Spit. US US311662A. Granted 1885-02-03.
- Sole-cutting machine. US US436358A. Granted 1890-09-16.
- Machine for cutting shoe soles. US US436359A. Granted 1890-09-16.
- Sole cutting machine. US US444982A. Granted 1891-01-20.
- Sole-cutting machine. US US494784A.
- Window frame and sash. US US519333A. Granted 1894-05-08. With Albert B. Harrington
- Winding reel. US US521413A. Granted 1894-06-12. With Robert D. Evans And John S. Lockwood.
- Machine for cutting boots or shoe soles. US US524286A. Granted 1894-08-07.
- Numbering mechanism. US US527205A. Granted 1894-10-09. With Charles S. Gooding.
- Reel. US US527368A. Granted 1894-10-09.
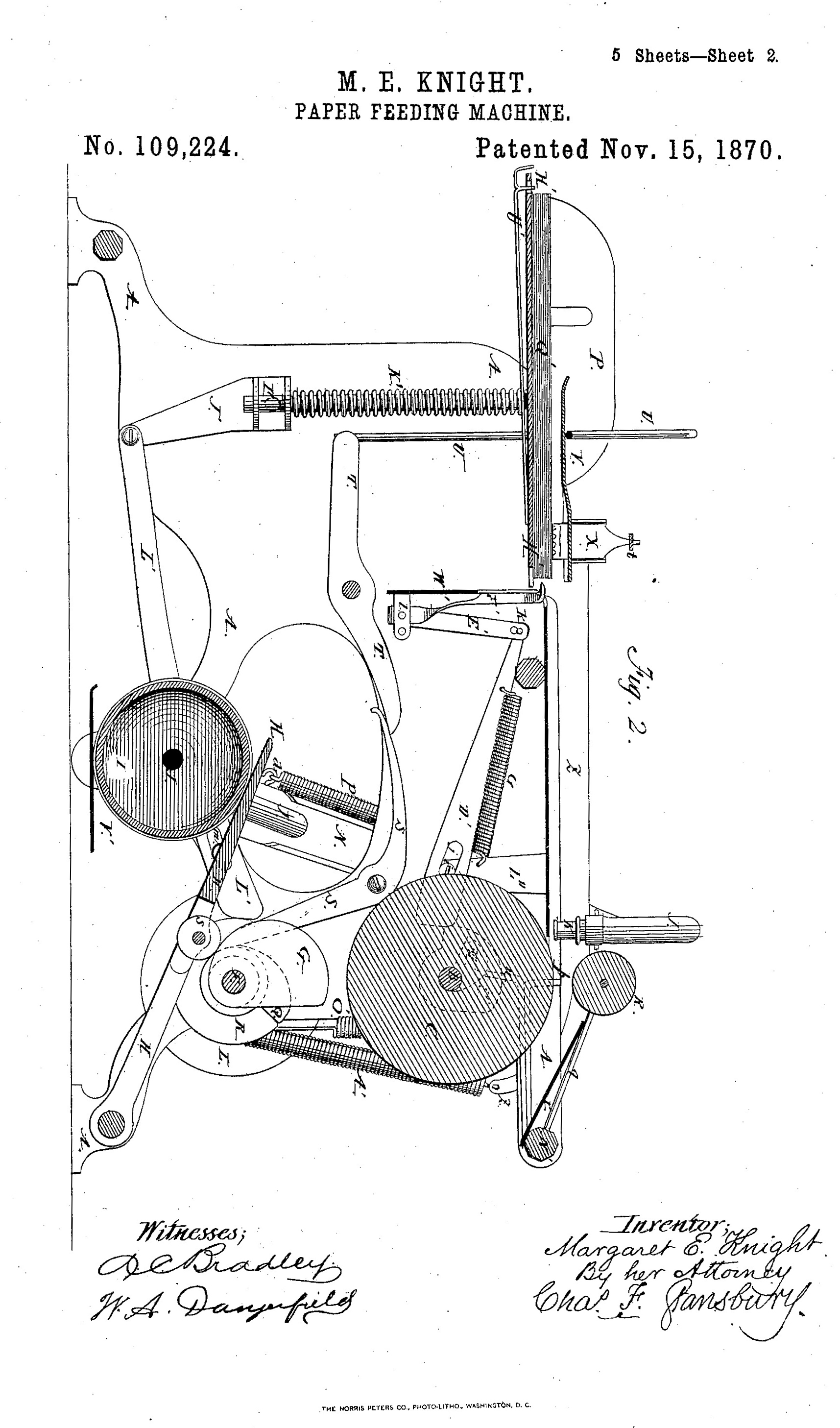
Improvement in paper feeding machines, 1870

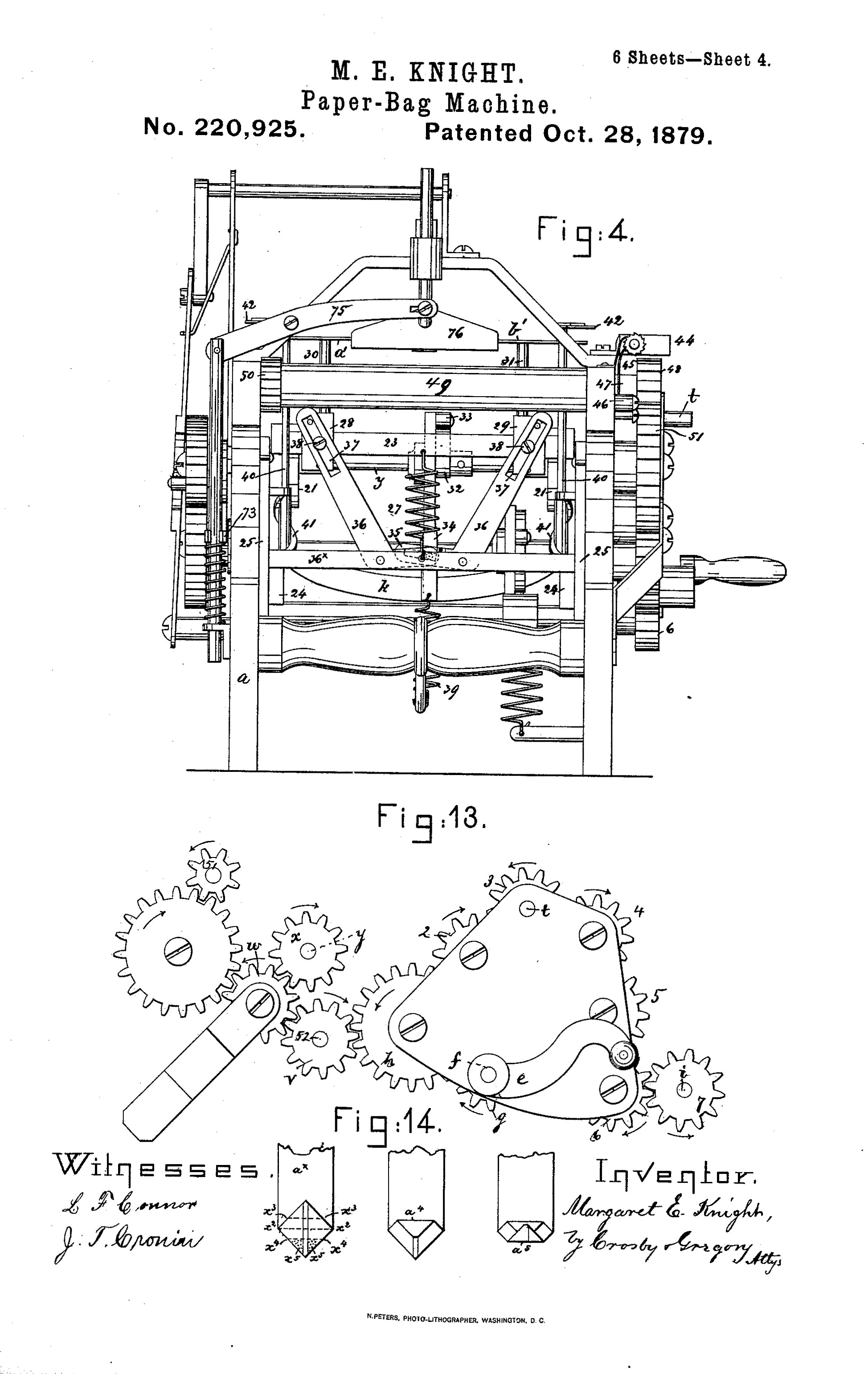
Improvement in paper-bag machine, 1879

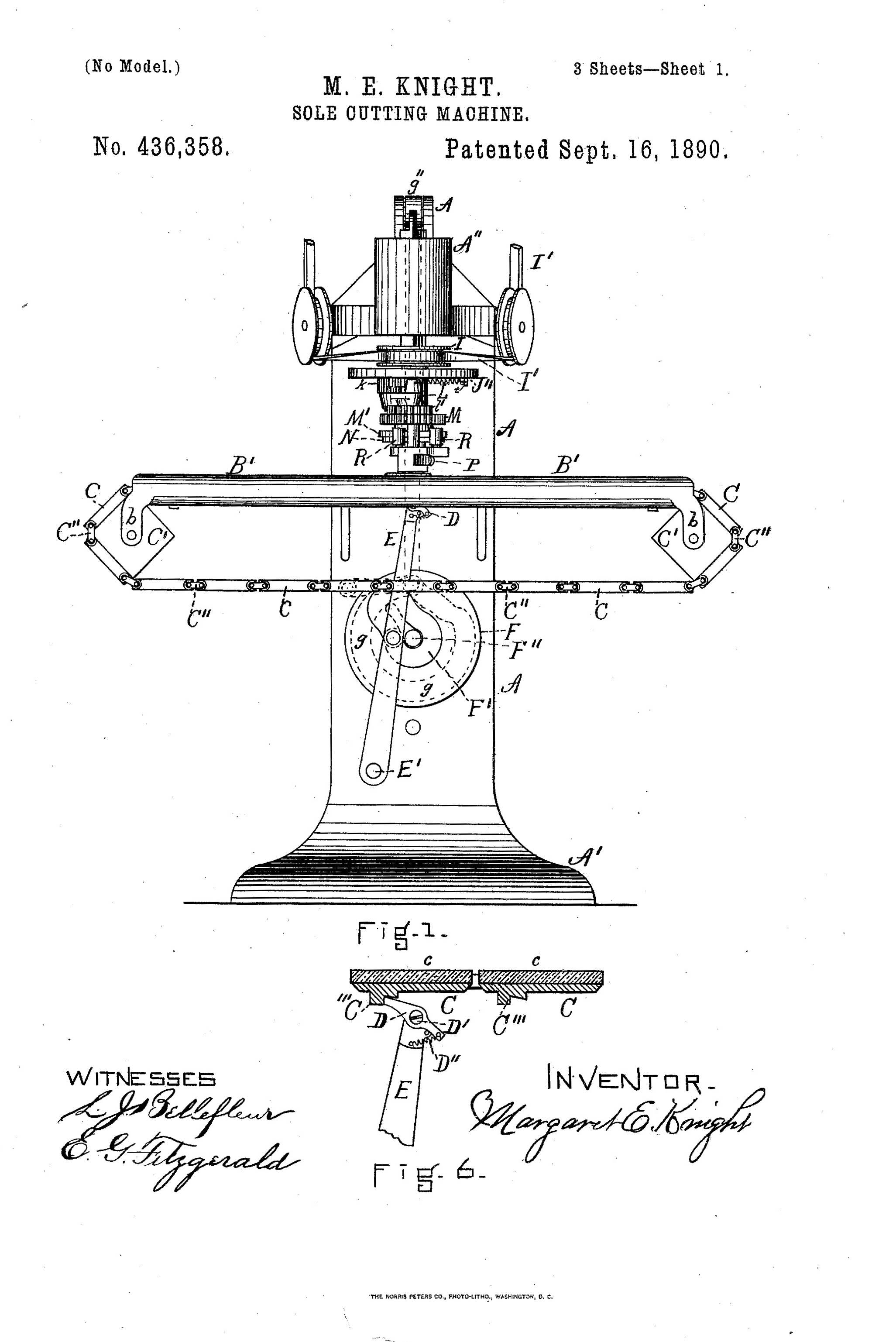
Sole cutting machine, 1890

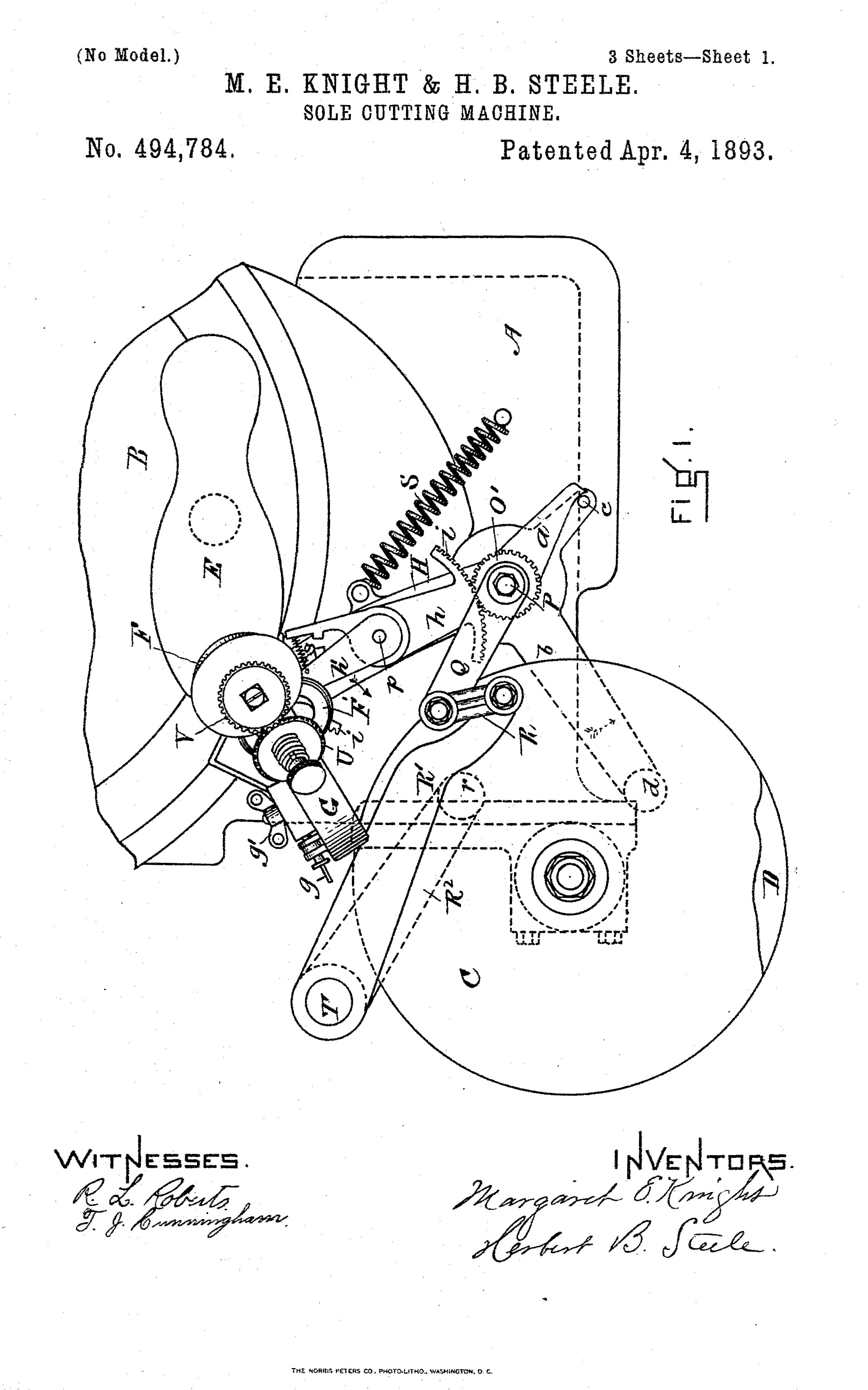
Sole cutting machine, 1893

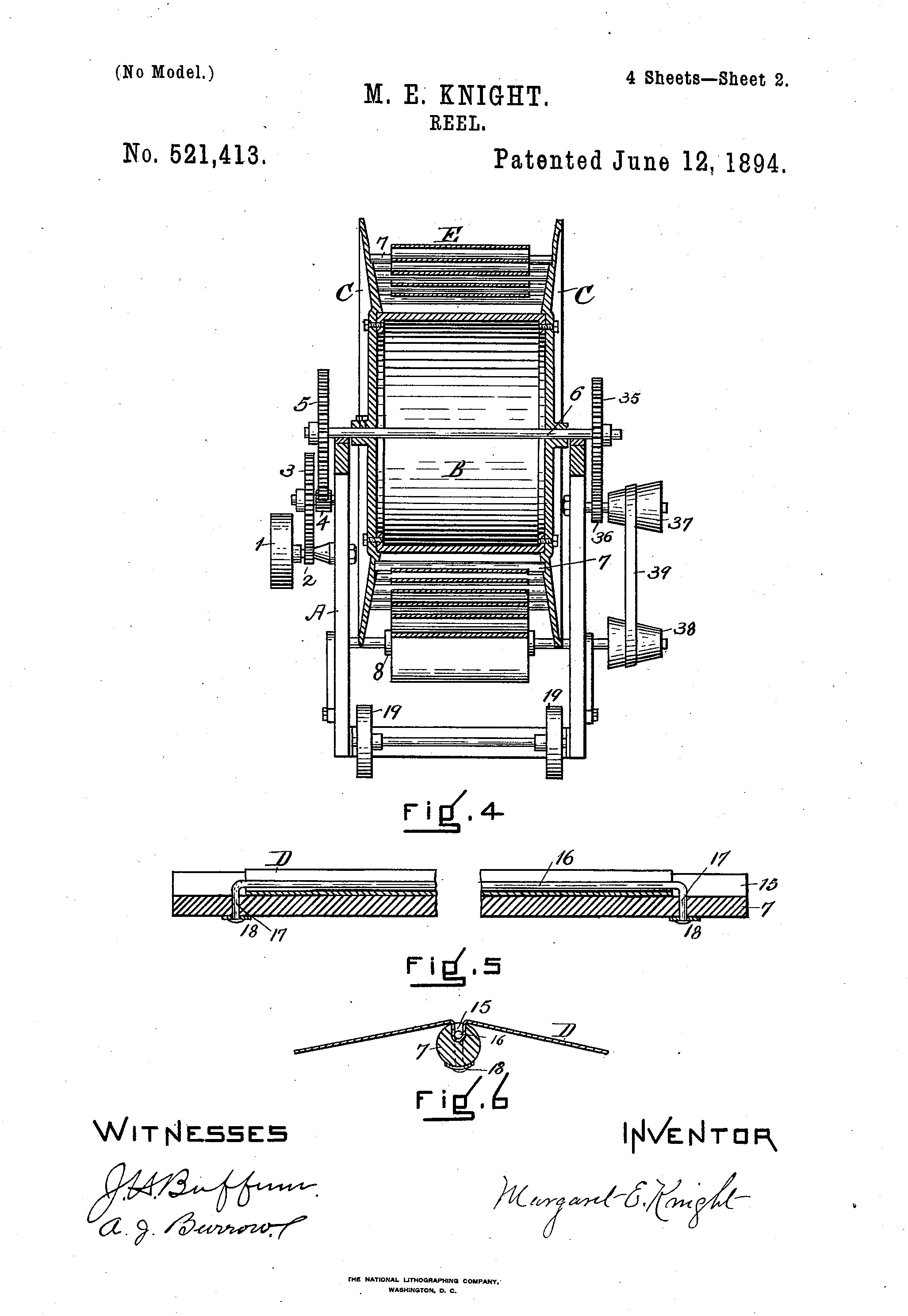
Reel, 1894

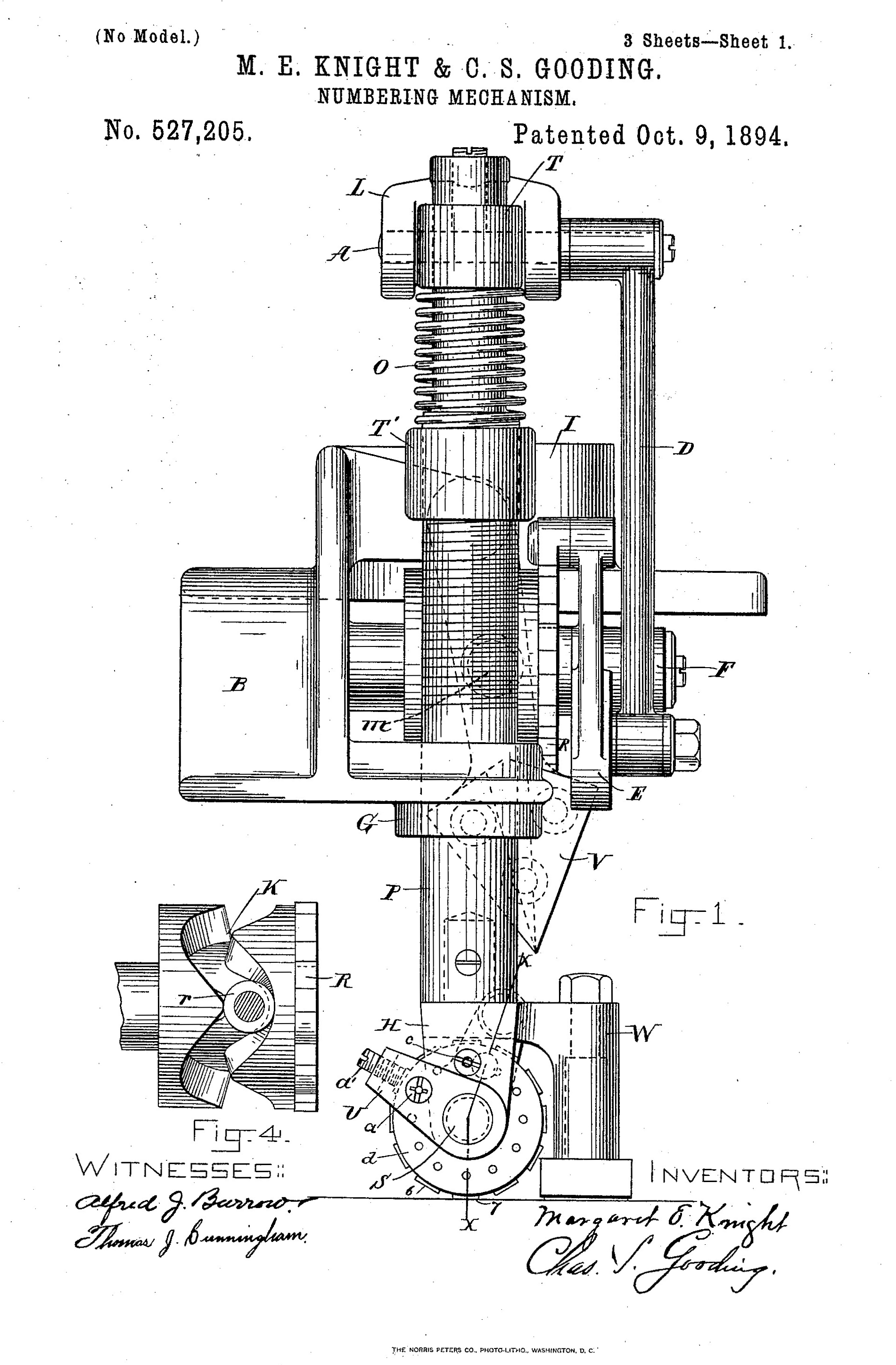
Numbering mechanism, 1894

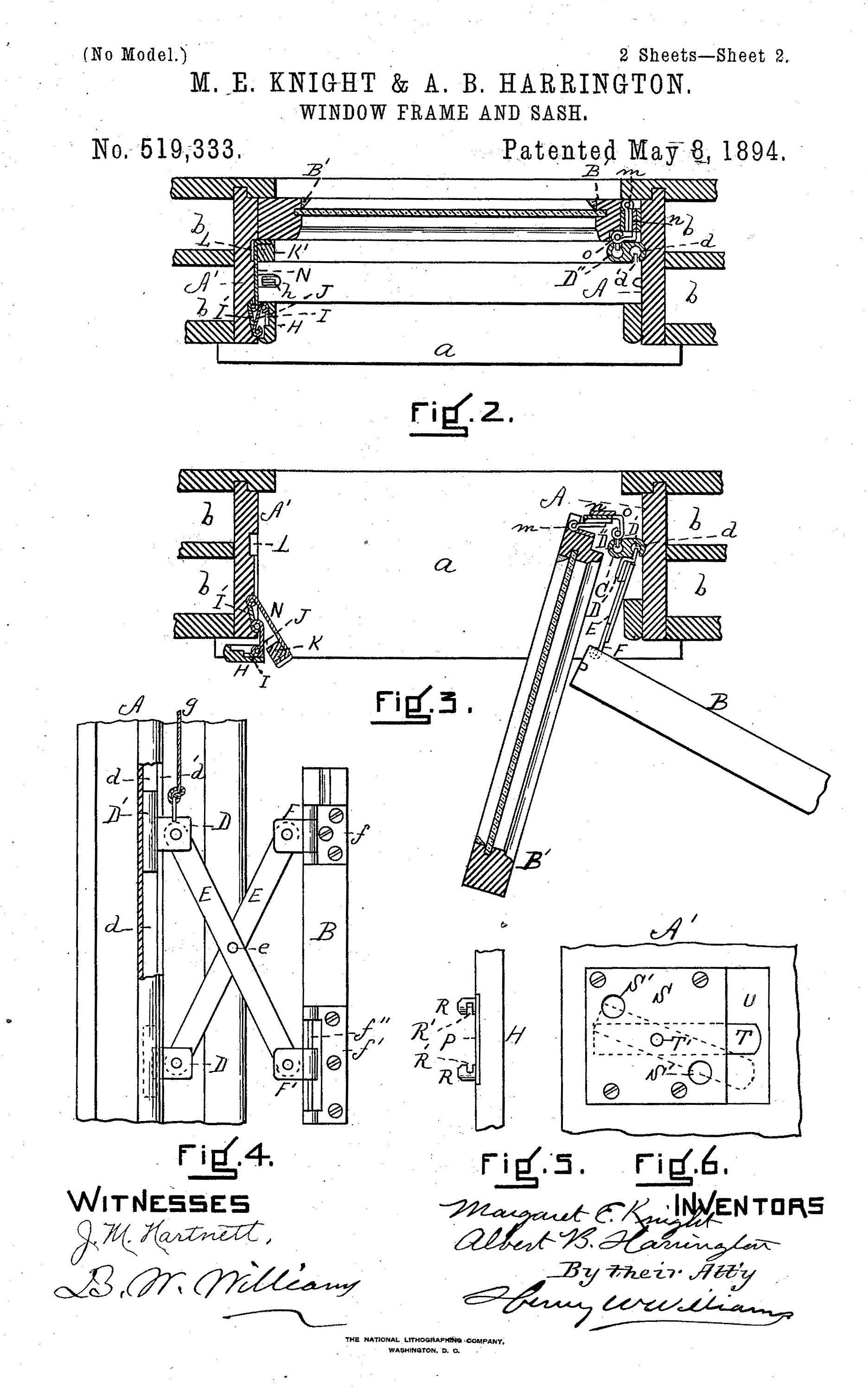
Window frame with sash, 1894

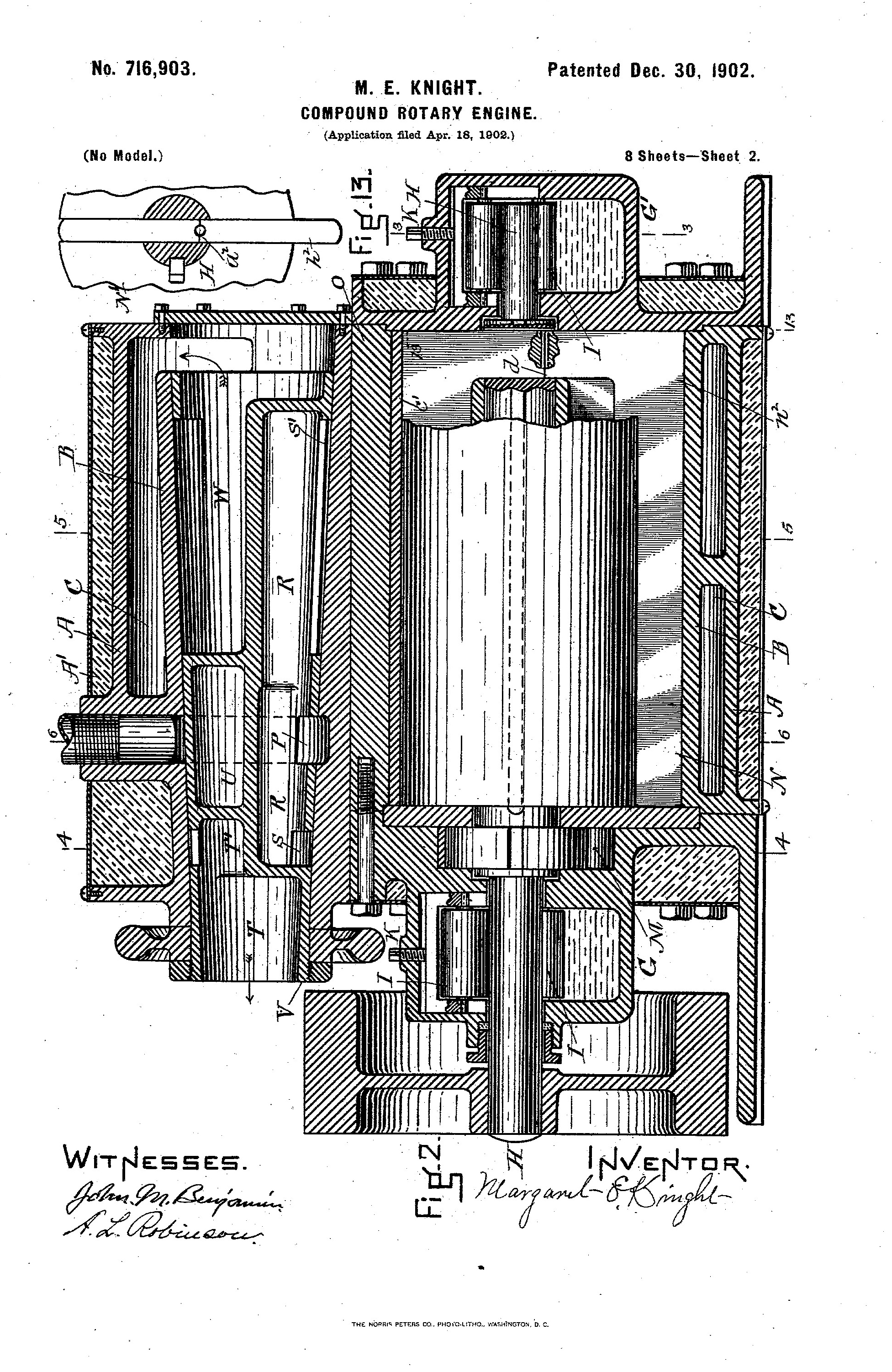
Compound rotary engine, 1902

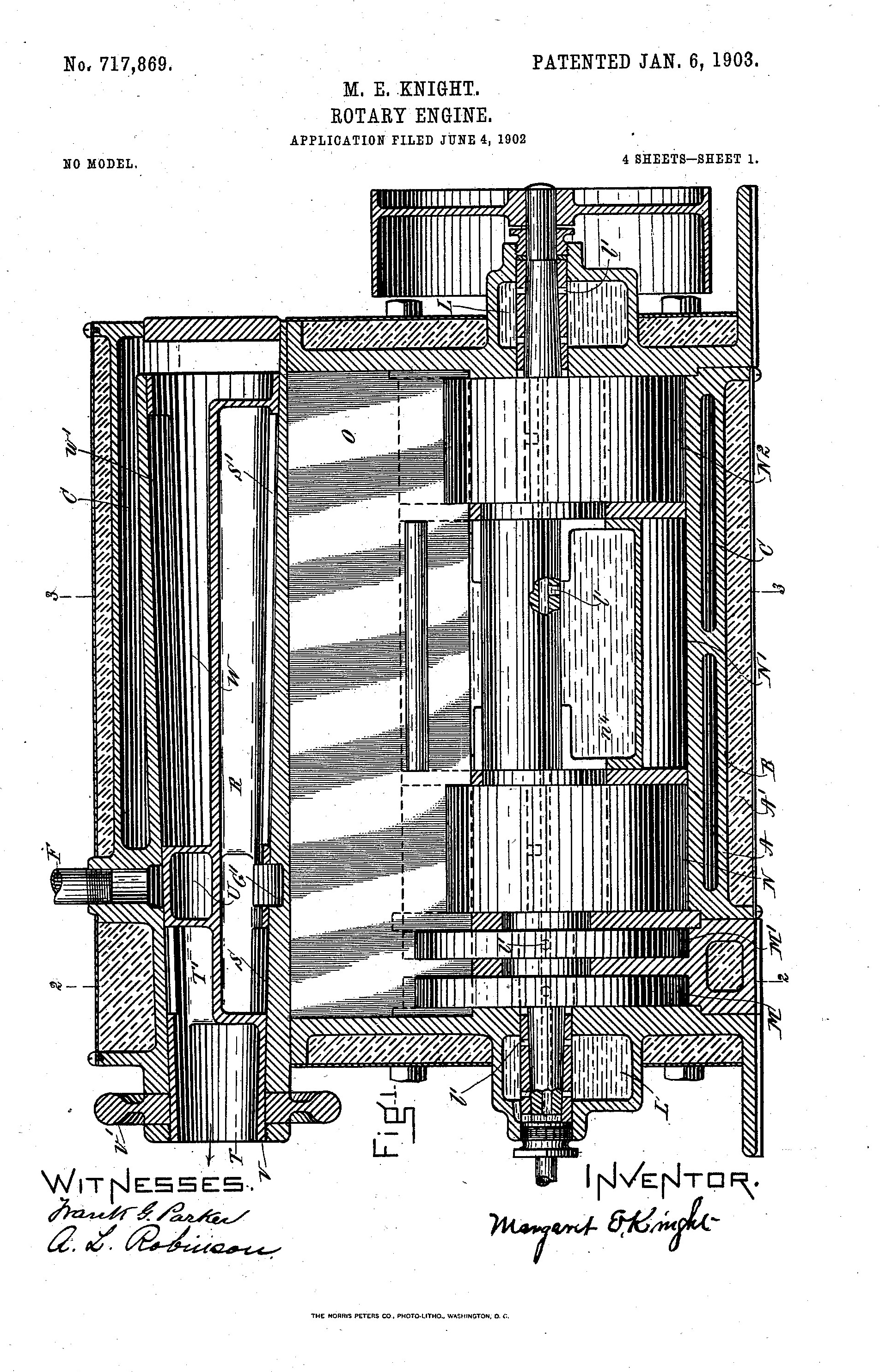
Rotary engine, 1902

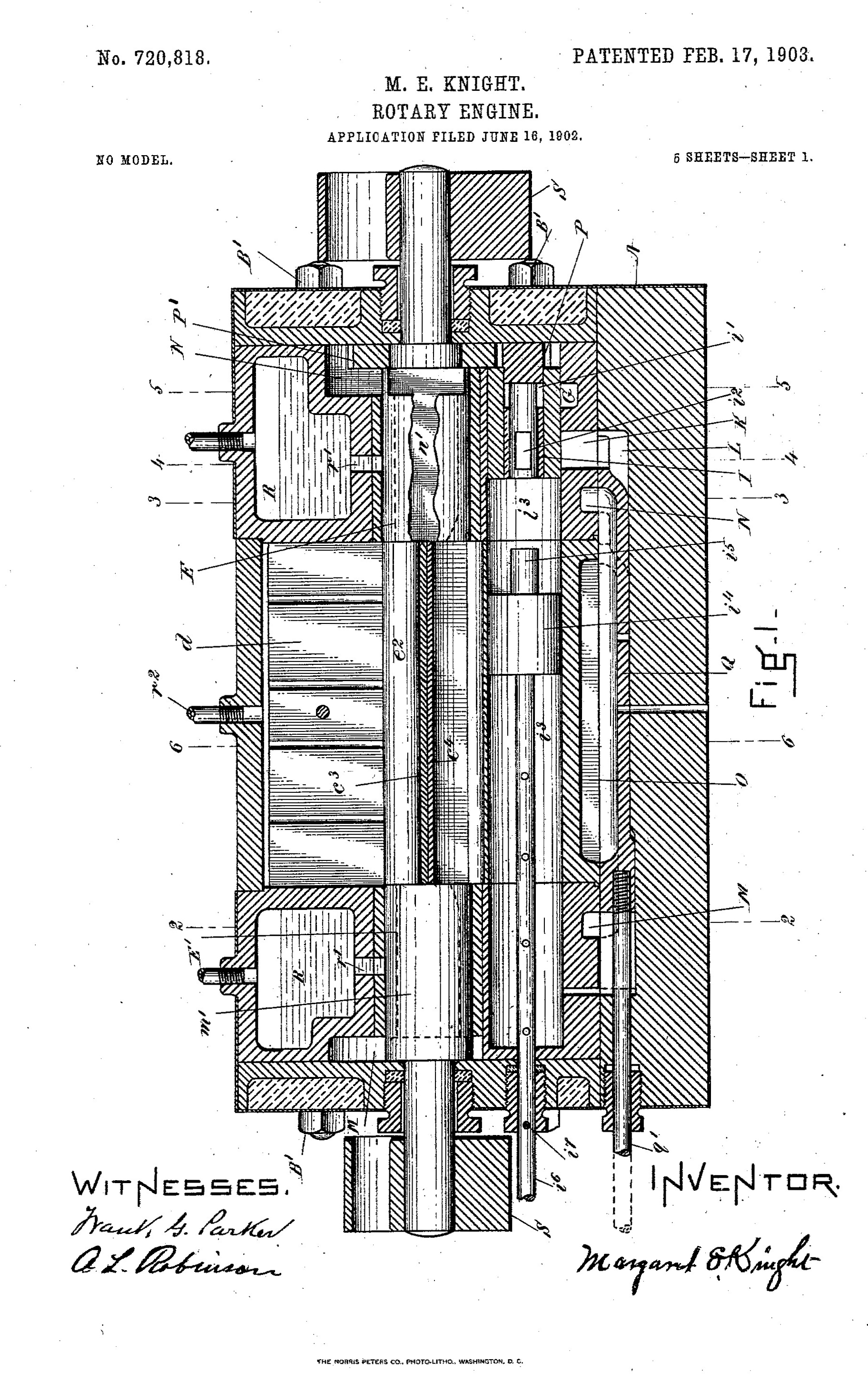
Rotary engine, 1902

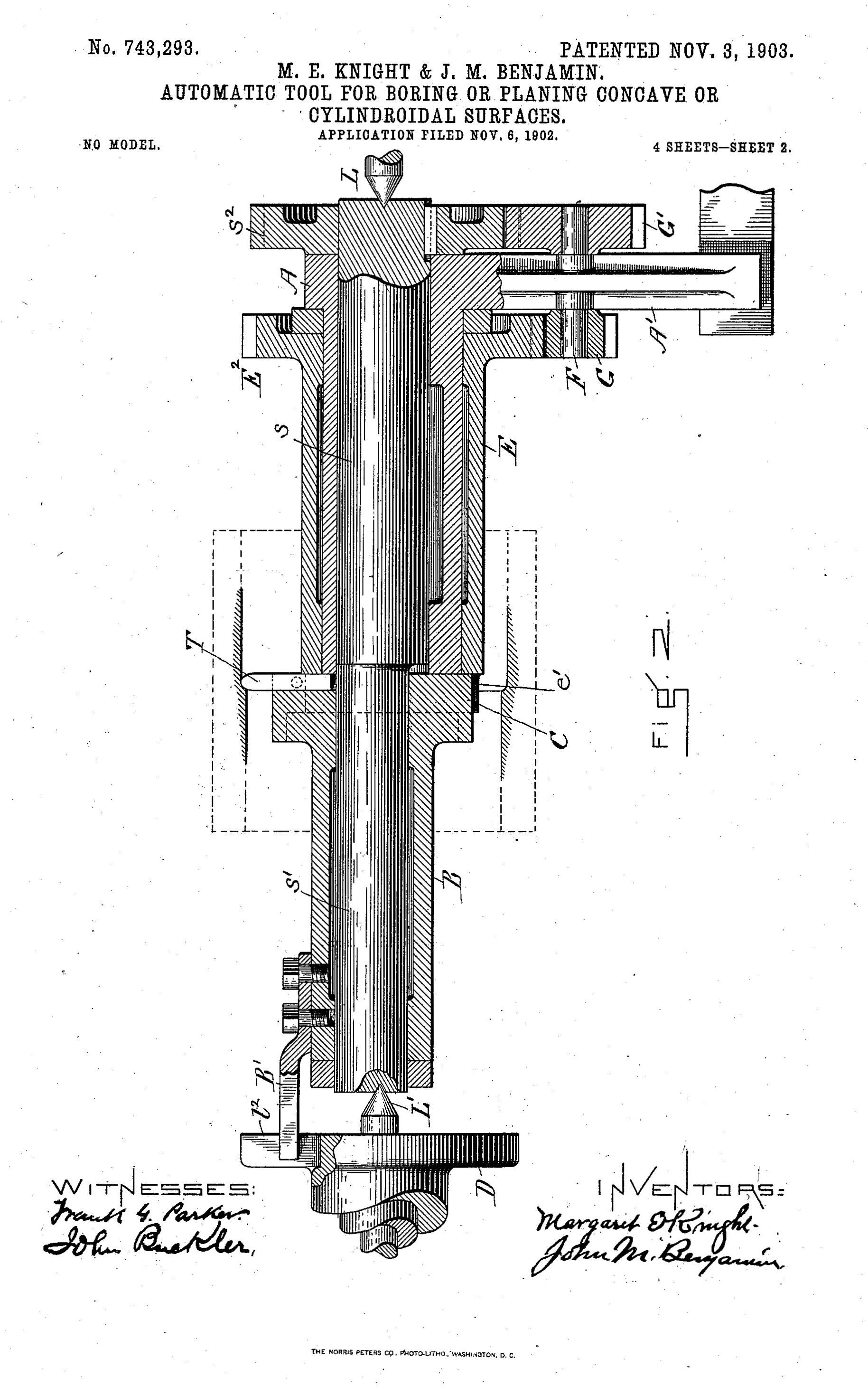
Automatic tool for boring or planing concave or cylindroidal surfaces, 1903

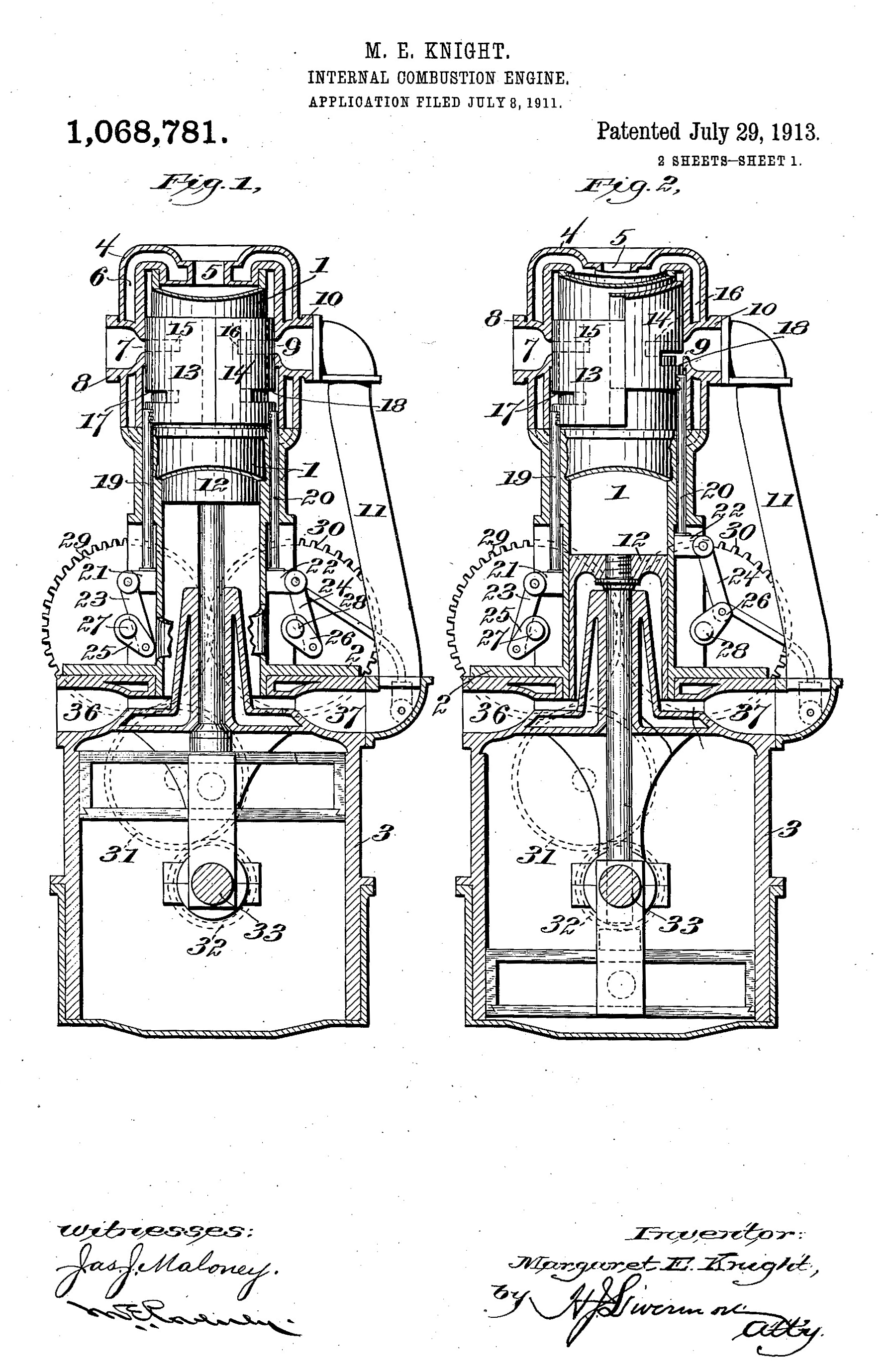
Internal combustion engine, 1913

== Works about her ==
- Lynn Ng Quezon: Mattie and the Machine: A Novel. Santa Monica Press, 2022. 264pp. ISBN 978-1-59580-118-0. (Young adult novel for ages 12+. Winner of the 2023 Grateful American Book Prize for excellence in literature about American History for grades 8-10.)
- Emily Arnold McCully: Marvelous Mattie: How Margaret E. Knight Became an Inventor. Farrar, Straus and Giroux, 2006. 32pp. ISBN 0-374-34810-3. (Children's book which was recognized as one of the "best feminist books for young readers, 2007," awarded by the Amelia Bloomer Project of the Feminist Task Force of the American Library Association.)
- DiMeo, Nate. no. 116,842 The Memory Palace Podcast Episode 78, November 5, 2015. (Podcast detailing Margaret Knight, her early life, and inventions.)
- Marilyn Bailey Ogilvie: Women in science: antiquity through the nineteenth century: a biographical dictionary with annotated bibliography. 3rd ed. MIT Press, Cambridge, MA 1991, ISBN 0-262-65038-X, p. 110 f.
- Sam Maggs: Wonder Women: 25 Innovators, Inventors, and Trailblazers who Changed History, published by Quirk Books on October 24, 2016, distributed by Penguin House. (A section detailing Knight's most notable inventions and her life.)
- Busch-Vishniac, Ilene; Busch, Lauren; Tietjen, Jill (2024). "Chapter 4. Margaret Knight". Women in the National Inventors Hall of Fame: The First 50 Years. Springer Nature. ISBN 9783031755255.

== See also ==
- Continental Paper Bag Co. v. Eastern Paper Bag Co.
- Francis Wolle

== General references ==
- Allen, Stacey L. (1999). "Knight, Margaret E. (1838-1914), inventor". American National Biography. doi:10.1093/anb/9780198606697.article.1301960. ISBN 978-0-19-860669-7.
- Famous Women Innovators. (2008). Margaret Knight Invention of the Paper Bag Machine. Retrieved from Famous Women Innovators: http://www.women-inventors.com/Margaret-Knight.asp
