= Charles Stilwell =

American inventor

Charles Stilwell was an American inventor who manufactured the paper bag.

== Biography ==
Stilwell was born and raised in Fremont, Ohio. When the Civil War broke out he joined the Union. When the conflict ended he returned to his hometown and got a job as a mechanical engineer. His hobby, which later turned into a future occupation, was the manufacturing of improved paper bag. During that time, paper and grocery bags already existed, but they were cumbersome to store and fold. Adding to it, they had a v-shaped bottom, which prevented them from standing still while someone is packing. On June 12, 1883 he got a grant on a patent to invent a machine that will manufacture a square-bottom bag, from the U.S. Patent Office. He named his invention S.O.S. or the Self-Opening Sack because of the bag's ability to remain standing and open without the person's assistance. His invention improved the paper bags for millions of people nationwide.

In 2025, the Flat-Bottomed Paper Bag was included in MoMA's Pirouette: Turning Points in Design, an exhibition featuring "widely recognized design icons [...] highlighting pivotal moments in design history."

== See also ==
- Margaret Knight – American inventor (1838–1914)
