= Leaf bag =

Grdening tools

Lawn and leaf bags are large bags specifically designed for collecting and disposing of fallen leaves, grass clippings, and other yard waste. They are typically made from paper or biodegradable materials, though some are plastic. These bags are used during yard cleanup, especially in the fall season when leaves accumulate. Many municipalities require the use of leaf bags for curbside yard waste collection because they are easy to handle and can be composted or recycled.

A survey conducted by the National Wildlife Federation, which included 1,188 people aged 18 and older living across the United States, found that 14% of respondents dispose of more than 10 bags of leaves per year, while 23% dispose of between four and six bags per year.

== Types ==
Some common types include:

- Paper leaf bags: Biodegradable and often required by local waste management services.
- Biodegradable plastic bags: Designed to break down more easily than regular plastic.
- Reusable bags: Durable options for those who prefer to transport leaves to composting sites.
