= Francis Wolle =

American priest, inventor, and phycologist

Francis Wolle (December 17, 1817, in Jacobsburg, Pennsylvania – 1893, in Bethlehem, Pennsylvania) was an American priest of the Moravian Church, inventor and phycologist.

Francis Wolle invented the first bag-making machine in 1851, forming the basis for the Union Bag and Paper Company. Wolle patented his "Machine for Making Bags of Paper" in 1852. In his words, "pieces of paper of suitable length are given out from a roll of the required width, cut off from the roll and otherwise suitably cut to the required shape, folded, their edges pasted and lapped, and formed into complete and perfect bags." The machine produced 1,800 bags per hour. He patented a more elaborate machine in 1855, and a third in 1858 with a provision "for preventing the loss of the strips of paper usually cut off in order to make the bottom lap or seam of the bag." This last feature prevented those strips from jamming the machine.

Wolle's bags were folded similarly to aerograms; several tablike edges were folded over and pasted. These early bags had an envelope-shaped bottom, and could not stand upright on their own. They had to be held open while being filled, and could not easily hold bulky items such as groceries and hardware goods. James Baldwin received a British patent in 1853 for the semi-mechanised manufacture of flat-bottomed paper bags. Margaret E. Knight patented a machine in 1871 for the manufacture of flat-bottomed paper bags.

In 1892 the company relocated from Bethlehem, Pennsylvania to Hudson Falls, New York, where it had a paper mill. The Union Camp Corporation was formed by the 1956 merger of the Union Bag and Paper Company with Camp Manufacturing.

Currently his company is under the ownership of International Paper.

Wolle edited the exsiccata-like specimen series Freshwater Algae of the United States.

== Works ==
- Desmids of the United States and list of American Pediastrums, 1884
- Fresh-Water Algae of the United States (exclusive of the Diaomaceae) : complemental to Desmids of the United States, 1887
- Diatomacea of North America, 1890

== See also ==
- Margaret E. Knight
