= Hannah Slater =

Early American pioneer and inventor (1774–1812)

- Born: December 15, 1774; Smithfield, Rhode Island
- Died: October 2, 1812 (aged 37)
- Occupation: Inventor
- Known for: First American woman to receive a patent for her invention of a new method to produce cotton sewing thread
- Spouse: Samuel Slater (m. 1791; died 1812)

Hannah Slater (née Wilkinson; 1774–1812) was an early American inventor. Some sources state that she was the first American woman to receive a patent, however others state that Hazel Irwin, who received a patent for a cheese press in 1808, or Mary Kies, in 1809, was the first.

== Early life ==
Slater was born on December 15, 1774 to a Quaker family of nine; two sisters, five brothers, and parents Lydia and Oziel. Her father was a successful businessman and business partner of Moses Brown, who was in turn in business with Samuel Slater, an industrialist. Brown recommended the Wilkinson home as a suitable place for Samuel Slater to board when he arrived in the area in early 1790. At the time, Hannah was fifteen years old.

Lydia and Oziel were initially against Hannah marrying someone who was not a Quaker. However, they relented and, on October 2, 1791, Hannah and Samuel were married. In the same year, Samuel opened his own mill in the area and began to build machinery for manufacturing textiles, modeled after the machines he was familiar with in England. This mill has been preserved as a historical site and is known as the Slater Mill Historic Site.

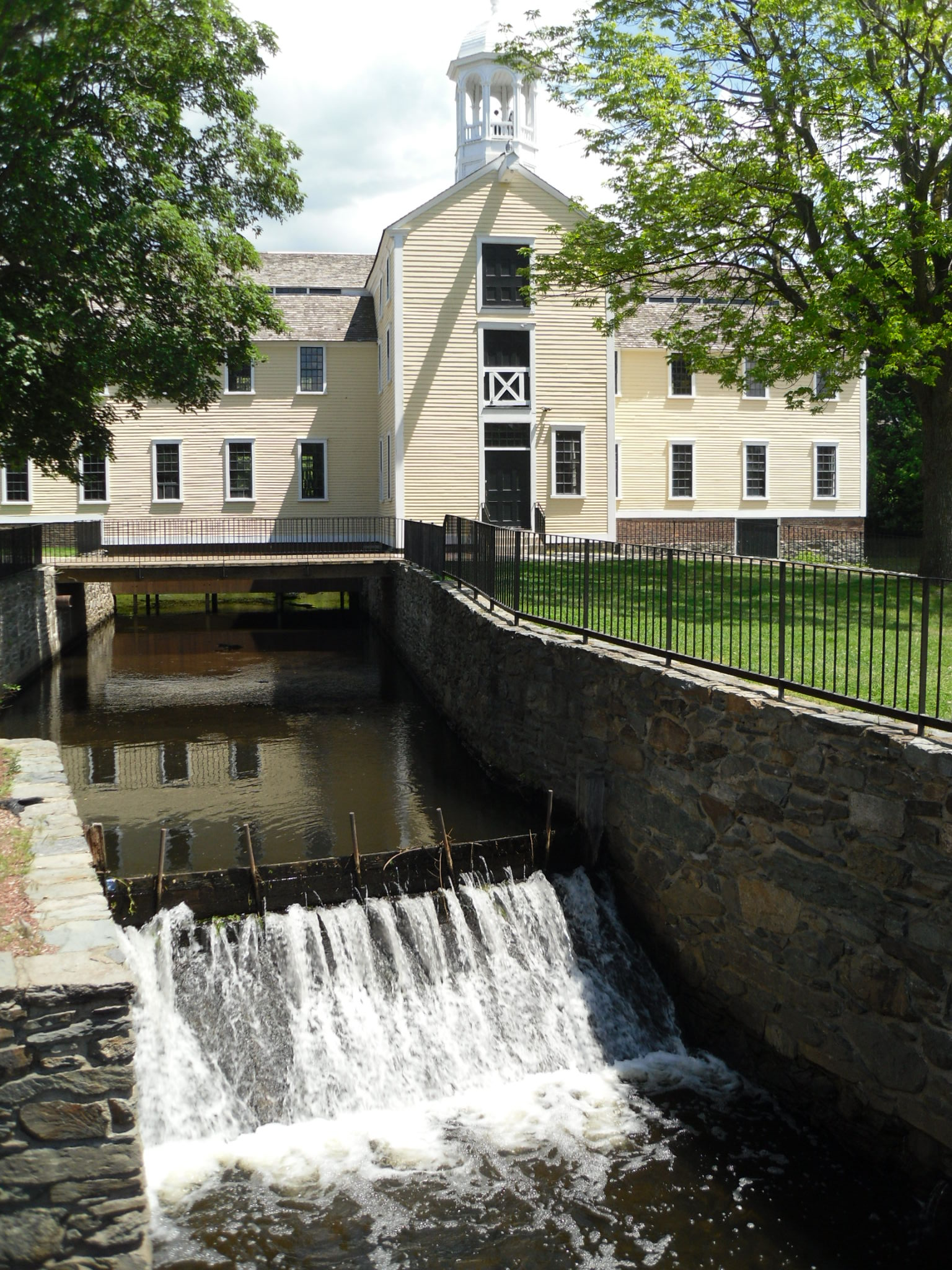
Slater Mill Historic Site, 2010

== Adult life ==
=== Invention ===
In 1793, Samuel Slater showed Hannah some very smooth yarn he had spun from long staple Surinam cotton. While Samuel intended to use this yarn to produce cloth, Hannah and her sister saw a different potential. Using a hand spinning wheel, they spun the yarn into thread, which turned out to be stronger than traditional linen thread. The same year, Hannah applied to the U.S. Patent Office for a patent for an invention - a new method of producing sewing thread from cotton. The patent was issued in the name of "Mrs. Samuel Slater".

=== Community work ===
Slater was active in religious and welfare organizations in the Pawtucket community, such as the creation of a village Sunday School, and in 1809 a Female Beneficent Society. Slater was treasurer for the society, and her sister Lydia was one of its directors.

=== Family ===
Slater gave birth to 10 children, four of whom died in infancy or childhood. The known children and their years of birth are William (b. 1796), Elizabeth (b. 1798), Mary (b. 1801), Samuel (b. 1802), George (b. 1804), John (b. 1805), Horatio (b. 1808), William (b. 1809) and Thomas (b. 1812).

Slater died on October 2, 1812, two weeks after the birth of her last child, from complications of childbirth. She was 37 years old. Her husband wrote in his memoirs that after her death "the poor lamented her, whose charities and kindness they had experienced". Slater was buried at Mineral Spring Cemetery.
