= Mary Dixon Kies =

American inventor (1752–1837)

- Born: March 21, 1752; South Killingly, Connecticut, United States
- Died: 1837 (aged 84–85); Brooklyn, New York, United States
- Resting place: Old South Killingly Cemetery, Killingly, Connecticut
- Occupation: Inventor
- Known for: First woman to receive a U.S. patent
- Spouses: Isaac Pike; John Kies
- Children: Isaac Pike II
- Awards: National Inventors Hall of Fame

Mary Dixon Kies (March 21, 1752 – 1837) was an American inventor. On May 5, 1809, her patent for a new technique of weaving straw with silk and thread to make hats was signed by President James Madison.

Some sources say she was the first woman to receive a US patent, however other sources cite Hannah Slater in 1793, or Hazel Irwin, who received a patent for a cheese press in 1808, as the first.

== Biography ==
=== Family life ===
Mary's father, John Dixon, was a farmer born in 1679 in Ulster, Ireland. Her mother, Janet Kennedy, was John Dixon's third wife. They had married in Voluntown, Connecticut on August 7, 1741.

Mary Dixon was born in Killingly, Connecticut on March 21, 1752. She married Isaac Pike I, and in 1770 they had a son, Isaac Pike II. After his death she married John Kies (1750–1813) who died on August 18, 1813, at age 63. She then lived with her second son, Daniel Kies, in Brooklyn, New York, until her death at age 85 in 1837.

=== The Hat-Making Industry ===
Mary Kies was not the first inventor of the hat, nor was she the first female to enter into the hat-making business. In 1798, Betsy Metcalf had created her own straw-braiding method. At that time, women could not even own property, let alone petition for a patent. Metcalf employed many women to make her hats, however, when she was asked why she never patented her process, she said she didn't want her name being sent to Congress. The problem that both Betsy Metcalf and Mary Kies were trying to solve was a need in the market for affordable, durable hats.

=== Invention ===
Because of the Napoleonic Wars, the United States had embargoed all trade with France and Great Britain, creating a need for American-made hats to replace European millinery. Since the United States had stopped importing European goods, the U.S. government had encouraged an increase in domestic manufacturing. The straw-weaving industry filled the gap, with over $500,000 ($4.7 million in today's money) worth of straw bonnets produced in Massachusetts alone in 1810.

Mary Kies received her patent on May 5, 1809, for a new technique of weaving straw with silk and thread to make hats.

The hats produced with this technique were sturdier than others, because Kies’ method of using silk instead of straws in the seam held the cross-hatching together. Also, the hat-making method she introduced was highly cost-effective; thus, a lot of businesses in the hat-manufacturing market adopted it. Manufacturers kept producing Kies' method, even after her patent was burned in the fire of the Patent Office in 1836.

Thanks to Kies invention, the hat industry thrived, even during the War of 1812. However, Kies made very little profit from her sales. Kies had hoped to profit from her invention, however, after the death of her husband John Kies, she moved in with her son Daniel Kies. He tried to help through investing, but Kies ultimately died penniless due to changes in fashion trends which made her invention obsolete.

=== Impact ===
Even though Mary Kies invention itself did not have a lasting impact, her legacy is one that opened doors for future generations of female inventors.

Mary Kies was one of the first women to receive a U.S. patent, despite the controversy if she was actually the first. Up until 1790, women weren't even able to apply for and receive a U.S. patent and it wasn't until the Patent Act of 1790 that women could receive a patent. The Patent Act stated that "any person or persons" could apply for a patent. It is also thought that the first woman to receive a U.S. Patent was Hannah Wilkinson Slater, as she was issued a patent in 1793. However, the patent was issued to “Mrs. Samuel Slater,” rather than Hannah, causing people to believe that Mary Kies was the first female to receive a patent.

Regardless, Mary Kies was essential in paving the way for other women to even be able to receive a patent. Her legacy was recognized by Killingly Grange No. 112, after the members learned that Mary Kies died with little to her name and her grave was marked with an uninscribed headstone. The group took to honoring her with a new headstone in Old South Killingly cemetery as the first woman in the United States to apply for and receive a patent.

Mary Kies was also inducted into the National Inventors Hall of Fame in 2006 for her achievement. The National Inventors Hall of Fame praises her for her process for weaving straw with silk or thread and for being the first woman to apply for and receive a patent, specifically in her own name.

Today, over twelve percent of all patent applications include a woman inventor. This number has steadily grown since 1840 when there were approximately 20 U.S. patents issued to women for inventions that were mostly related to cooking, tools, and clothing.

=== Recognition ===
Dolley Madison sent a letter praising Kies for her invention. In 1802, the first official U.S. Patent Office was established, making Mary Kies invention especially timely, as the United States was attempting to maintain neutrality and had stopped importing European goods. This is believed to be the reason for Madison's letter, as Kies invention contributed to both the hat industry and benefitted the United States government.

=== Further reading ===
- Busch-Vishniac, Ilene; Busch, Lauren; Tietjen, Jill (2024). "Chapter 2. Mary Dixon Kies". Women in the National Inventors Hall of Fame: The First 50 Years. Springer Nature. ISBN 9783031755255.
