= Cheese press =

Culinary device

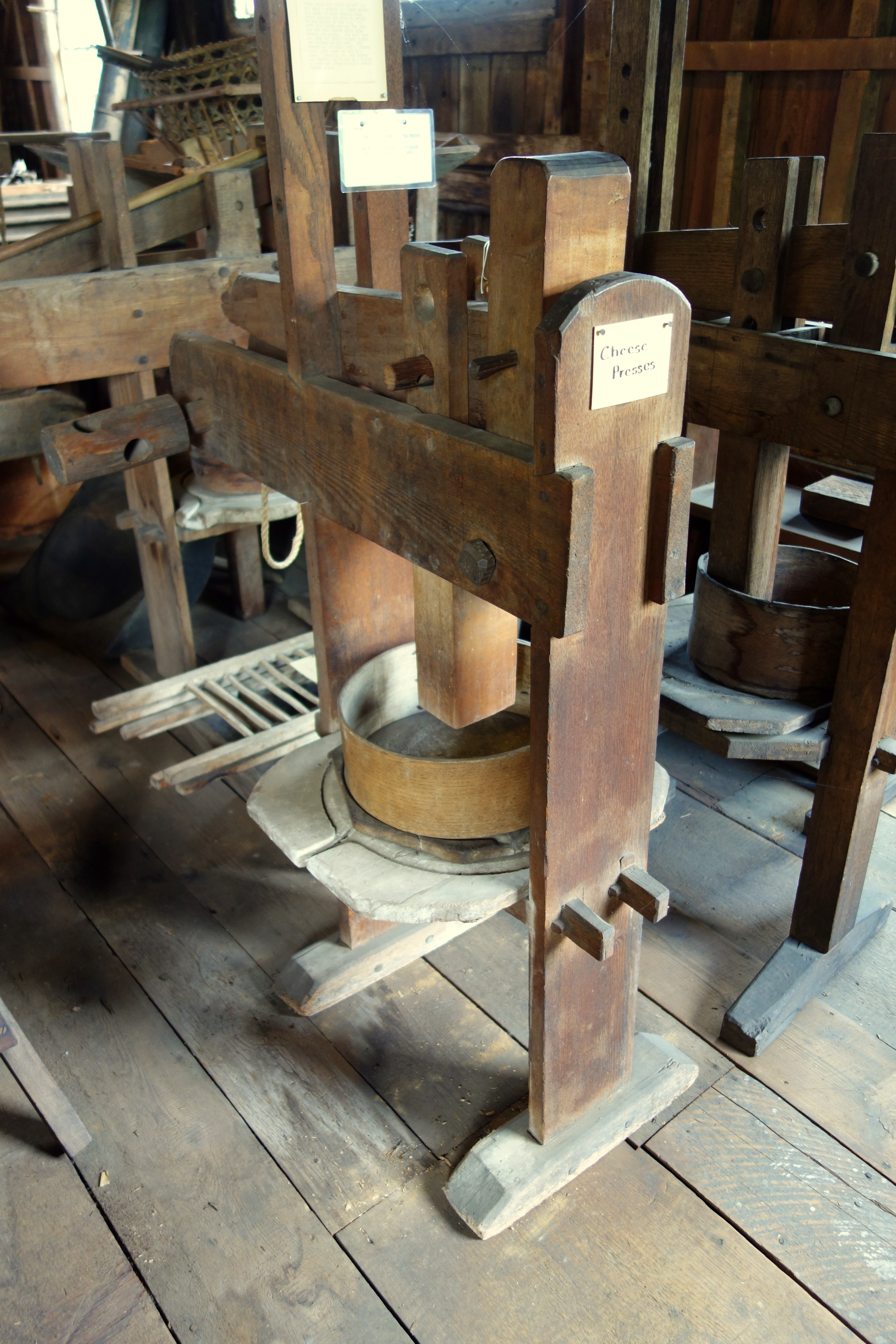
A cheese press at the Hadley Farm Museum in Hadley, Massachusetts

A cheese press is a device for pressing whey from curds when making cheese. Pressing influences the cheese's hardness and texture and will also determine the shape of the block or wheel of cheese.

Some sources state that Hazel Irwin, who received a patent for a cheese press in 1808, was the first American woman to receive a patent, although others state that Hannah Slater in 1793, or Mary Kies, in 1809, was the first.
