= Paper bag =

Flexible container made of paper

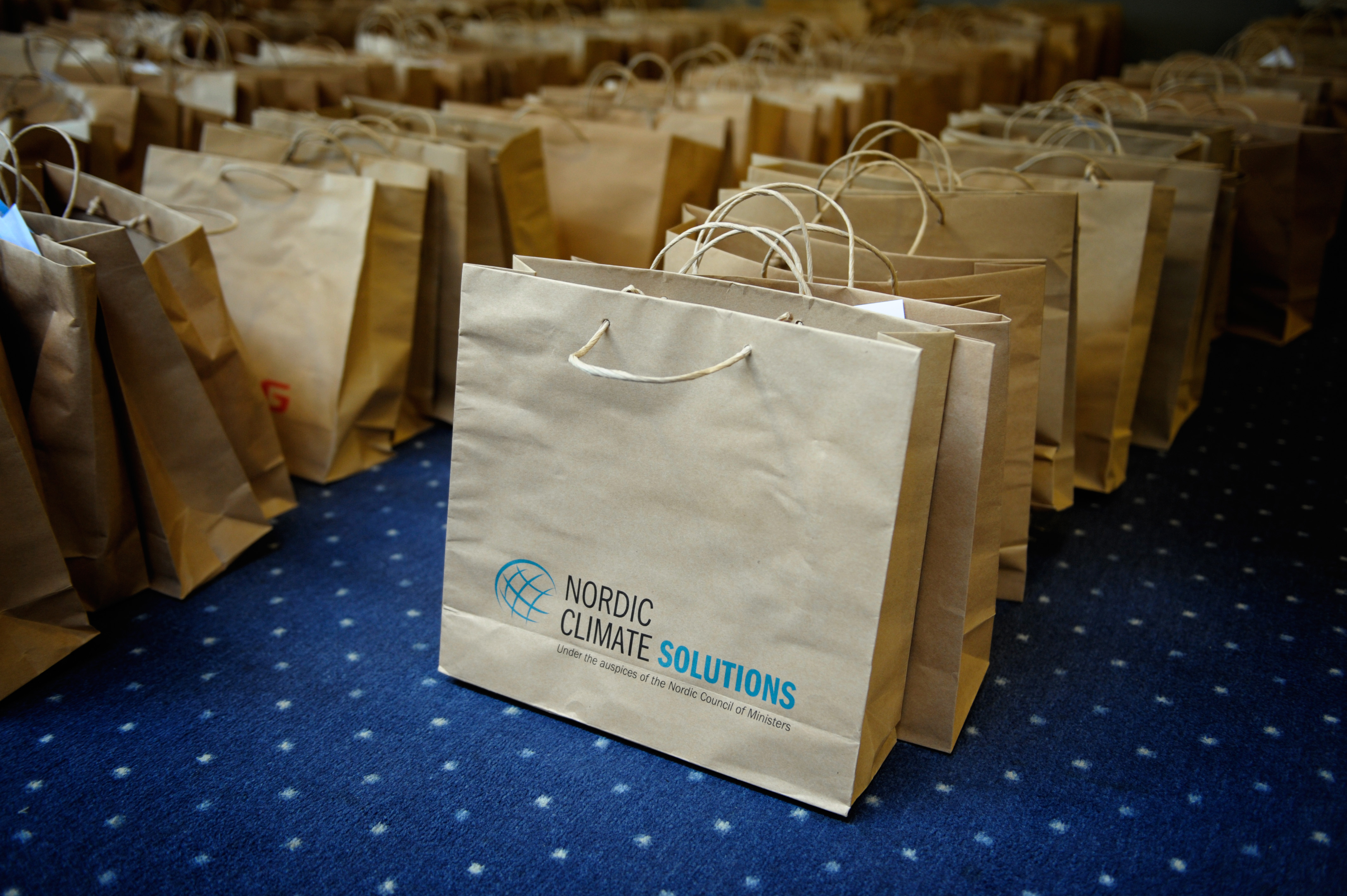
Kraft paper bags

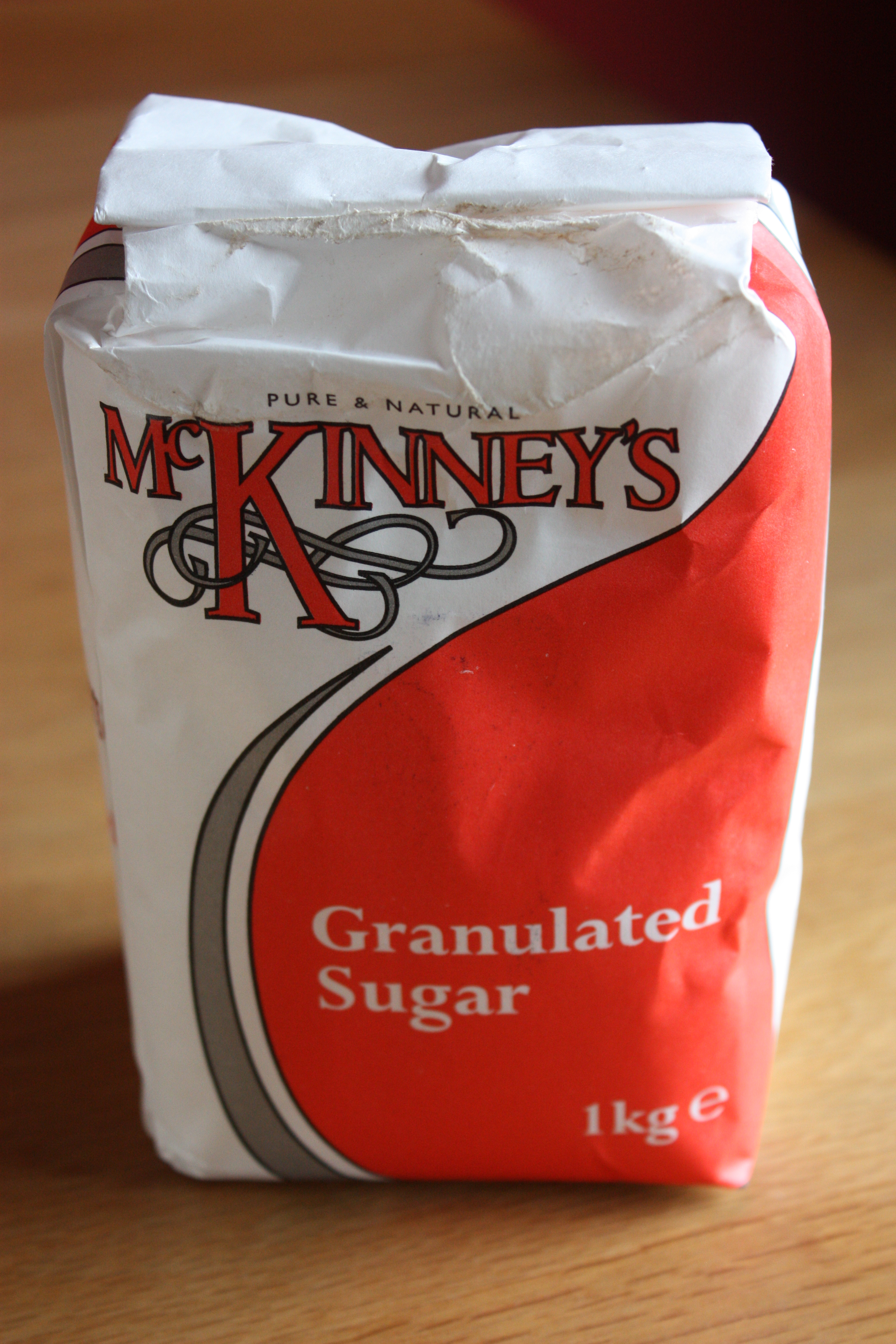
Bag of sugar

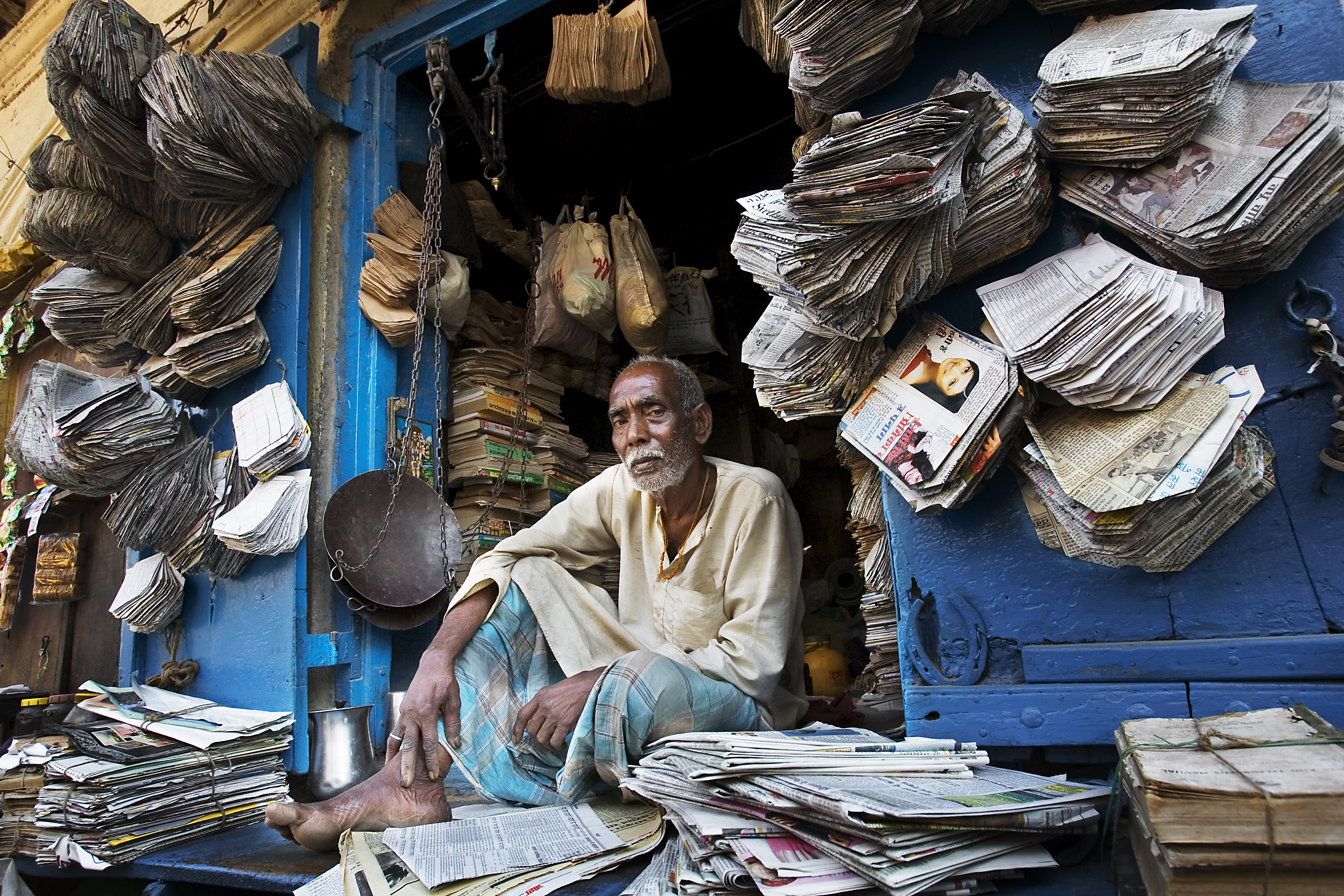
Traditional paper bags made from reused newspaper in India.

A paper bag is a bag made of paper, usually kraft paper. Paper bags can be made either with virgin or recycled fibres to meet customers' demands. Paper bags are commonly used as shopping carrier bags and for packaging of some consumer goods. They carry a wide range of products from groceries, glass bottles, clothing, books, toiletries, electronics and various other goods and can also function as means of transport in day-to-day activities.

Paper bags were first mass produced in 1852 following their invention by Pennsylvania schoolteacher Francis Wolle. Wolle and his brother obtained a patent for the machine that made the bags and soon after founded the Union Paper Bag Company. Square-bottomed bags were soon made afterwards by the English papermaker James Baldwin, who designed an apparatus to made the flat-bottomed bags. Further developments in the size, design, and ease of use for paper bags occurred throughout the 19th century, though bags with carrying handles were only popularized in the 1910s. Plastic bags were introduced in the 1970s and over time replaced paper bags in many stores, though a trend towards lightweight plastic bag bans would cause paper bags to be re-introduced in many places.

Though they take many shapes and can be made from different materials, the paper bag is most often made with a single layer of paper protecting its contents from the outside environment. Bags used in different applications, such as packaging for food, fertilizer, or other dry materials like cement are subject to different quality standards and safety requirements and may be multi-walled or otherwise reinforced. A bag will often indicate its carrying capacity in weight or volume based on performance tests. Some paper bags may be laminated, often with polyethylene, to offer a greater level of protection from moisture and bacteria. As most paper bags are made from fibres extracted from wood, they biodegrade readily and do not have the same ecological footprint as plastic bags.

The term "brown bag" often refers to two specific uses of a paper bag: carrying food prepared at home as a packed lunch, and concealing the label of an alcoholic beverage while in a public area. The former use is often associated with schoolchildren and the working class in the United States, while the latter has been the subject of legislation.

== History ==
The first machine to mass produce paper bags was invented in 1852 by Francis Wolle, a Pennsylvania schoolteacher. Wolle and his brother patented the machine and founded the Union Paper Bag Company.

In 1853, James Baldwin, papermaker of Birmingham and Kings Norton in England, was granted a patent for apparatus to make square-bottomed paper bags. Thereafter he used an image of a flat-bottomed bag as his business logo.

In 1871, inventor Margaret E. Knight designed a machine that could create flat-bottomed paper bags, which could carry more than the previous envelope-style design.

In 1883, Charles Stilwell patented a machine that made square-bottom paper bags with pleated sides, making them easier to fold and store. This style of bag came to be known as the S.O.S., or "Self-Opening Sack".

In 1912, Walter Deubener, a grocer in Saint Paul, Minnesota, used cord to reinforce paper bags and add carrying handles. These "Deubener Shopping Bags" could carry up to 75 pounds (34 kg) at a time, and became quite popular, selling over a million bags a year by 1915. Paper bags with handles later became the standard for department stores, and were often printed with the store's logo or brand colors.

Plastic bags were introduced in the 1970s, and thanks to their lower cost, eventually replaced paper bags as the bag of choice for grocery stores. With the trend towards phasing out lightweight plastic bags, though, some grocers and shoppers have switched back to paper bags.

In 2015, the world's largest paper shopping bag was made in the UK by Paper Bag Co and recorded by Guinness World Records. Also in 2015: The European Union adopted directive (EU) 2015/720, that requires a reduction in the consumption of single use plastic bags per person to 90 by 2019 and to 40 by 2025.

In 2018, the “European Paper Bag Day” was established by the platform The Paper Bag, an association of the leading European kraft paper manufacturers and producers of paper bags. The annual action day takes place on 18 October and aims to raise awareness among consumers about paper carrier bags as a sustainable packaging solution. It was launched to encourage more people to act responsibly and use, reuse and recycle paper bags. With different activities on local level, the association wants to open a dialogue with consumers and give them revealing insights about paper packaging.

In April 2019, the European Union adopted Directive (EU) 2019/904 of the European Parliament and of the Council of 5 June 2019 on the reduction of the impact of certain plastic products on the environment.

== Paper sack ==
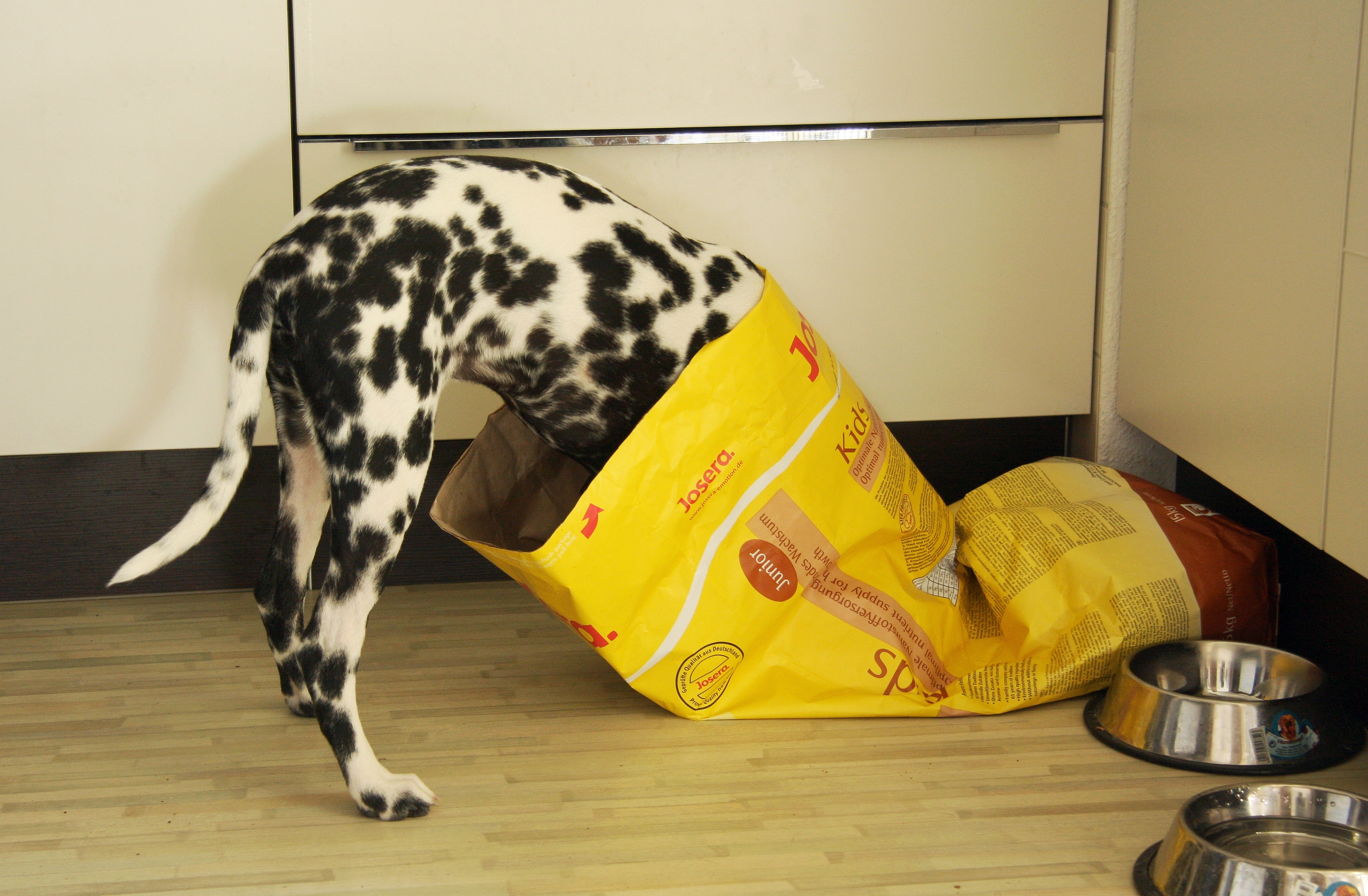
A multiwall bag of dog food

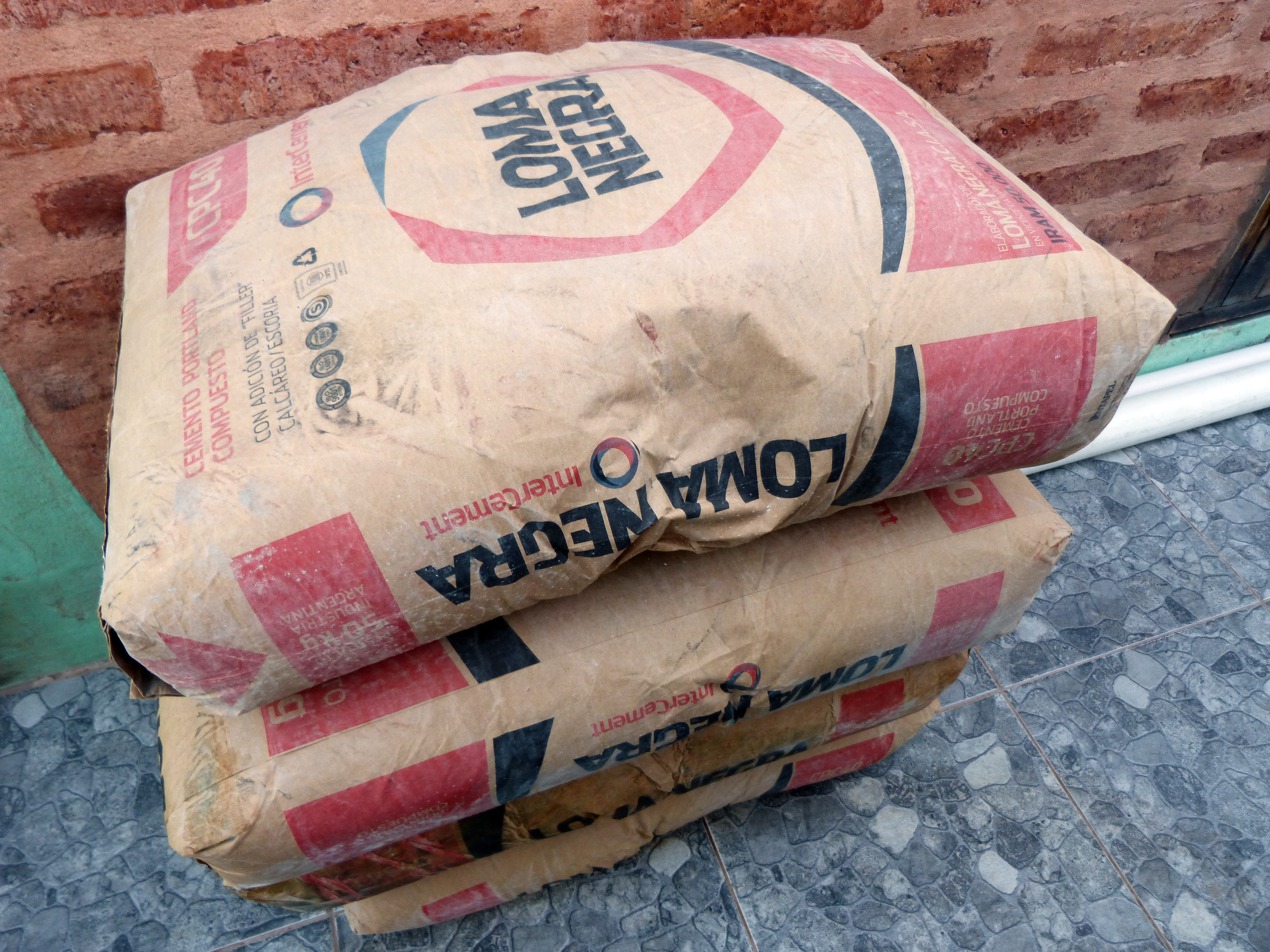
Paper sacks containing cement

A paper sack is a type of paper bag that can be constructed of one or several layers of high quality kraft paper, usually produced from virgin fibre. Paper sacks can also be referred to as industrial paper bags, industrial paper sacks, shipping sacks or multi-wall paper bags or sacks. They are often used for packaging and transporting dry powdery and granulated materials such as fertilizer, animal feed, sand, dry chemicals, flour and cement. Many have several layers of sack papers, printed external layer and inner plies. Some paper sacks have a plastic film, foil, or polyethylene coated paper layer in between as a water-repellant, insect resistant, or rodent barrier.

Multi-wall paper sacks are designed to provide strong product protection, with high elasticity and high tear resistance, for products with high demands for safety and durability. Information such as instructions, logos or trademarks can be printed on the resistant outer surface. Plastic films or different dispersions are sometimes used as inner layers or coatings to provide a barrier against moisture, water vapour, grease, oxygen, odours and bacteria. Paper sacks are produced on paper sack converting machines consisting of tuber and a bottomer.

There are two basic designs of bags: open-mouth bags and valve bags. An open-mouth bag is a tube of paper plies with the bottom end sealed. The bag is filled through the open mouth and then closed by stitching, adhesive, or tape. Valve sacks have both ends closed and are filled through a valve. A typical example of a valve bag is the cement sack.

=== Properties ===
Paper sacks are usually made of Kraft paper, which has the advantage of being soft and strong at the same time. The stretch or elongation increases the energy required to break the material. They can carry and protect products up to 50 kg, and adapt easily to the nature of their contents and to handling constraints. Depending on the product, the weight ratio of a paper sack to its contents can be up to 1:250. The strength is due to the arrangement of the fresh fibres used in kraft paper production. The bonding together of the fibres during production improves not only the strength, porosity and elasticity, but also the tear-resistance.

One of the natural and unique characteristics of sack kraft paper is its porosity. Acting as a filter material, high-porosity paper enables the air used in the filling process for dry powdery goods to escape very quickly, without the need for air extraction systems. This makes it possible to achieve filling speeds of up to 3.5 sec for a 25 kg sack.

Thanks to different paper sack constructions with glue, barrier, layer or surface concepts, paper sacks can also be moisture resistant. All moisture-proof sacks are compatible with regular paper sack filling machines. In especially adverse weather conditions, an extremely thin bioplastic, plastic or other adequate barrier film can be part of the surface layer in the paper sack construction for particularly effective protection.

Added barrier film liners can also extend the shelf life in a range of different conditions. There are many different sack constructions especially designed to offer a good shelf life when paper sacks are exposed to extreme conditions such as damp, moisture, light, oxygen or carbon dioxide. Also, the correct storage and handling of paper sacks along the supply chain extends their shelf life.

Paper sacks also provide a medium for promotional messages and sophisticated printing designs. Due to their natural, non-slippery texture and their construction, paper sacks can safely be handled, stacked, palletized and stored. User-friendly opening systems, such as a tear-open flap, allow quick and clean access to the contents without the use of tools such as knives.

== Construction ==
Standard brown paper bags are made from kraft paper. Tote-style paper carrier bags, such as those often used by department stores or as gift bags, can be made from any kind of paper, and come in any color. There are two different styles of handles for paper carrier bags: flat handles and cord handles. Paper carrier bags made from virgin kraft paper are developed especially for demanding packaging. Paper bags can be made from recycled paper, with some local laws requiring bags to have a minimum percentage of post-consumer recycled content.

Paper bags can be made to withstand more pressure or weight than plastic bags do, especially when reinforced with bottom cardboard inserts that distribute dynamic loads evenly.

=== Sack paper manufacturing ===
Wood pulp for sack paper is made from softwood by the kraft process. The long fibers provides the paper its strength. Sack paper is then produced on a paper machine from the wood pulp. Both white and brown grades are made. The paper is microcrepped to give porosity and elasticity. Microcrepping is done by drying with loose draws, allowing the fibres to shrink. This is causing the paper to elongate 4% in machine direction and 10% in cross direction before busting. Machine direction elongation can be further improved by pressing between very elastic cylinders causing more microcrepping. The paper may be coated with polyethylene (PE) or different dispersions to ensure an effective barrier against moisture, grease and bacteria. A paper sack can be made of one or several layers of sack paper depending on the toughness needed.

=== Paper sack manufacturing ===
The production of paper sacks is an entirely automatic process. It is divided into two main parts: tube forming and bottom folding. The sack kraft paper used for the production is printed on its way to the tube forming. In the first step of tube forming, paper and film (if applied) can be vent-hole perforated to improve the air permeability. They are combined by glue at the cross-pasting unit afterwards and glue is then also applied at the edge of the paper layers. In the next step, paper and film are formed into a continuous tube. Individual tubes are separated by a perforating knife. After accumulating these individual tubes, they are bundled at the shingling conveyor. These bundles are transported from the tuber to the bottomer. There, at least one end of the tube is folded to a bottom that creates the paper sack. Afterwards, the paper sacks are transported to a press section, which ensures efficient paste distribution and adhesion. The production process is monitored by electronic inspection systems and machine operators.

The production process slightly varies depending on the type of sack. All paper sacks are tailor-made and cater to the specific area of usage, product type and transportation needs.

=== Sack types and sizes ===
There are many different types of paper sacks available for the various end uses. The most common sack types are valve sacks, pinch bottom sacks, SOS (self opening sacks) sacks and (pasted) open-mouth sacks.

Valve sacks have a valve for filling and sealing in a corner of the paper sack. The valve system in a corner of the sack allows high-speed filling with automatic closing when the sack is filled to its capacity. This type of sack is especially used to pack powdered goods such as cement, flour and cocoa.

The pinch bottom sack is a usually leak-proof open mouth sack, used for products such as chemicals or foodstuffs which must be protected during transport and storage.

An SOS sack has a high stability and makes quick open mouth filling easy, and can also be reclosed. SOS sacks are used for granulated products such as food products or animal feed. They have a rectangular bottom and high stability faculties and can also be used as a compost sack or refuse sack. Pasted open mouth sacks can also be SOS sacks and differentiate themselves due to their glued bottom area, which increases their strength.

Paper sacks are available in different sizes and can carry loads up to 50 kg. The capacity is variable, and paper sacks also come in a variety of calipers, basis weights, and treatments.

== Single layer ==
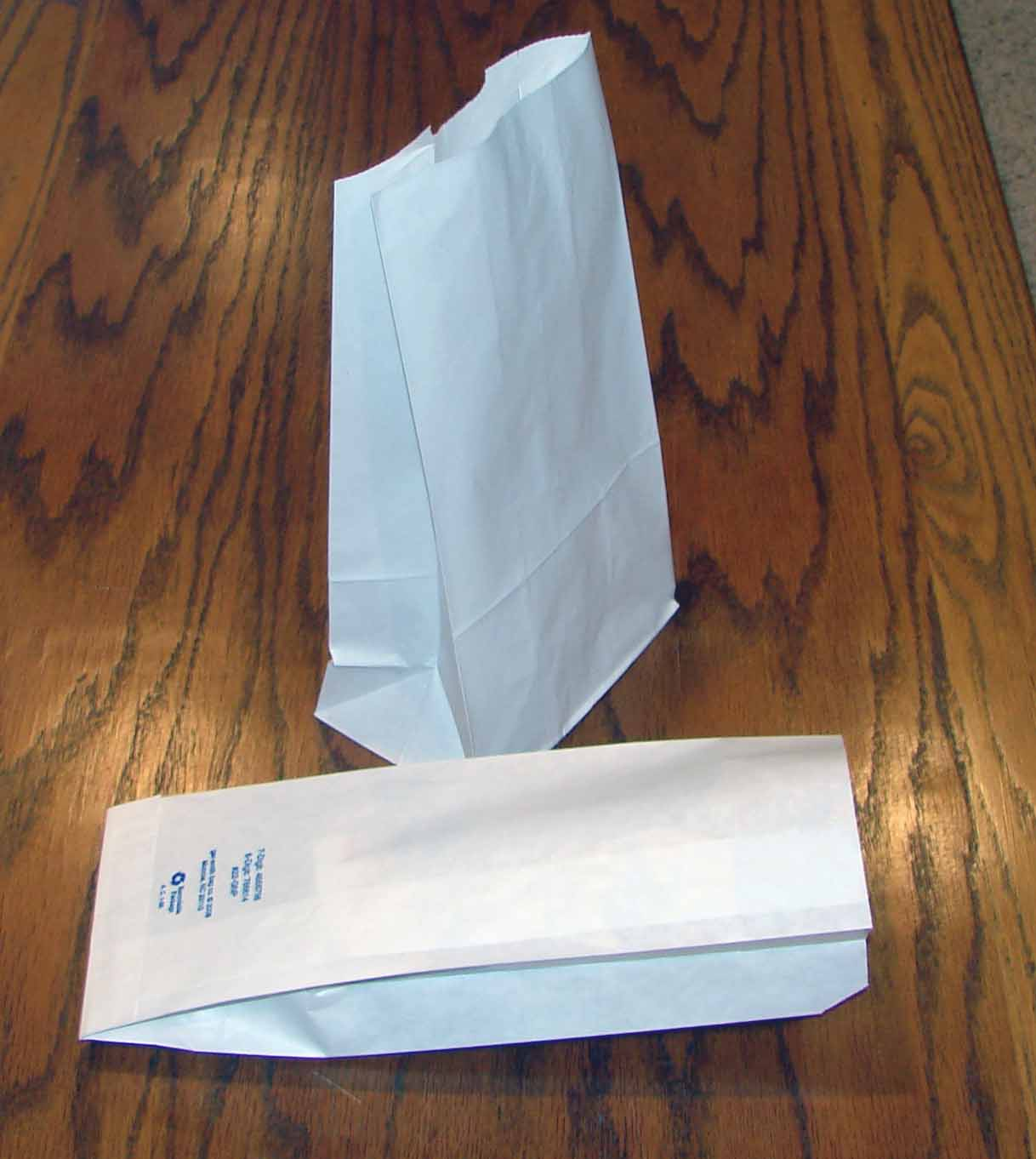
Two small paper bags – Bottom: flat gusseted bag. Top: square bottom, self-opening

Paper shopping bags, brown paper bags, grocery bags, paper bread bags and other light duty bags have a single layer of paper. A variety of constructions and designs are available. Many are printed with the names of stores and brands. Paper bags are not waterproof. In retail applications, single-layer carrier bags are typically categorized by their handle types, such as twisted paper cords or flat paper tapes. The laminated bag, whilst not totally waterproof, has a laminate that protects the outside to some degree.

== Quality standard and certification ==
Paper bag durability can be measured in accordance with the European test standard EN13590:2003. This standard is based on scientifically conducted studies and helps retailers to avoid poor-quality carrier bags. The quality certification system for paper bags is based on this standard. The test method subjects the carrier bag to heavy weights while being lifted repeatedly. The size of the paper bag is taken into account because the larger its volume, the heavier the load it must be able to carry. As a result of the certification, the paper bag is marked with the weight and volume it may carry. It is wise to choose a tested and certified paper bag.

=== Testing and assurance ===
Filled bags or sacks can be evaluated in the field by careful observation. Laboratory package testing is often conducted using drop testing, shock table testing, puncture testing, etc.

Paper sacks for food require specific quality assurance and hygiene management along the entire supply chain, as they must be in line with several national and international standards regarding the safety and hygiene of the stored food products. All materials of the sack need to be taken into account to fulfil these requirements. In Europe, there are several mandatory procedures to collect, evaluate and document all necessary information. Under certain conditions, migration testing and the issuing of compliance documents is demanded. Most of those requirements concern the conditions of use, storage time and temperature. Information on these aspects from all suppliers is a prerequisite.

== Sustainability ==
The raw material used in papermaking – cellulose fibre extracted from wood – is a renewable and natural resource. However, environmental concerns have been raised about types of wood harvesting, such as clearcutting. Due to their biodegradable characteristics, paper bags degrade in a short period of time (two to five months). When using natural water-based colours and starch-based adhesives, paper bags do not harm the environment.

Most paper bags that are produced in Europe are made from cellulose fibres that are sourced from sustainably managed European forests. They are extracted from tree thinning and from process waste from the sawn timber industry. Sustainable forest management maintains biodiversity and ecosystems and provides a habitat for wildlife, recreational areas and jobs. This sustainable forest management is proven in the FSC or PEFC certifications of paper products. Consumers can look for the FSC and PEFC labels on their paper bags to make sure they are made from sustainably sourced fibres.

As a wood product, paper continues to store carbon throughout its lifetime. This carbon sequestration time is extended when the paper is recycled, because the carbon remains in the cellulose fibres.

Paper bags can be used several times. Paper bag manufacturers recommend reusing paper carrier bags as often as possible in order to further decrease the environmental impact.

The carbon footprint of an average European paper sack is analysed since 2007. The studies have shown continuous improvement, as the carbon impact of paper sacks has been reduced by 28% in eleven years between 2007 and 2018. In 2018, the carbon footprint of an average European paper sack from cradle-to-gate is 85g CO2e per sack. If the biogenic emissions and biogenic removals were included in the analysis, it would amount to -35g CO2e per sack, which means that paper sacks have a positive impact on the environment.

== Recycling ==
Paper bags are highly biodegradable and recyclable, and hence do not pose the same environmental footprint as plastic bags do. The fibres are reused 3.6 times on average in Europe, while the world average is 2.4 times.

Plastic or water-resistant coatings or layers make recycling more difficult. Paper bag recycling is done through the re-pulping of the paper recycling and pressing into the required shapes.

== Safety ==
Compared to plastic bags, paper bags present less suffocation risk to young children or animals.

== Branding and marketing ==
Paper shopping bags can be used as a vehicle to project the brand of retailers. Paper is very tactile due to its texture and shape. Its print quality and color reproduction allow for creativity in advertising and development of the brand image. Furthermore, they achieve maximum visibility and great appreciation from customers. Using paper bags gives a signal of commitment to the environment and by using packaging made from renewable, recyclable and biodegradable sources, retailers and brand owners contribute to reducing the use of non-biodegradable shopping bags. Paper carrier bags can be a visible part of corporate social responsibility, and they are in line with a sustainable consumer lifestyle.

== Brown bag ==
While brown is the most common paper bag color (as it is the natural color of the wood fiber used to make kraft paper), the term "brown bag" (especially as a verb) refers to two specific and distinct practices:

The first form of "brown bagging" refers to bringing food from home (regardless of the actual container used) instead of buying a meal at or near one's destination. Most often, it means bringing a packed lunch to school or work. For example, a 1983 study reported that America had 60 million "brown baggers."

Individuals may choose to brown bag to save money; if options to buy food are limited or absent; or to accommodate medical, religious, or lifestyle dietary requirements (e.g. low-fat or low-salt, kosher or halal, vegetarian or vegan). Additionally, while "a substantial minority of brown baggers have access to microwave ovens or refrigerators," those who do not need to ensure their food can stay fresh until mealtime without refrigeration (possibly bringing their own, via ice packs and thermal bags), and be ready to eat without being reheated.

The noun form of the term included in the Merriam-Webster dictionary in 1950 refers to use of a paper bag instead of a lunch box. William Safire traces this to an article in Time magazine.

The second form of "brown bagging" involves drinking alcohol in places where it is not legal to do so (such as a public park, or a venue without a liquor license) while using a brown paper bag (or a black plastic bag, or other suitably opaque covering) to conceal the bottle or can. While usually an open secret that a drink handled like this almost always contains alcohol (as there's little reason to hide other drinks), depending on local laws, this can minimize the chance of legal consequences. If there is no law against generally keeping open containers in bags, then doing so does not, in and of itself, give police probable cause to search a bag for alcohol.

=== Anti-brown-bag law in New York, USA ===
In 1967, it was stated that "brown-bagging is the genteel disguise ... by a patron to furnish his own liquor when he dines at the local restaurant".

In 1985, the New York State Liquor Authority pushed for legislation (informally referred to as "the anti-brown-bag law") to prevent patrons from bringing alcoholic beverages into food establishments that do not have a liquor license. New York City Mayor Ed Koch, having been "arrested" for doing so months earlier, denounced the effort.

=== Brown Bag Report ===
The advertising agent who, prior to the Marlboro Man, developed ads for the product as a filtered "feminine brand" in 1981 developed "The Brown-Bag Report" with funding from Swift, Carnation, General Mills and American Can.

=== Symbolism ===
While in the United States the lunch box or lunch pail has been used as a symbol of the working class, Safire wrote: "In the metaphor of the modern worker, the brown bag has replaced the lunch pail." About a third of brown baggers are schoolchildren.

The "Brown Paper Bag Test" formed part of a colorist discriminatory practice in African-American history, in which an individual's skin tone was compared to the color of a brown paper bag.

Paper bags are occasionally worn over the head as symbol of embarrassment, for example, the Canadian comedian The Unknown Comic.

== Associations ==
The platform The Paper Bag consists of leading European paper manufacturers and producers of paper bags. It was created in 2017 to represent the interests of the European paper bag industry and to promote the advantages of paper packaging. The Paper Bag is steered by the organisations CEPI Eurokraft and EUROSAC.

EUROSAC is the European Federation of multiwall paper sack manufacturers. It was created in 1952 and is headquartered in Paris. It represents over 75% of European paper sack manufacturers. Its members operate in 20 different countries. Sack manufacturers from all continents and bag manufacturers also contribute to the federation as corresponding members, and more than 20 suppliers (paper, film, machine or glue manufacturers) are registered as associate members.

CEPI Eurokraft is the European Association for producers of sack kraft paper for the paper sack industry and kraft paper for the packaging industry. It was established in the 1930s to represent the Swedish, Norwegian and Finnish kraft paper manufacturers and now has eleven member companies in twelve countries.

== Other uses ==
Paper bags are commonly used for carrying items. However, they have been used for other purposes. In 1911, the English chef Nicolas Soyer wrote a cookbook, Paper-Bag Cookery, about how to use clean, odorless paper bags for cooking, as an extension of the en papillote technique and an alternative to pots and pans.
