= Toyo straw =

Smooth fabric material for straw hats

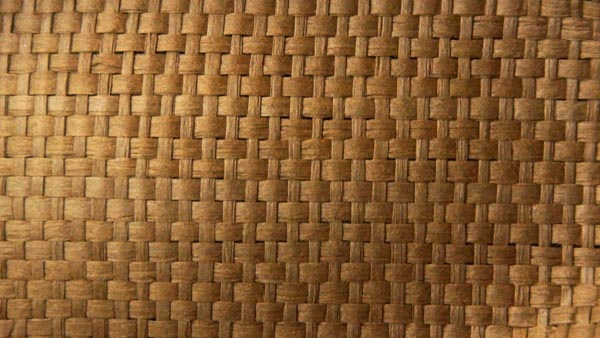
Toyo straw fabric

Toyo straw is a shiny smooth fabric made with shellacked viscose staple fiber of wood pulp origin for straw hats. It was originally developed in Japan as an improvement on Sufu wartime ersatz fabric during World War II, but is largely made in Taiwan, where there is the Tamsui Hat tradition, and the historical presence of Japanese industry.

This material is commonly used for straw hats and fedoras. Possibly due to its production process being somewhat similar to that of Washi traditional Japanese paper, or because it is made from pulp, this material is sometimes described incorrectly as "artificial paper straw".

Hats pressed from this material are smooth and lightweight in off-white or golden copper color. The fiber is coated with shellac, cellophane, or another polymer.

It is not known if Toyo was the original maker name of the fabric, but Toyo Rayon Co., Ltd., founded in 1926, was one of the largest Rayon viscose fiber makers in the world. This company has stopped producing Rayon, and changed its name to Toray Industries, Inc. in 1970.
