= Straw hat =

Hat made of straw

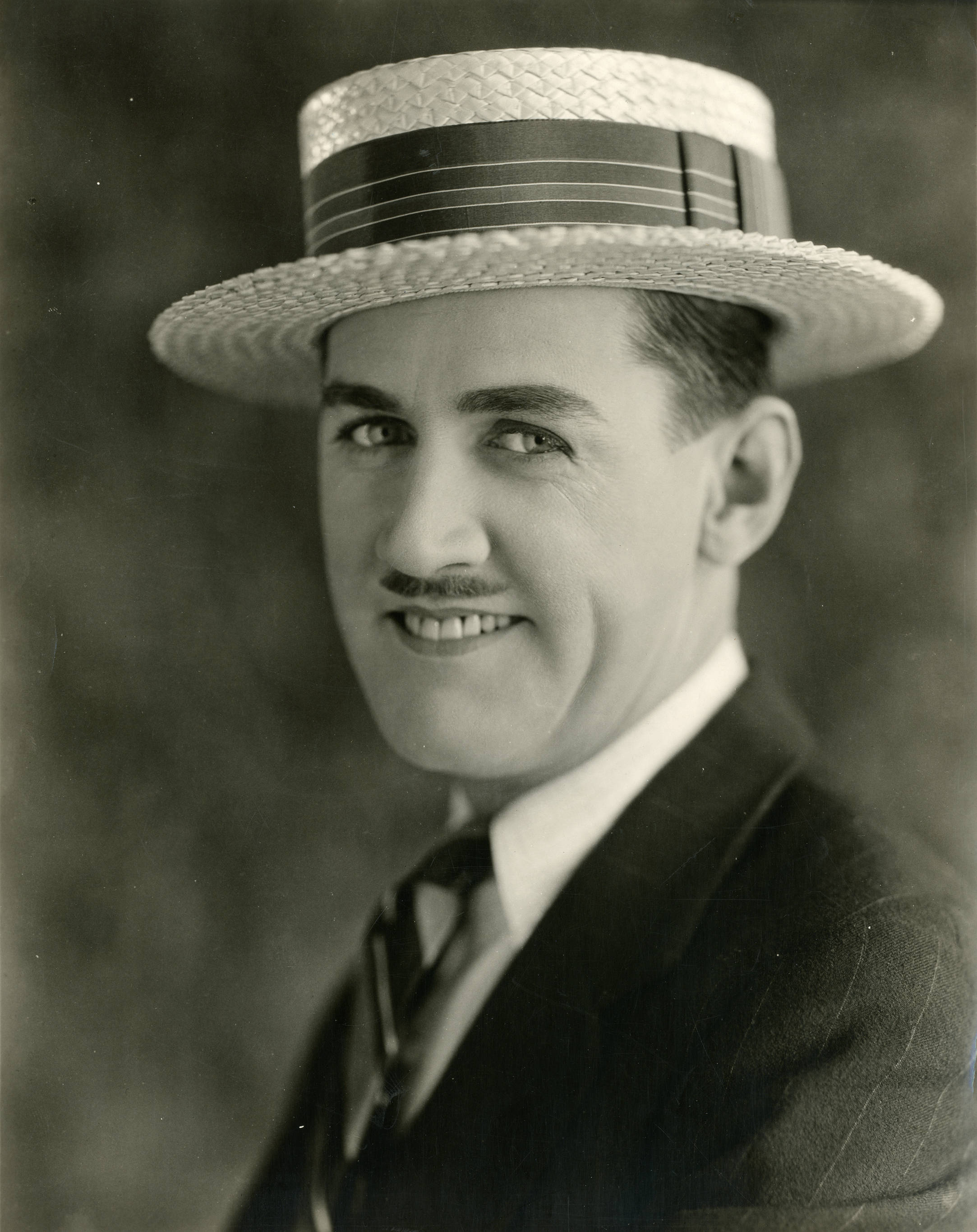
Charley Chase wearing an American straw hat (specifically a boater), 1926.

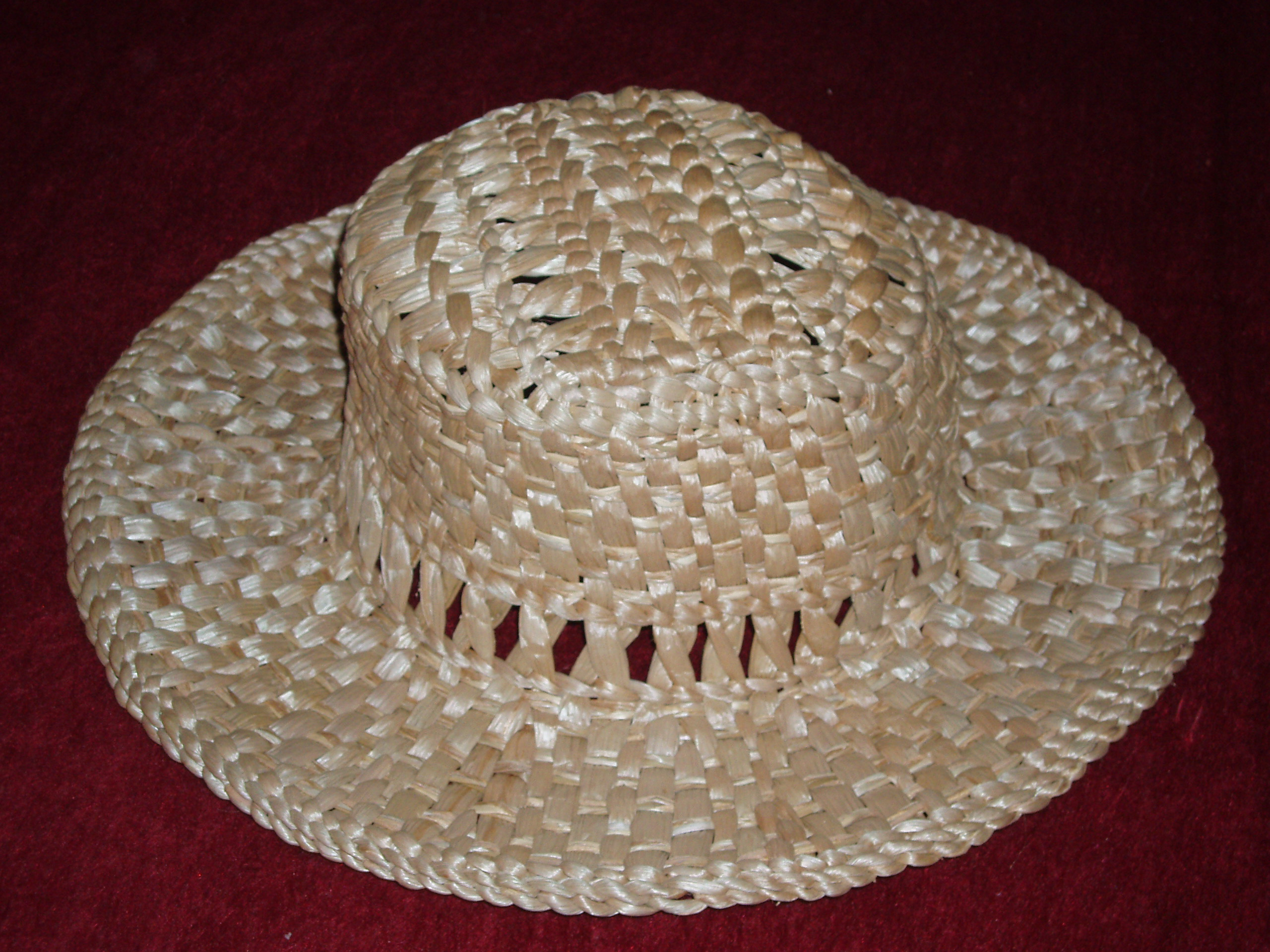
A traditional Ukrainian straw hat.

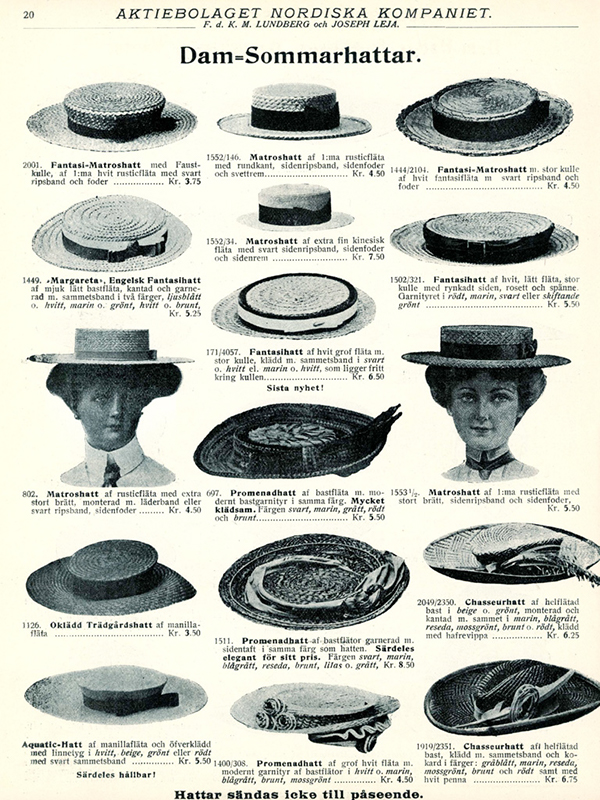
An ad for various styles of straw hats

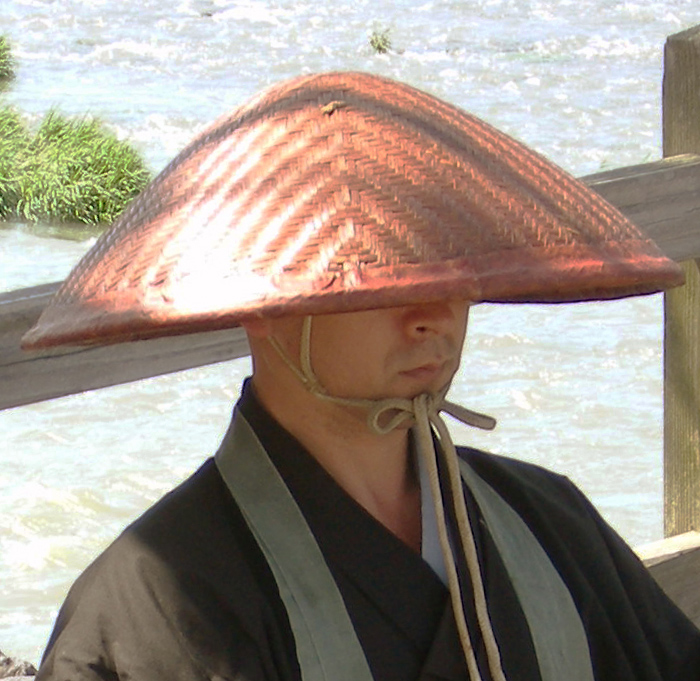
A straw cone hat worn by a Japanese buddhist monk

A straw hat is a wide-brimmed hat that is woven out of straw or straw-like synthetic materials. Straw hats are a type of sun hat designed to shade the head and face from direct sunlight, but are also used in fashion as a decorative element or a uniform.

== Materials ==
Commonly used fibers are:

- Wheat straw: (Milan straw, Tuscan, Livorno),
- Rye straw: used for the traditional bryl straw hats popular among the peasants of Belarus, southwestern Russia and Ukraine.
- Toquilla straw: flexible and durable fiber which is often made into hats, known as Panama hats, in Ecuador.
- Buntal straw (also called Parabuntal): from unopened Palm leaves or stems of the Buri Palm,
- Baku straw: 1x1 woven, made from the young stalks of the Talipot palm from Malabar and Ceylon,
- Braided hemp,
- Raffia,
- Shantung straw: made from high-performance paper which is rolled into a yarn to imitate straw, historically it was made of buntal
- Toyo straw: cellophane coated Washi,
- Bangora straw: made from a lower grade of Washi,
- Paperbraids: made from different paper strands from viscose from different Plants (Swiss Paglinastraw), (Silkpaper, Pith paper),
- Sisal (also called Parasisal for finer 2x2 weaves),
- Seagrass (Xian),
- Visca straw: an artificial straw made by spinning viscose in a flat filament capable of being braided, woven, or knitted and used especially for women's hats,
- Rush straw: a thick, stiff straw, used to manufacture inexpensive casual sun hats, made from rush grass (Juncus effesus, Juncus polycephalus), from the bulrushtypes sedge grass (Schoenoplectus lacustris, Cyperus papyrus, Typha (Typha domingensis, syn. Thypha angustata) (bulrush or cattail)} and other types seashore rushgrass (Sporobolus virginicus) or reed
- Jute,
- Abacá: (for Sinamay hats)
- Ramie,
- Artificial, synthetic straw, PP straw: made from Polypropylene, Polyethylene or from different blends from Acrylic, PP, PE, Polyester, Ramie and Paper
- other straw fibers that are mostly used in Asian conical hats are made from different palms (Corypha, Rattan, Trachycarpus, Phoenix), grasses Cane, Bamboo and rice straw (Kasa (hat))
- Chip straw: from White pine, Lombardy poplar, or English willow, has historically been used, but has become less common.

== Manufacture ==
There are several styles of straw hats, but all of them are woven using some form of plant fibre. Many of these hats are formed in a similar way to felt hats; they are softened by steam or by submersion in hot water, and then formed by hand or over a hat block. Finer and more expensive straw hats have a tighter and more consistent weave. Since it takes much more time to weave a larger hat than a smaller one, larger hats are more expensive.

== History ==
Straw hats have been worn in Africa, Asia, and Europe since after the Middle Ages during the summer months, and have changed little between the medieval times and today. They are worn, mostly by men, by all classes. Many can be seen in the calendar miniatures of the Très Riches Heures du Duc de Berry.

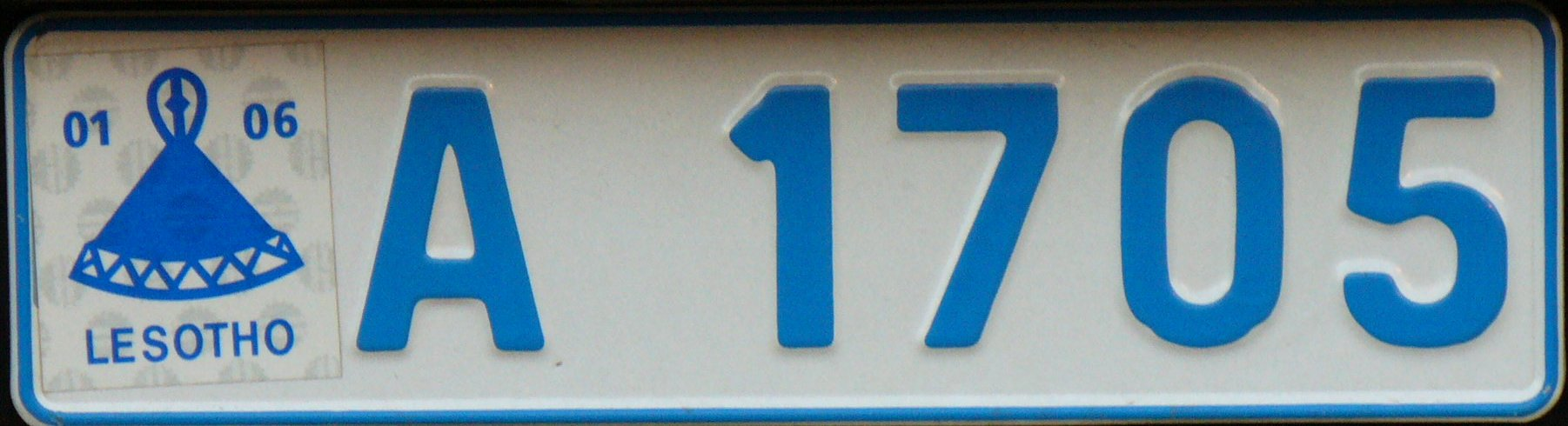
Lesotho license plate, featuring a mokorotlo

The mokorotlo, a local design of a straw hat, is the national symbol of the Basotho and Lesotho peoples, and of the nation of Lesotho. It is displayed on Lesotho license plates.

Betsey Metcalf Baker (née Betsey Metcalf; 1786–1867) was a manufacturer of straw bonnets, entrepreneur, and social activist based in Providence, Rhode Island and Westwood, Massachusetts. At age twelve, she developed a technique for braiding straw, allowing her to emulate the styles of expensive straw bonnets and make them accessible to working-class women. Rather than patent her technique, Baker taught the women in her community how to make straw bonnets, enabling the development of a cottage industry in New England.

Because of the Napoleonic Wars, the United States embargoed all trade with France and Great Britain for a time, creating a need for American-made hats to replace European millinery. The straw-weaving industry filled the gap, with over $500,000 ($9 million in today's money) worth of straw bonnets produced in Massachusetts alone in 1810.

On May 5, 1809, Mary Dixon Kies received a patent for a new technique of weaving straw with silk and thread to make hats. Some sources say she was the first woman to receive a US Patent, however other sources cite Hannah Slater in 1793, or Hazel Irwin, who received a patent for a cheese press in 1808, as the first.

President Theodore Roosevelt posed for a series of photos at the Panama Canal construction site in 1906. He was portrayed as a strong, rugged leader dressed crisply in light-colored suits and stylish straw fedoras. This helped popularize the straw "Panama hat".

The Old Order Amish, in the United States, still wear straw hats (similar to a Boater Hat), especially in the summer months. In the winter, or for formal wear, they will wear a felt hat.

In modern times, the Japanese Manga series One Piece has popularized straw hats mainly due to its symbolic status in the series, with the protagonist Monkey D. Luffy wearing a traditional wide brimmed Japanese straw hat.

== Types of straw hats ==
- Boater hat – a formal straw hat with a flat top and brim.
- Buntal hat – a semi-formal or informal traditional straw hat from the Philippines made from buntal fiber
- Conical hat – the distinctive hat worn primarily by farmers in Southeast Asia
- Panama hat – a fine and expensive hat made in Ecuador.
- Sombrero vueltiao - A straw hat with intricate patterns made from caña flecha by the Zenú people of Colombia.
- Salakot – a traditional conical or pointed rounded hat made usually made from rattan from the Philippines. It can also be made from gourds, tortoiseshell, or other fibers and weaving materials.
- Straw bonnet - Bonnet has been used as the name for a wide variety of headgear for both sexes—more often female—from the Middle Ages to the present. Some are made of straw.

== Gallery ==
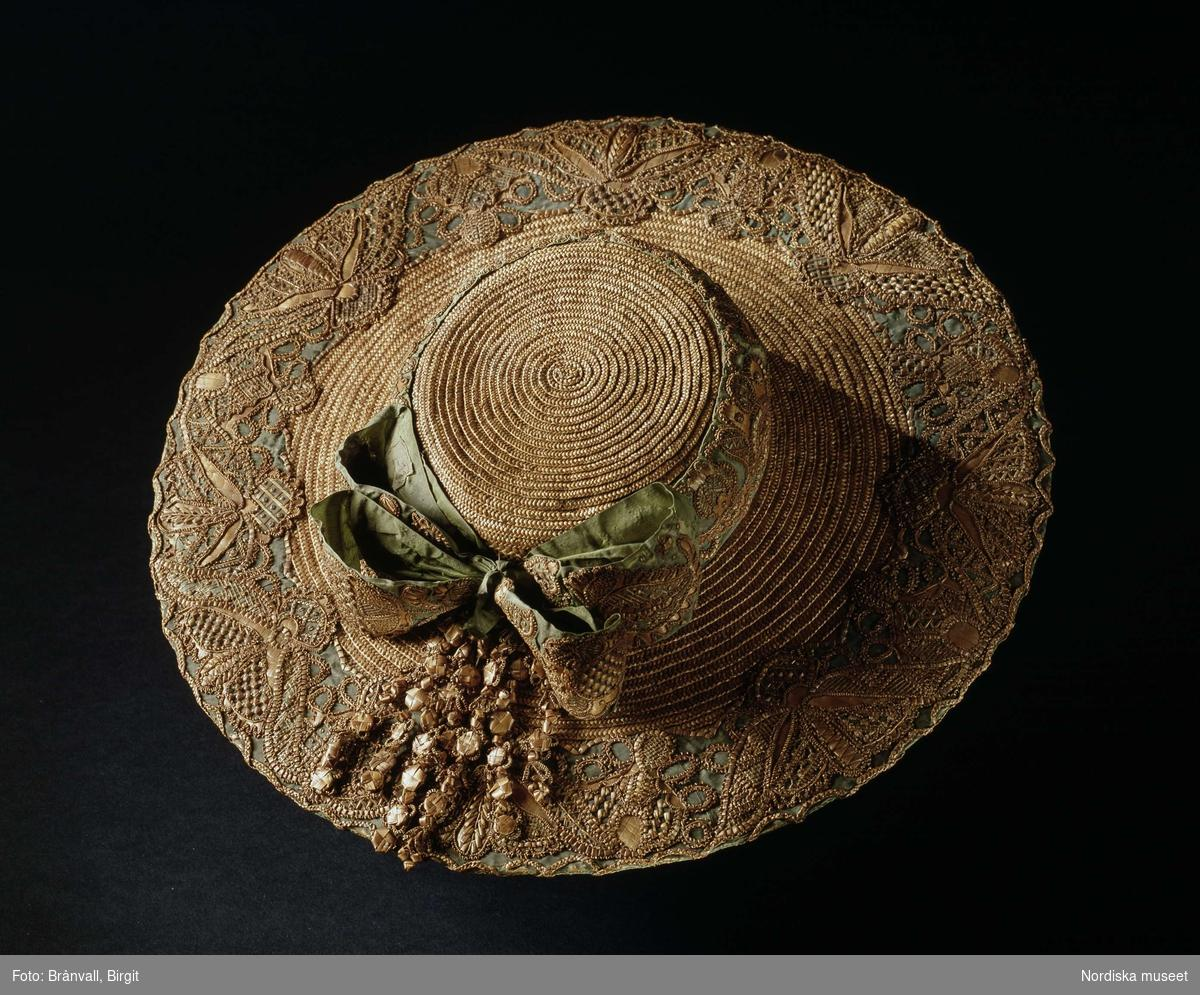
Straw hat from the middle of the 18th century

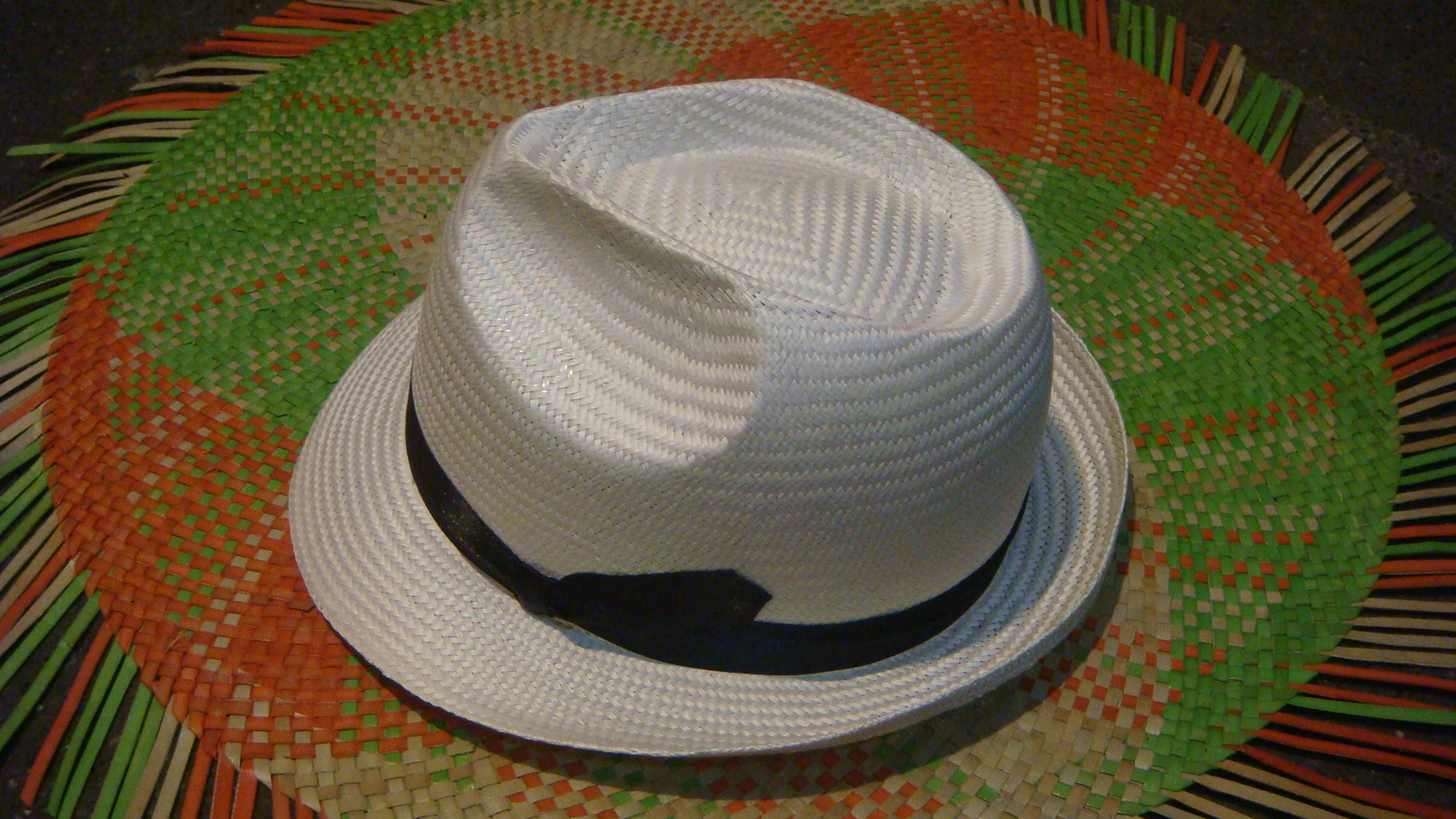
Buntal hat from the Philippines

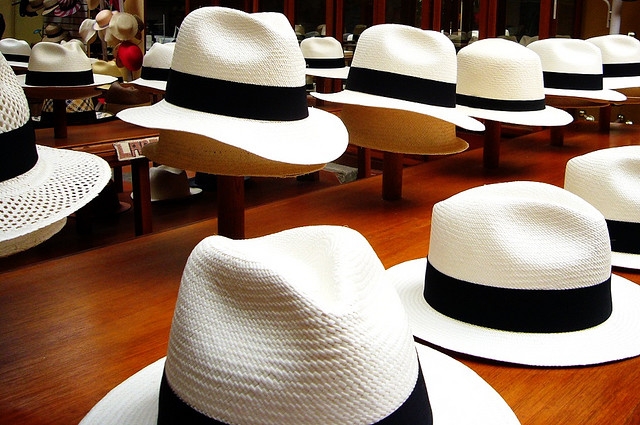
Panama hats from Cuenca, Ecuador

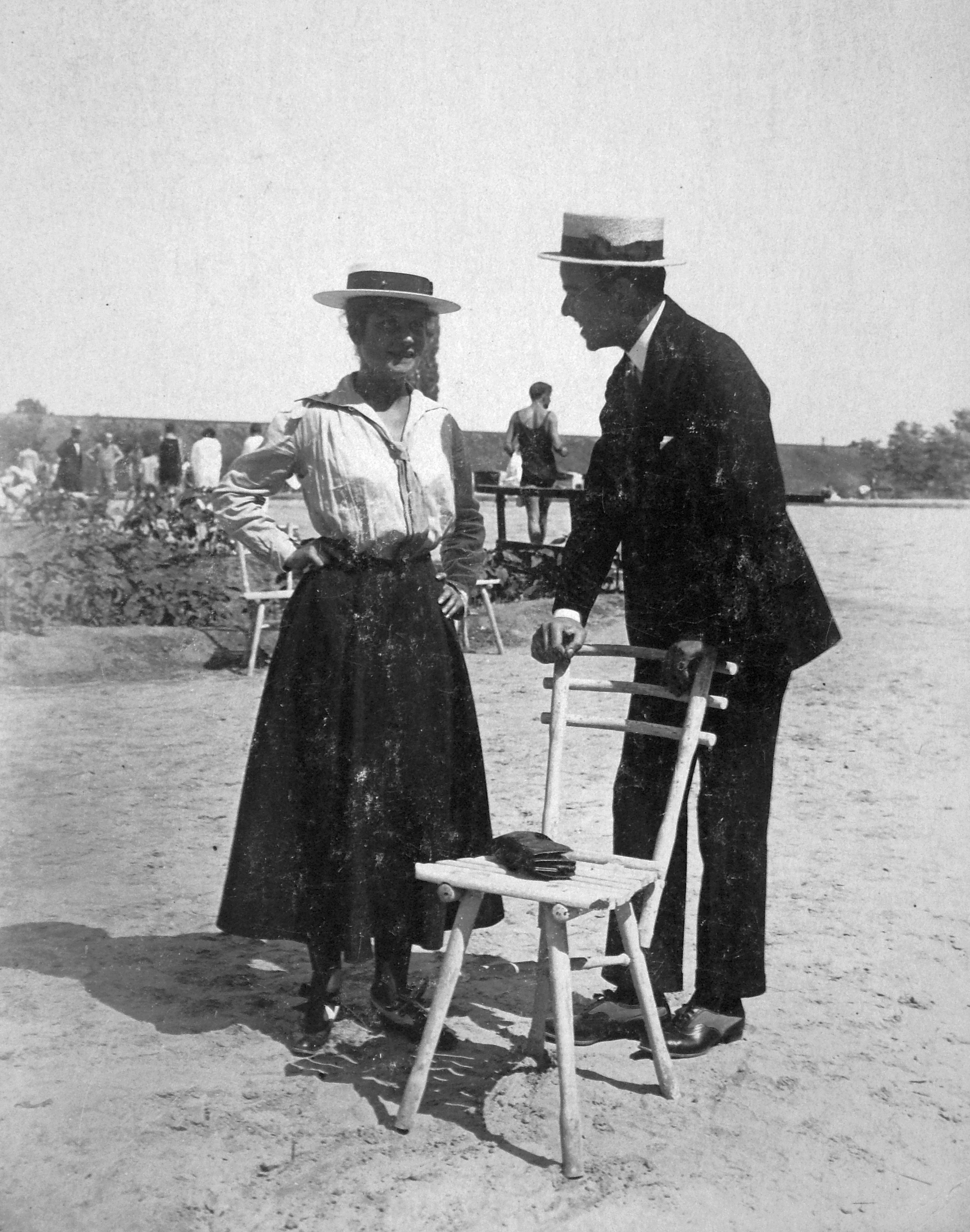
An image taken in 1912 depicting a man and woman wearing straw hats

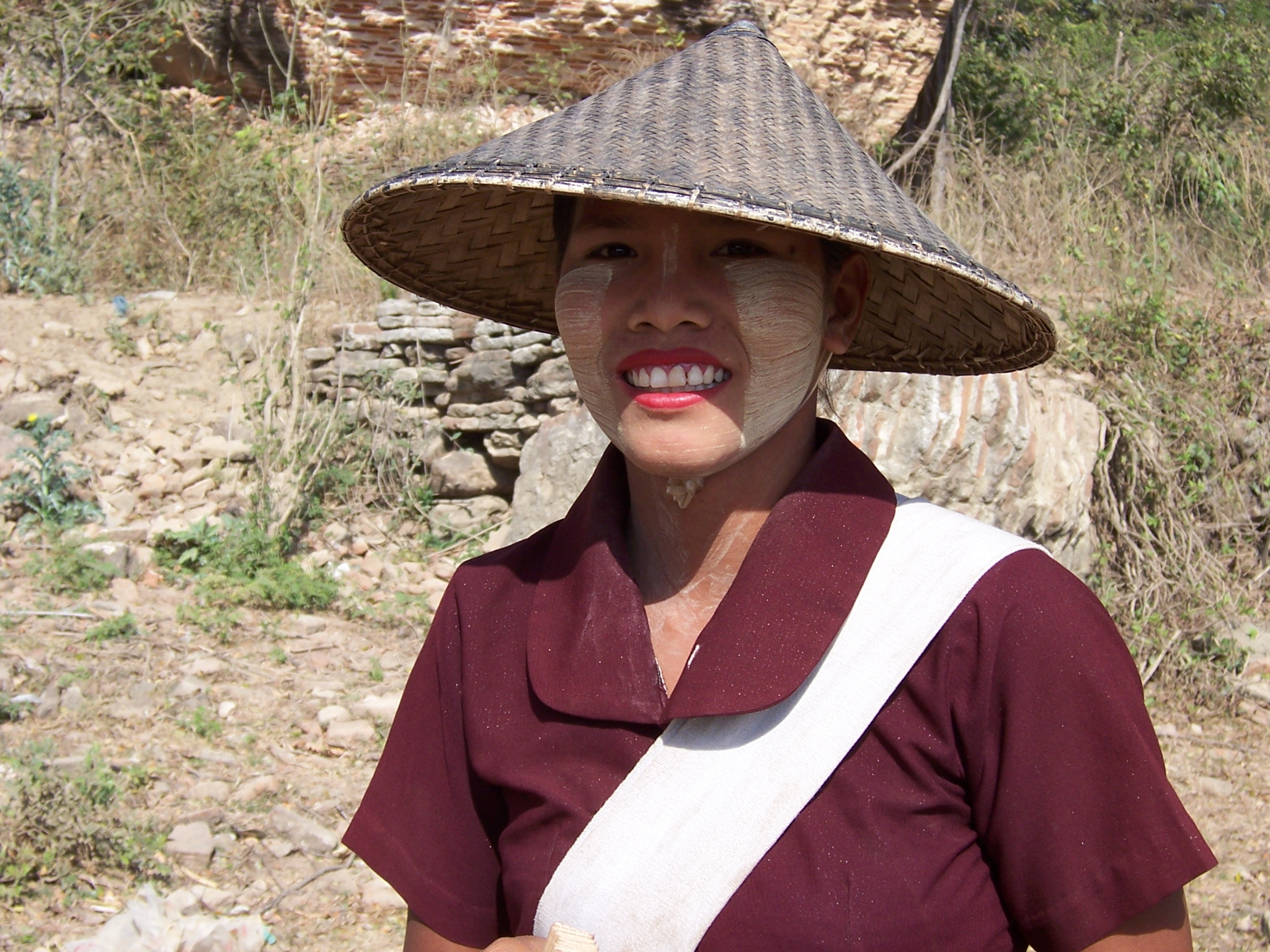
Conical Asian hat in Myanmar

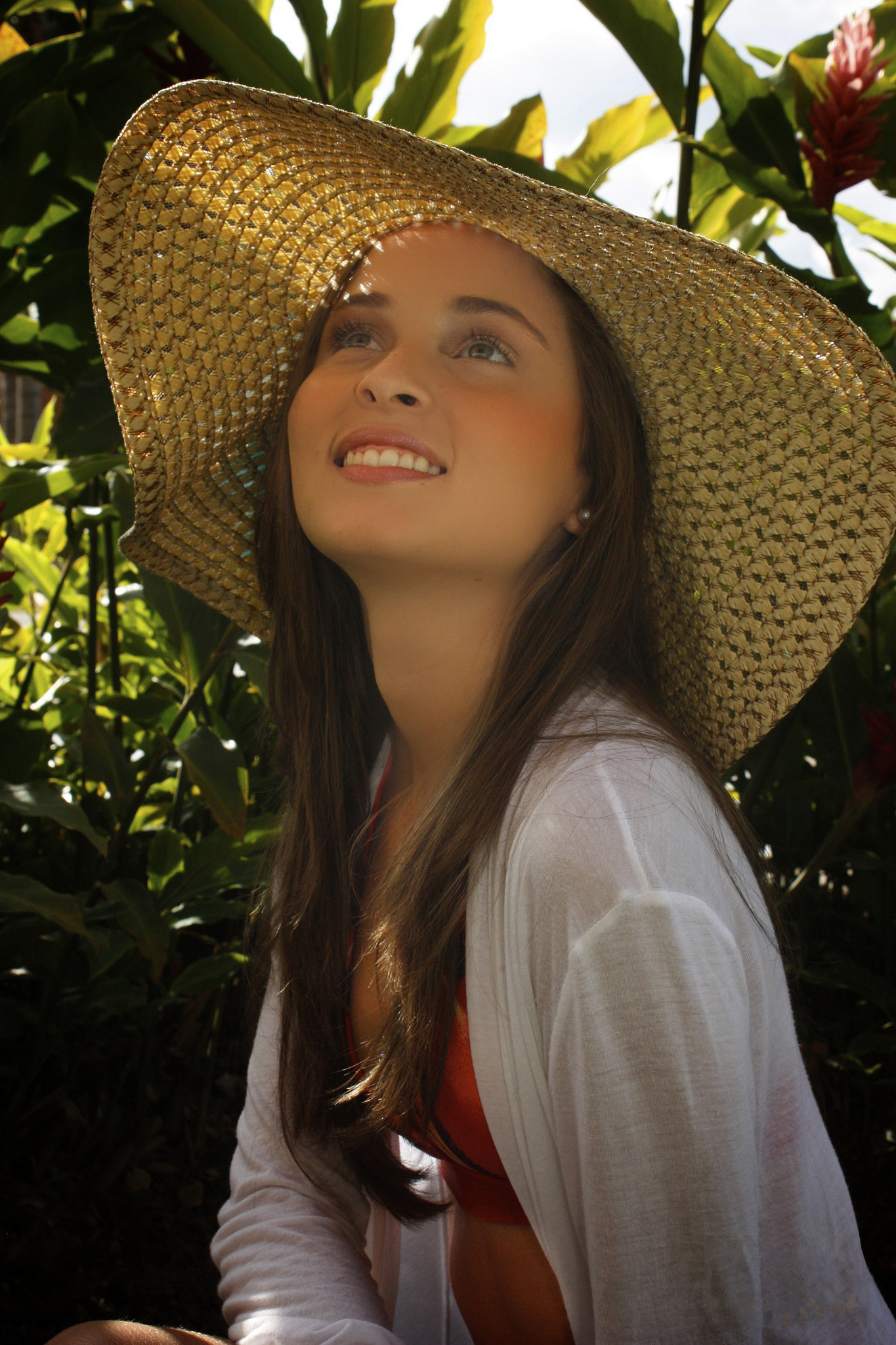
Young Woman wearing contemporary Western-style Sun Hat

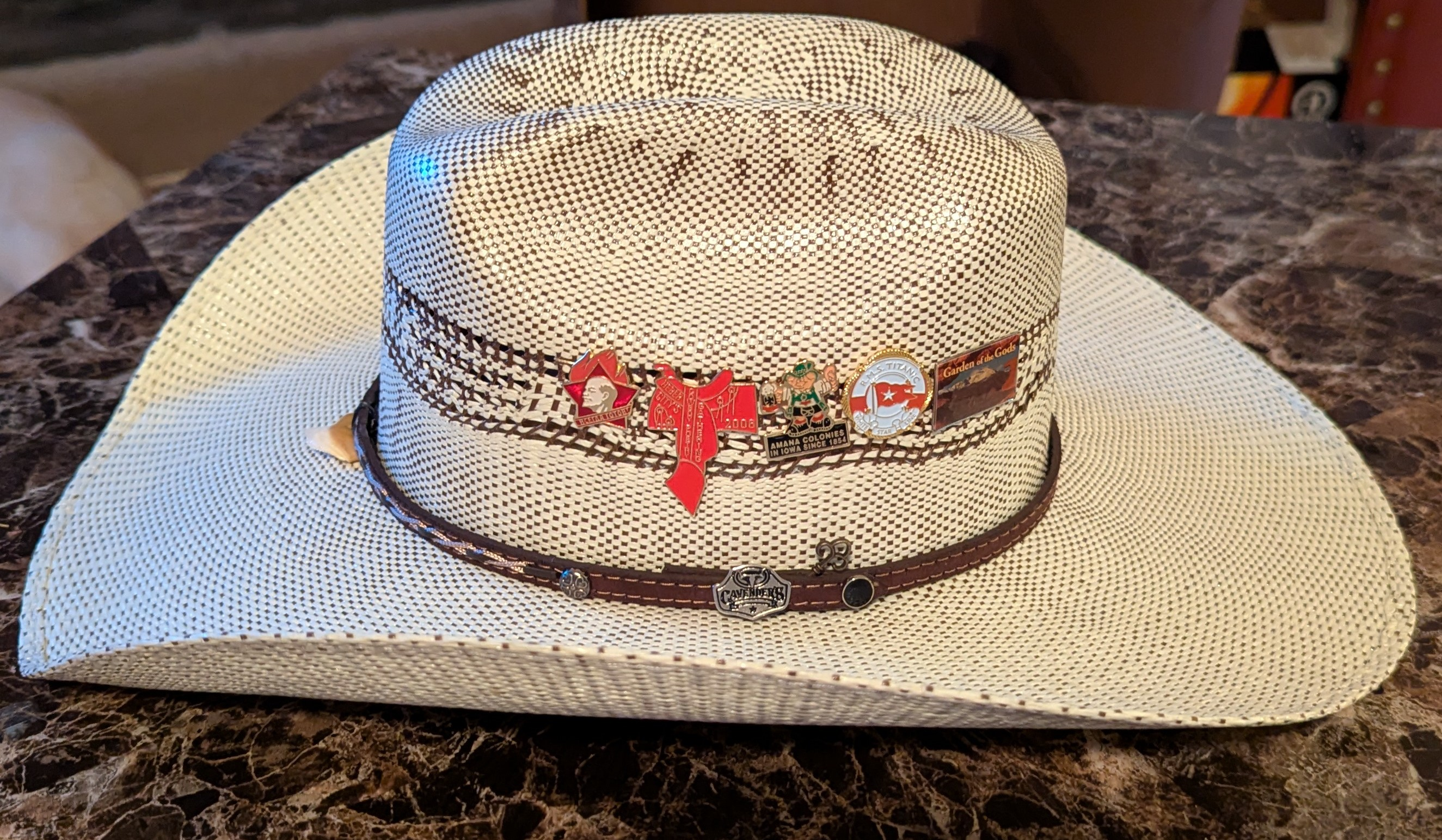
A bangora cowboy hat adorned with various enamel pins and a tiger shark tooth. Bangora refers to the machine woven perpendicular weave of the hat.

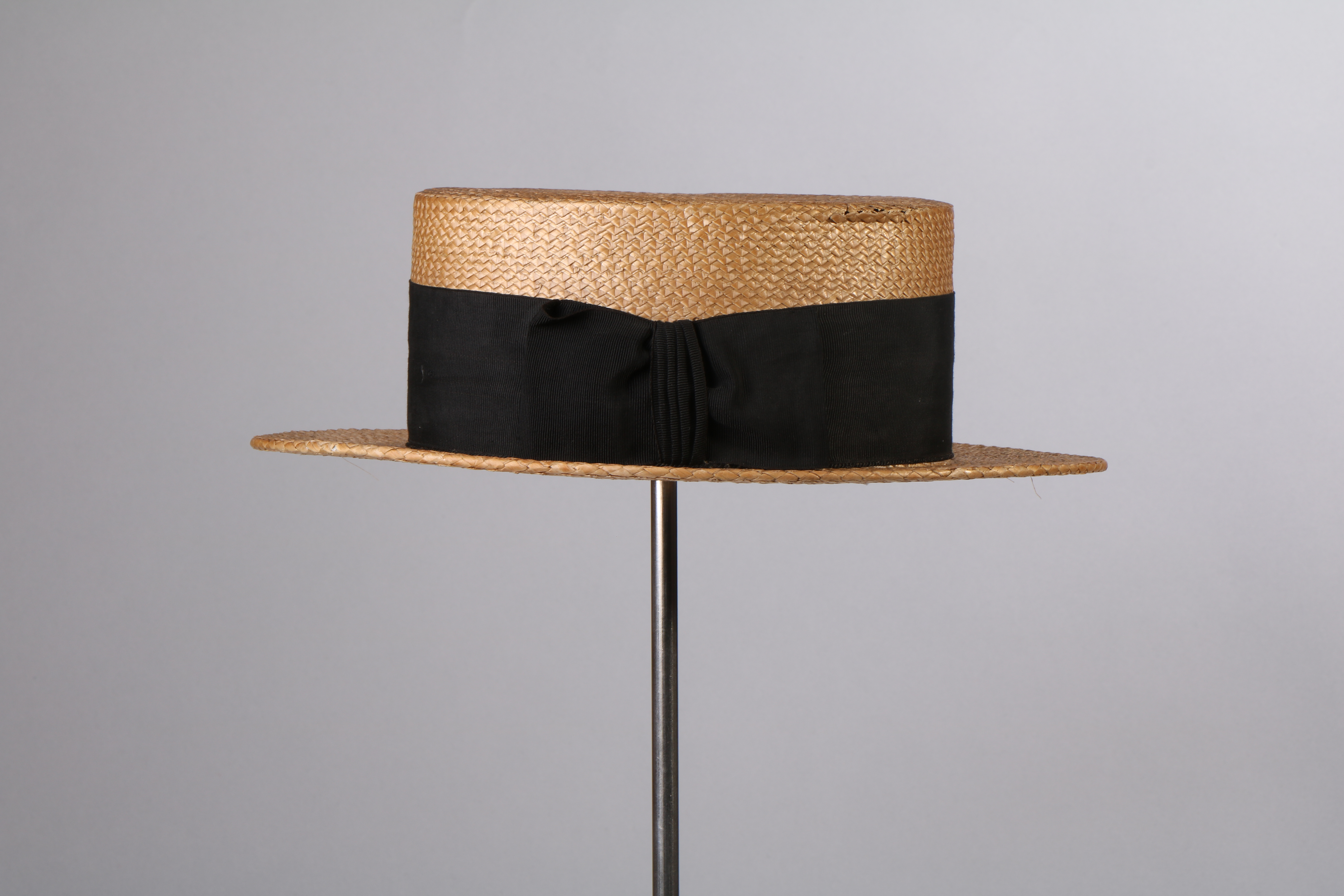
Hoed in natuurkleurige stro met breed zwart ripslint, 1910-1929, MMH.2008.0630, Modemuseum Hasselt.

== Arts ==
Artwork produced during the Middle Ages shows, among the more fashionably dressed, possibly the most spectacular straw hats ever seen on men in the West, notably those worn in the Arnolfini Portrait of 1434 by Jan van Eyck (tall, stained black) and by Saint George in a painting by Pisanello of around the same date (left). In the middle of the 18th century, it was fashionable for rich ladies to dress as country girls with a low crowned and wide brimmed straw hat to complete the look.

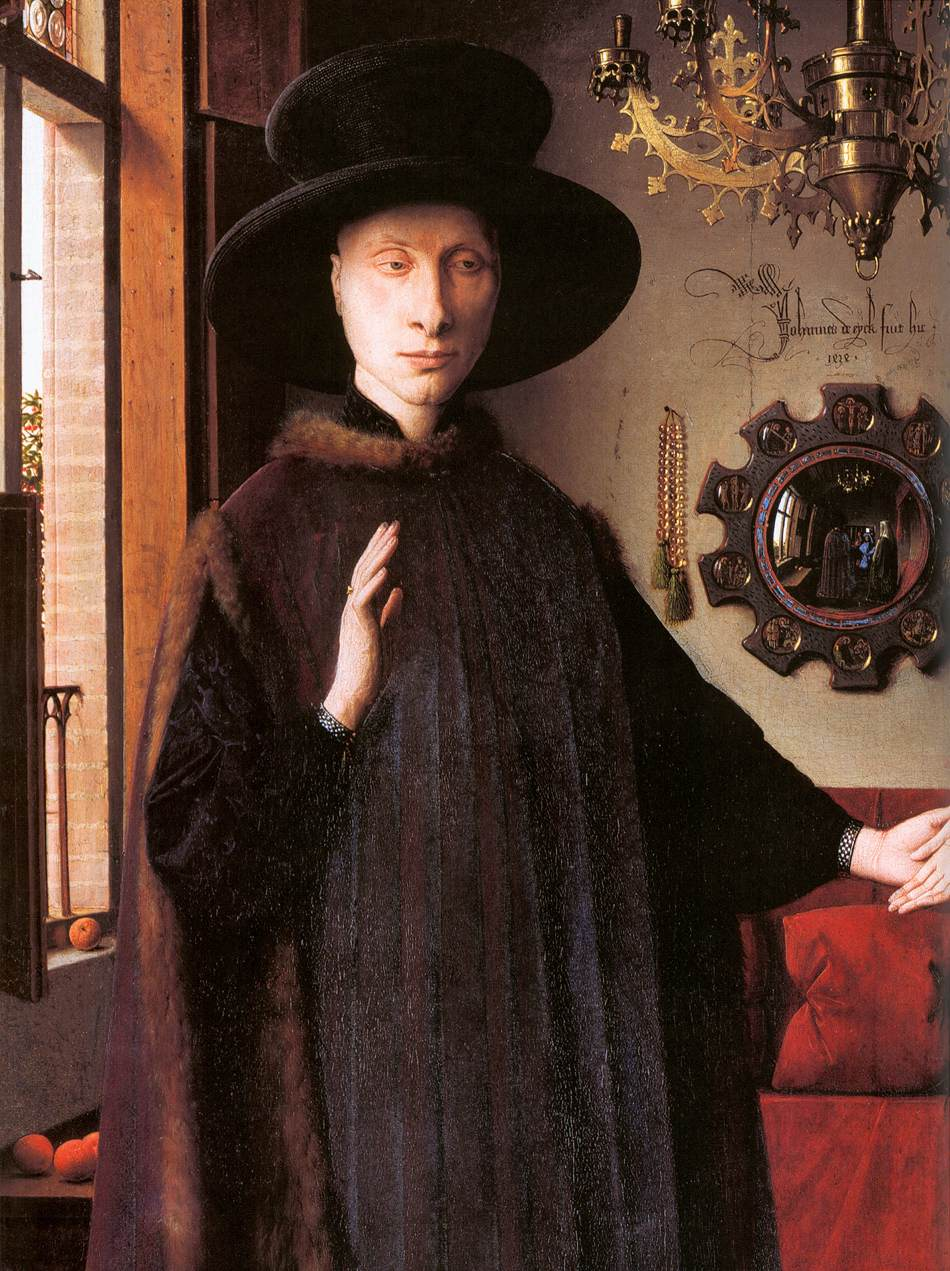
Arnolfini Portrait (detail) by Jan van Eyck

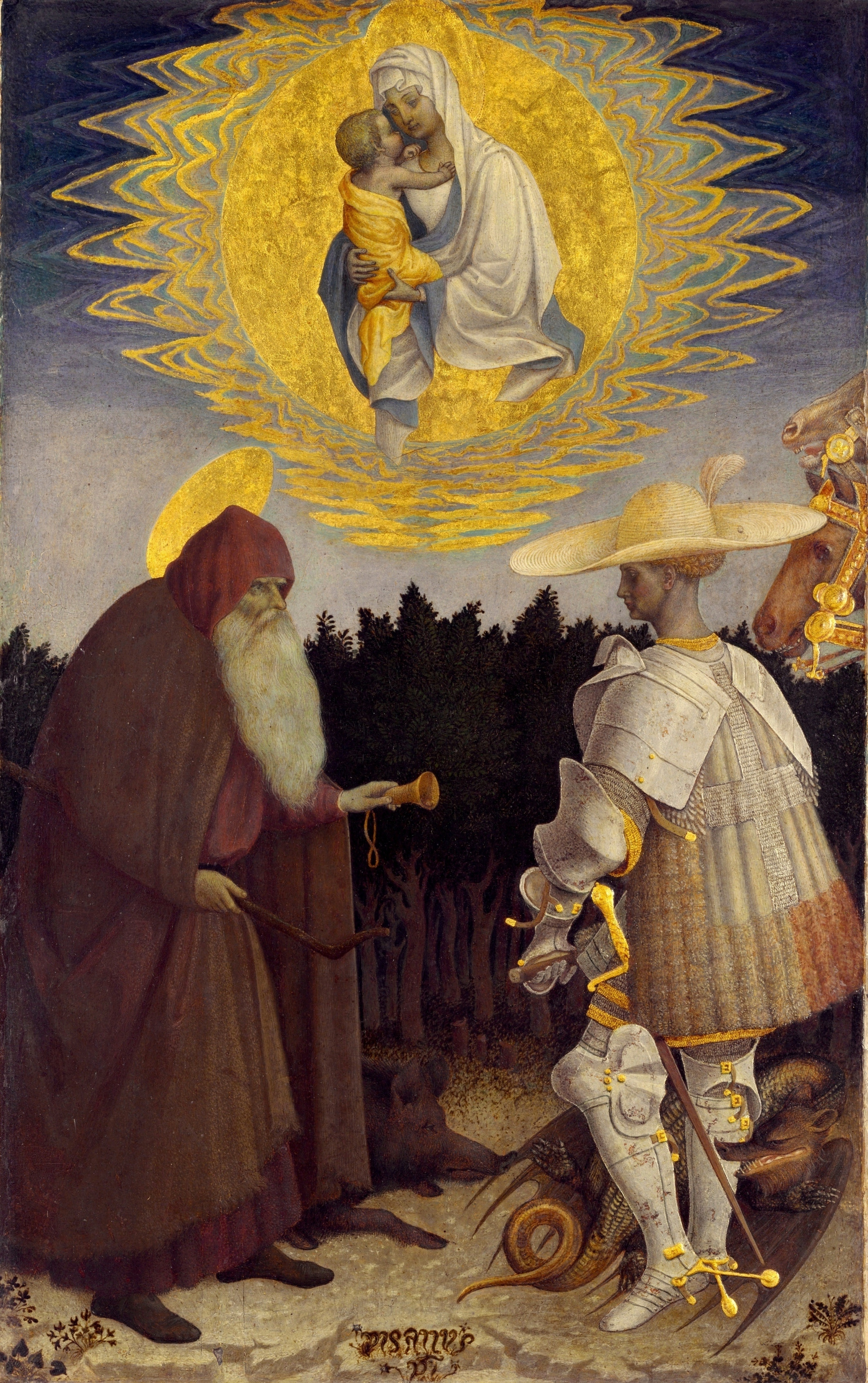
Virgin and Child with Saints George and Anthony by Pisanello

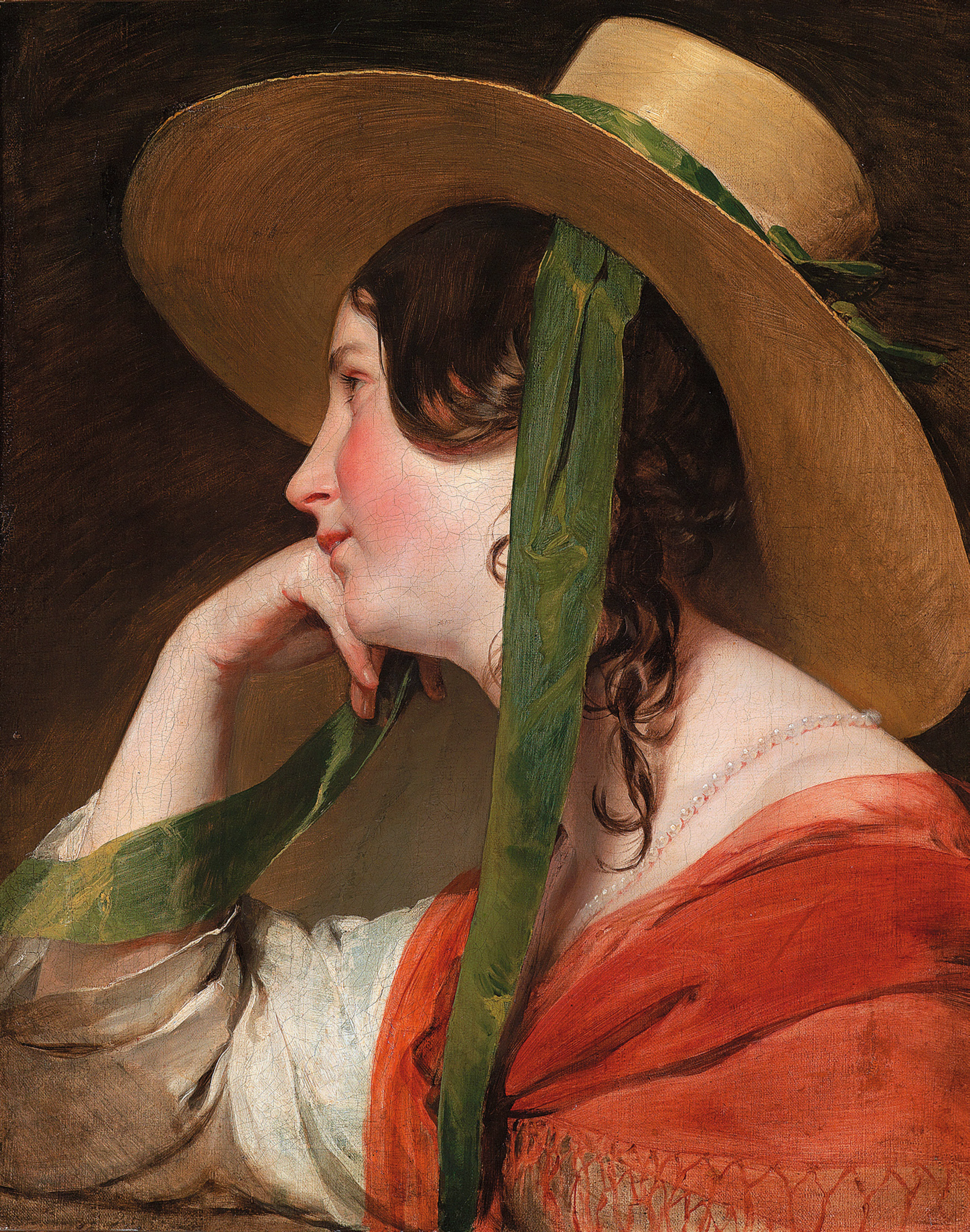
Mädchen mit Strohhut by Friedrich von Amerling

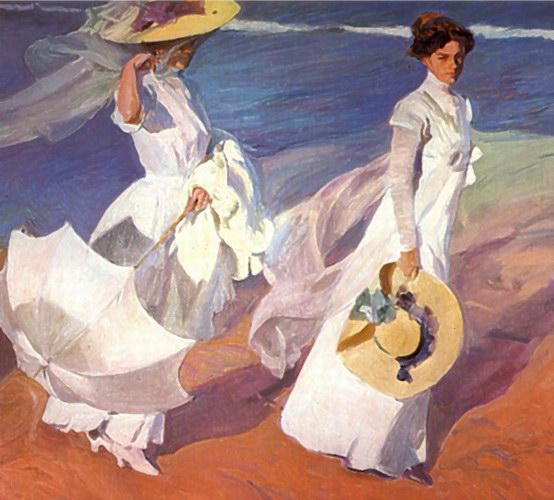
Walk on the Beach by Joaquín Sorolla

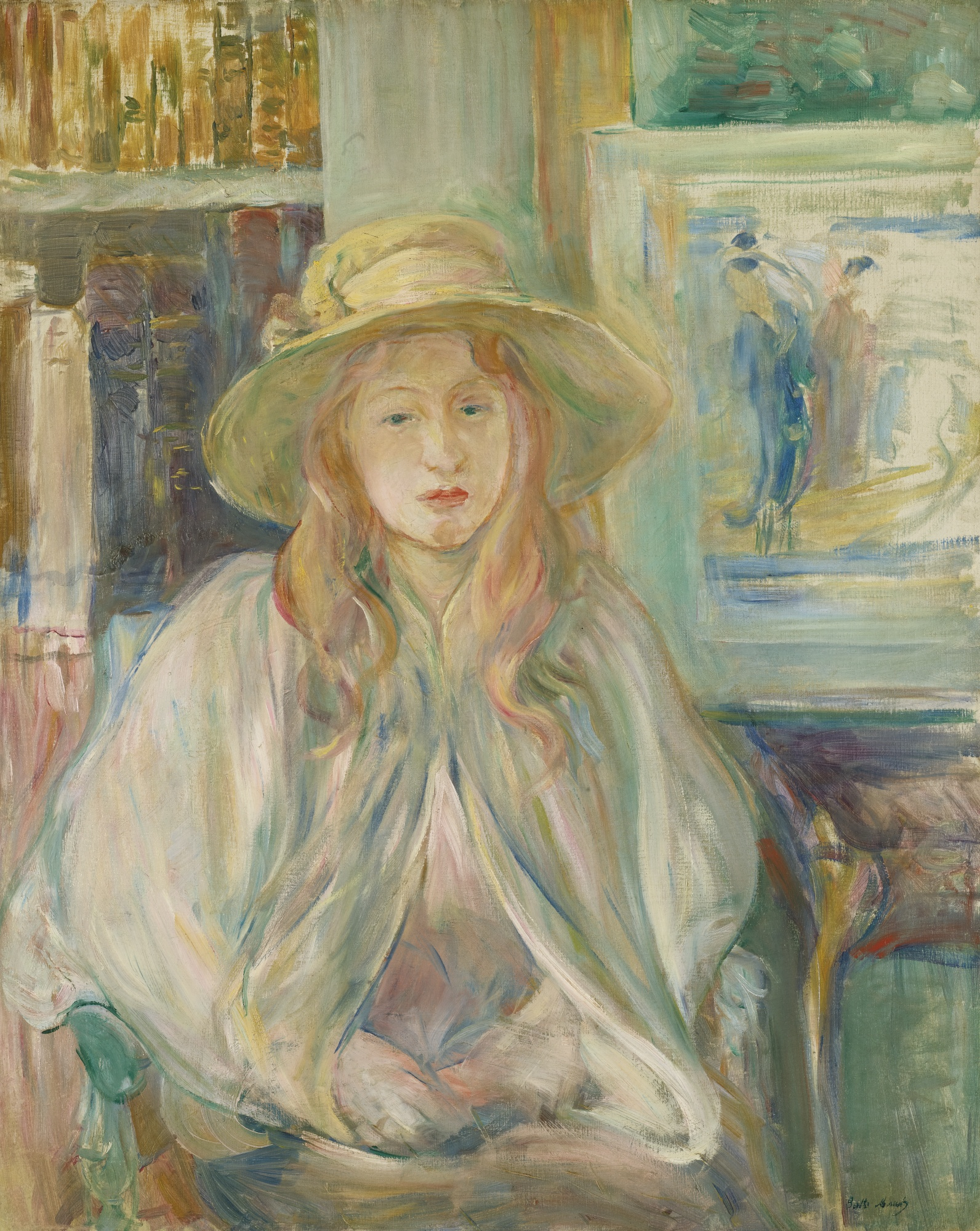
Fillette au chapeau de paille, by Berthe Morisot (1892).

== See also ==
- List of hat styles
- Straw Hat Riot
