= Lesotho at the 2023 World Aquatics Championships =

- Flag of Lesotho
- FINA code: LES
- National federation: Lesotho Swimmers Association

in Fukuoka, Japan
- Competitors: 1 in 1 sport
- Medals: Gold 0 Silver 0 Bronze 0 Total 0

World Aquatics Championships appearances
- 1973; 1975; 1978; 1982; 1986; 1991; 1994; 1998; 2001; 2003; 2005; 2007; 2009; 2011; 2013; 2015; 2017; 2019; 2022; 2023; 2024

Lesotho is set to compete at the 2023 World Aquatics Championships in Fukuoka, Japan from 14 to 30 July.

== Swimming ==
Lesotho entered 1 swimmer.

Men

Athlete	Event	Heat		Semifinal		Final	
Athlete	Event	Time	Rank	Time	Rank	Time	Rank
Refiloe Chopho	50 metre freestyle	31.68	118	Did not advance			
Refiloe Chopho	50 metre butterfly	34.21	89	Did not advance			
