= Mokorotlo =

Traditional Sotho hat and national symbol of Lesotho

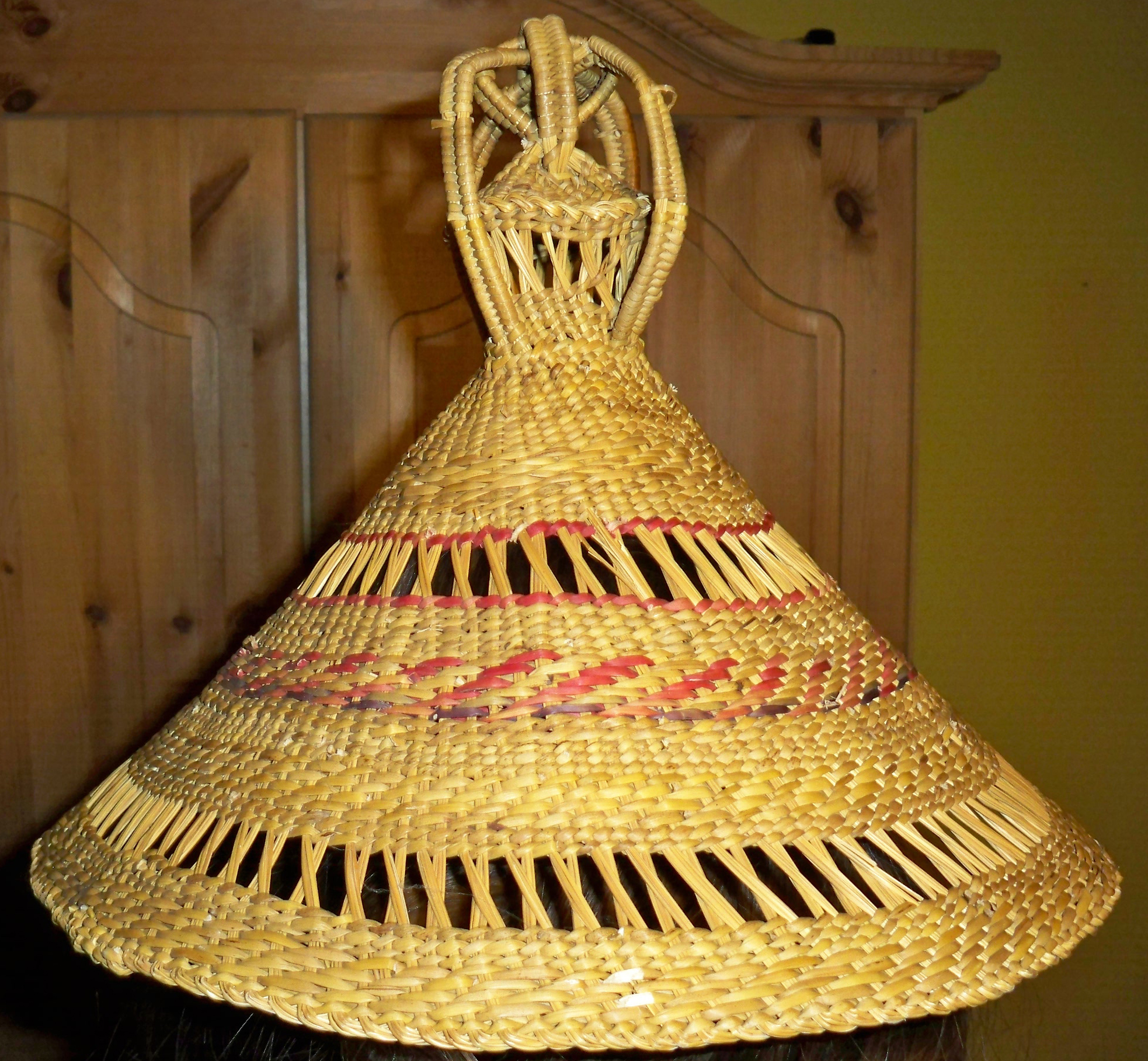

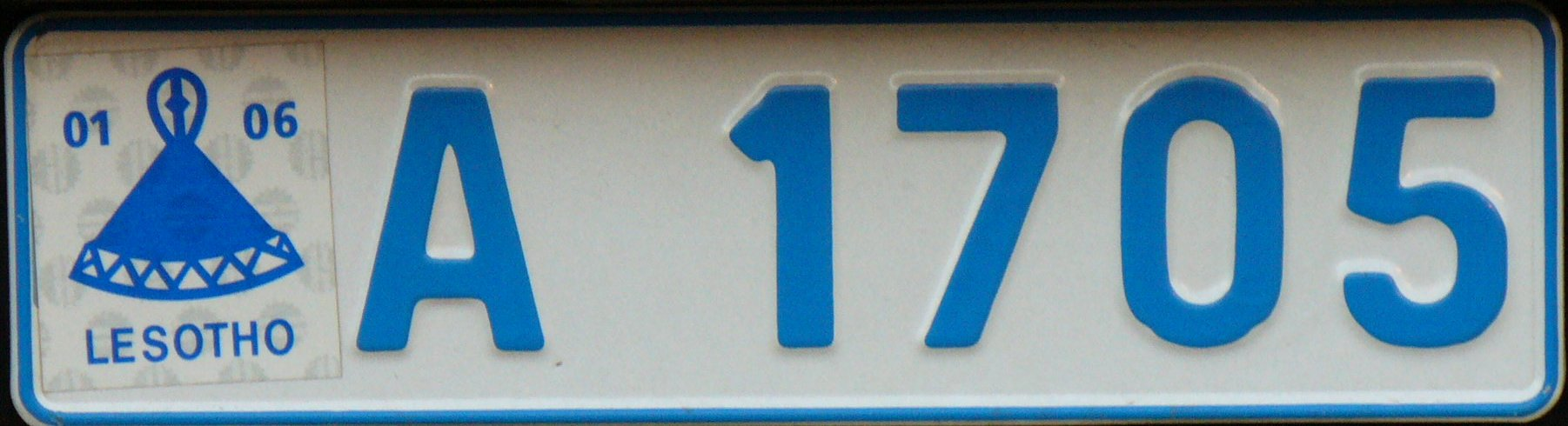
Lesotho licence plate, featuring a mokorotlo

A mokorotlo, also known as a modianywe, is a type of straw hat widely used for traditional Sotho clothing, and is the national symbol of Lesotho and the national symbol of the Basotho and Lesotho people. An image of the hat appears on the flag of Lesotho, and on Lesotho vehicle licence plates. The design is believed to have been inspired by the conical mountain Mount Qiloane. It is known as “molianyeoe”, which means "he who executes judgement in court" in Sesotho. It is manufactured from an indigenous grass known as “mosea” or “leholi”.

== History ==
The origins of the mokorotlo are unclear. A similarly shaped hat, called a toedang, was commonly worn by the Cape Malays, who are descendants of slaves from the East Indies. It is believed that the Sotho may have adopted the mokorotlo through exposure to these hats.

The mokorotlo was likely adopted in the early 20th century, when chiefs began to wear the hat and began singing a song also known as the ‘Mokorotlo’ to garner support at village “Pitso”, which is a gathering. In its original form, it was exclusively worn by males to gatherings. However, in the 1950s, new designs were developed to cater to women.

== Symbolism ==
The Sotho display the mokorotlo in their homes, indicating that they uphold the customs and acknowledge their bonds with their Balimo.

It also serves to protect the home against danger and other evil influences. The hat is an important part of Sotho cultural attire that is worn to reflect national identity and pride.

== Alternative uses ==
Other warfare rituals, songs and poems go by the generic name of mokorotlo. It is also noted that mokorotlo refers to the traditional male dance performed by male initiates and elders.
