= Qiloane =

- Community Council
- Geographic Center of Community
- Coordinates: 29°21′45″S 27°37′55″E
- Country: Lesotho
- District: Maseru District
- Elevation: 5,026 ft (1,532 m)

Population (2006)
  - Total: 24,093
- Time zone: UTC+2 (CAT)
- Coordinates computed from Lesotho Villages file.

Qiloane is a community council located in the Maseru District of Lesotho. Its population in 2006 was 24,093.

== Mount Qiloane ==
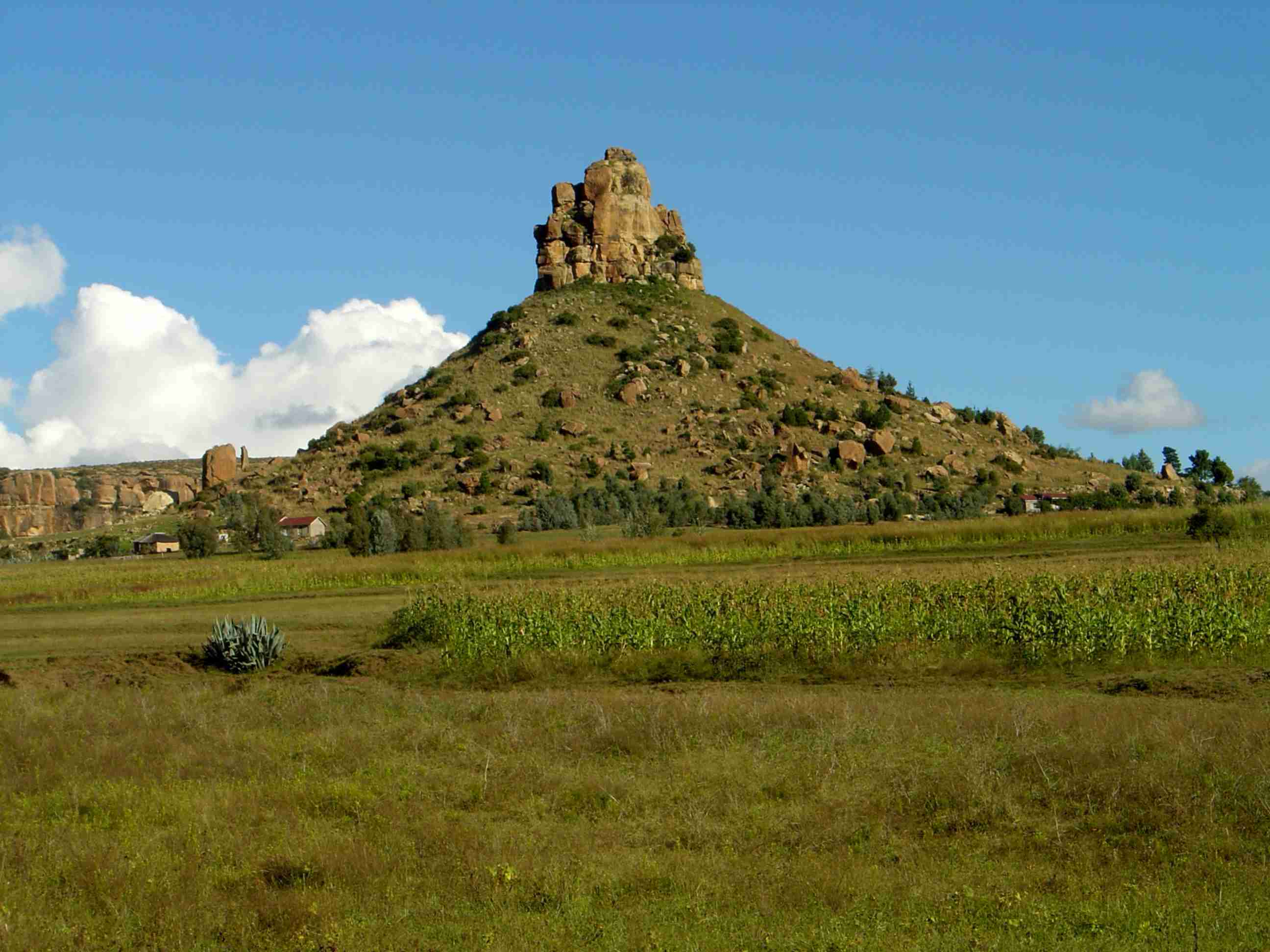
Mount Qiloane

The profile of Mount Qiloane, the legendary conical mountain close to Thaba Bosiu, and described by Masupha as Mother and Father, inspired the traditional Basotho Hat called mokorotlo. Qiloane Hill is crowned by a pillar of Cave Sandstone some 100 feet (30 m) high. It is about 15 feet (4.6 m) broad on top, and is composed of three immense steps gradually tapering to a point. Elevation of the hilltop is 5,640 ft (1,719 m) and is located at coordinates 29°20′53″S 27°41′10″E.

== Villages ==
The community of Qiloane includes the following villages:

- Boqate (Ha Majara)
- Ha 'Mamotho
- Ha Bosofo
- Ha Fako
- Ha Jobo
- Ha Khoabane
- Ha Lekoro
- Ha Lenono
- Ha Lephoi
- Ha Lesoiti
- Ha Lithupa
- Ha Maja
- Ha Majara
- Ha Makhalanyane
- Ha Makhoathi
- Ha Mamotho
- Ha Mathula
- Ha Mohalanyane
- Ha Mohasoa
- Ha Mosalla
- Ha Mothae
- Ha Motloheloa
- Ha Motsu
- Ha Mpesi
- Ha Nkhata
- Ha Ntlama
- Ha Ntsane
- Ha Qhali
- Ha Rafutho
- Ha Ramakha
- Ha Ramoejane
- Ha Rapheko
- Ha Raphuthi
- Ha Rasenkisi
- Ha Rathoko
- Ha Seeiso
- Ha Sekete
- Ha Sofonia
- Ha Teronko
- Ha Thiba-Khoali
- Ha Tonki
- Khokhotsaneng
- Lekhalong
- Lihaseng
- Liolong
- Liphookoaneng
- Mafikaneng
- Mafikaneng (Ha Khechane)
- Mahlabatheng
- Majakaneng
- Masekoeng
- Monyakoana
- Ntlo-kholo (Ha Sepake)
- Ntlo-kholo (Mahaheng)
- Ntlokholo
- Sekantšing
- Sekhutloaneng
- Thaba-Khupa
