= Lesotho at the 2024 World Aquatics Championships =

- Flag of Lesotho
- FINA code: LES
- National federation: Lesotho Swimmers Association

in Doha, Qatar
- Competitors: 1 in 1 sport
- Medals: Gold 0 Silver 0 Bronze 0 Total 0

World Aquatics Championships appearances
- 1973; 1975; 1978; 1982; 1986; 1991; 1994; 1998; 2001; 2003; 2005; 2007; 2009; 2011; 2013; 2015; 2017; 2019; 2022; 2023; 2024

Lesotho competed at the 2024 World Aquatics Championships in Doha, Qatar from 2 to 18 February.

== Competitors ==
The following is the list of competitors in the Championships.

Sport	Men	Women	Total
Swimming	1	0	1
Total	1	0	1

== Swimming ==
Lesotho entered 1 swimmers.

Men

Athlete	Event	Heat		Semifinal		Final	
Athlete	Event	Time	Rank	Time	Rank	Time	Rank
Refiloe Chopho	50 metre freestyle	29.56	112	Did not advance			
Refiloe Chopho	50 metre breaststroke	38.00	57	Did not advance			
