= Betsey Metcalf Baker =

Manufacturer of straw bonnets

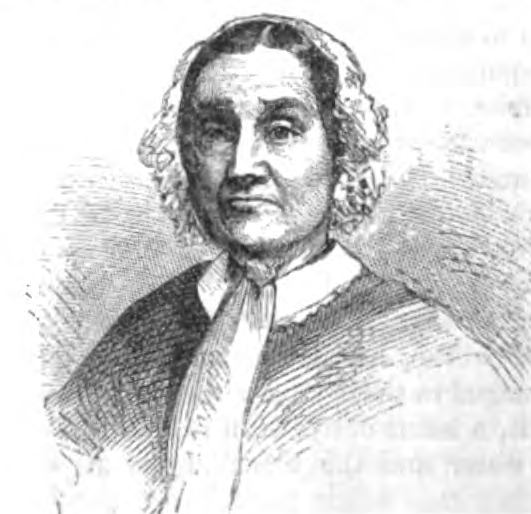
- Born: Betsey Metcalf; March 29, 1786; Providence, Rhode Island, US
- Died: February 24, 1867 (aged 80); Dedham, Massachusetts, US
- Occupations: Manufacturer of straw bonnets, entrepreneur, social activist
- Spouse: Obed Baker (m. 1807)

Betsey Metcalf Baker (née Betsey Metcalf; 1786–1867) was an American manufacturer of straw bonnets, entrepreneur, and social activist based in Providence, Rhode Island and Westwood, Massachusetts. At age twelve, she developed a technique for braiding straw, allowing her to emulate the styles of expensive straw bonnets and make them accessible to working-class women. Rather than patent her technique, Baker taught the women in her community how to make straw bonnets, enabling the development of a cottage industry in New England.

== Biography ==
=== Early life ===
Betsey was born Betsey Metcalf on March 29, 1786, in Providence, Rhode Island, to Joel Metcalf, a tanner and currier, and Lucy Gay Metcalf. The family lived on Benefit Street.

At the age of twelve, Betsey fashioned her first bonnet from split oak straw, gathered from her father's field. She modeled it after an expensive imported bonnet that she had seen in a local store. For this bonnet, Metcalf made use of a straw plaiting technique interweaving seven strands and lined with pink silk. Until this time, so-called "Leghorn" bonnets from the Italian region of Livonia had a reputation for being the highest quality bonnets, but these could be quite expensive. Over time, Betsey's bonnet-making method proved more accessible and less expensive than these established methods due to an embargo that was put in place against imports from Napoleonic Europe. Using her new method, she and her sister came in time to have a profitable business, bringing in up to a dollar a day, and she began to teach other local women this new technique.

=== Adulthood ===
As an adult, Baker moved to West Dedham (current Westwood, Massachusetts) for a schoolteacher position, and in 1807 married Obed Baker, a transporter of munitions and supplies. In time, Betsey became involved in activist causes. During the Great Famine of Ireland, she collected food, clothing and other supplies to send to Ireland. She also advocated for ending slavery.

Baker was honored by the state of Rhode Island and Governor Elisha Dyer in 1858, who commissioned a portrait of her to hang in the newly-constructed Union Station, with the following inscription:

Resolved, That Mrs. Baker, as the first inventor in the United States of the art of plaiting, or braiding straw for ladies’ hats and bonnets, - a business which now gives employment to thousands of persons and millions of capital, - is especially entitled to honor and respect from this society, incorporated for the encouragement of domestic industry in this her native State.

— Rhode Island Governor Elisha Dyer, Rhode Island Society for the Encouragement of Domestic Industry (1858)

The governor encouraged her to write an account of her life in diary form, now under the possession of the Rhode Island Historical Society in Providence.

=== Death and legacy ===
Betsey Metcalf Baker died on February 24, 1867, aged 80, in Westwood, Massachusetts. Her daughter Betsey Baker was a teacher in West Dedham, who shared her name (born 1822).
