= Lesotho at the 2013 World Aquatics Championships =

- Flag of Lesotho
- FINA code: LES
- National federation: Lesotho Swimmers Association

in Barcelona, Spain
- Competitors: 1 in 1 sports
- Medals: Gold 0 Silver 0 Bronze 0 Total 0

World Aquatics Championships appearances
- 1973; 1975; 1978; 1982; 1986; 1991; 1994; 1998; 2001; 2003; 2005; 2007; 2009; 2011; 2013; 2015; 2017; 2019; 2022; 2023; 2024

Lesotho competed at the 2013 World Aquatics Championships in Barcelona, Spain from 19 July to 4 August 2013.

== Swimming ==
Swimmers from Lesotho achieved qualifying standards in the following events (up to a maximum of 2 swimmers in each event at the A-standard entry time, and 1 at the B-standard):

Women

Athlete	Event	Heat		Semifinal		Final	
Athlete	Event	Time	Rank	Time	Rank	Time	Rank
Khahliso Mpeta	50 m freestyle	DNS		did not advance			
Khahliso Mpeta	50 m breaststroke	DNS		did not advance			
