= Sufu =

Inexpensive ersatz cloth made of wood fibers

Sufu, short for ステープル・ファイバー (SuTe-PuRu FuaiBa-, Staple Fibre), was a wartime fabric material used in Japan during World War II when cotton and other woven materials were scarce. It was man-made, but unlike modern synthetic staple fibers, it was based on chemically treated wood pulp.

The manufacturing process was developed in Germany during World War I and was also mass-produced in Italy after the Second Italo-Ethiopian War and in Japan during World War II. The three countries commonly had shortages of cotton and wool yarn, and these countries produced over 90% of world production at one time.

It was an inexpensive, ersatz cloth made from wood fibers, basically cellulose (a kind of Rayon viscose), that started to disintegrate after three or four washings and was highly flammable. In general, the warp threads were of cotton yarn, and the weft consisted of twisted Sufu yarn.

At the time, the import of fabric materials, like cotton and wool, amounted to about a third of the total import amount into Japan. Hence, the reduction of this import was imperative to enable weapons and other wartime material purchases overseas. The Imperial Japanese government mandated at least 30% Sufu composition within cotton garment materials in December 1937.

Due to the improvements in the manufacturing process and the growing market for environmentally friendly bio-degradable garments, the production of Viscose Staple Fiber has been resurging in recent years.
