= Lesotho at the 2019 World Aquatics Championships =

- Flag of Ghana
- FINA code: LES
- National federation: Lesotho Swimmers Association

in Gwangju, South Korea
- Competitors: 3 in 1 sport
- Medals: Gold 0 Silver 0 Bronze 0 Total 0

World Aquatics Championships appearances
- 1973; 1975; 1978; 1982; 1986; 1991; 1994; 1998; 2001; 2003; 2005; 2007; 2009; 2011; 2013; 2015; 2017; 2019; 2022; 2023; 2024

Lesotho was scheduled to compete at the 2019 World Aquatics Championships in Gwangju, South Korea, from 12 to 28 July, but they withdrew.

== Swimming ==
Lesotho had entered three swimmers before withdrawing.

Men

Athlete	Event	Heat		Semifinal		Final	
Athlete	Event	Time	Rank	Time	Rank	Time	Rank
Refiloe Chopho	50 m breaststroke						
Refiloe Chopho	100 m breaststroke						
Motlatsi Mokala	50 m freestyle						
Motlatsi Mokala	50 m butterfly						

Women

Athlete	Event	Heat		Semifinal		Final	
Athlete	Event	Time	Rank	Time	Rank	Time	Rank
Makoena Chele	50 m freestyle						
