= Vehicle registration plates of Lesotho =

Kingdom of Lesotho
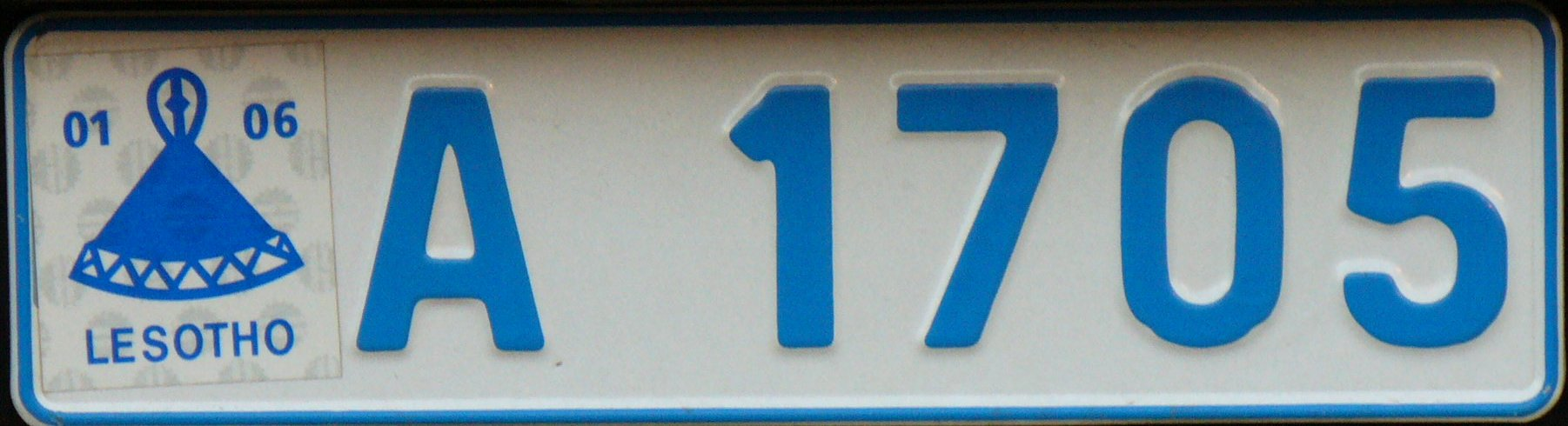
- Mosotho regular legal standard number plate.
- Country: Lesotho
- Country code: LS

Current series
- Serial format: A 1234
- Colour (front): Blue on white
- Colour (rear): Blue on white

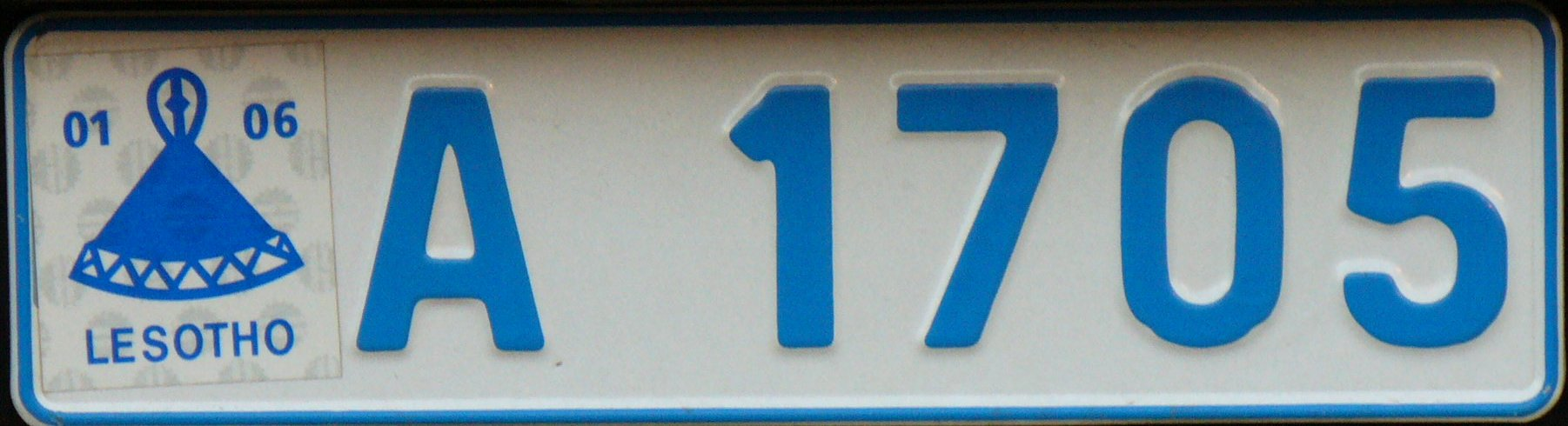
Lesotho number plate with the mokorotlo sticker

Lesotho requires its residents to register their motor vehicles and display vehicle registration plates.

Plates are blue-on-white for private vehicles and red-on-white for government vehicles. They follow the format of one or two letters followed by four numbers. Diplomatic Plates are blue-on-white however have the letters CD on them.

A 1234	A 1234
A 1234	A 1234

A mokorotlo, the same colour as the characters on the plate, is stuck onto the plate to show a 5-year validity period.

Dealer plates are also red-on-white but do not follow the A 1234 standard and do not show the mokorotlo.

Before 1979, private plates were white-on-black and had an additional preceding 'L' which stood for Lesotho.

LA 1234	LA 1234

== Kingdom of Lesotho ==
Period following independence:

- LA – Maseru
- LB – Butha Buthe
- LC – Leribe
- LD – Teyateyaneng
- LE – Mafeteng
- LF – Mohales Hoek
- LG – Quthing
- LH – Qacha's Nek
- LJ – Mokhotlong

Government:

- LX – Government vehicles

Diplomatic corps: Owing to a dispute between the foreign legations, several of them used distinctive codes for a period:

- UKHC – United Kingdom High Commission
- UNDP – United Nations Development Programme
- USA – United States of America
- WHO – World Health Organization
- ROC – Republic of China (Taiwan)
- D – Federal Republic of Germany (West Germany)

The rest of the legations used DC.

== Colony of Basutoland ==
Prior to independence:

- BA – Maseru
- BB – Butha Buthe
- BC – Leribe
- BD – Teyateyaneng
- BE – Mafeteng
- BF – Mohales Hoek
- BG – Quthing
- BH – Qacha's Nek
- BJ – Mokhotlong

Government:

- BX – Government vehicles
