= Flag of Lesotho =

Kingdom of Lesotho
- Proportion: 2:3
- Adopted: 4 October 2006; 20 years ago
- Design: A horizontal triband of blue, white and green in proportions 3:4:3; charged with a black mokorotlo (a Basotho hat) centred on the white band.
- Use: Royal Standard

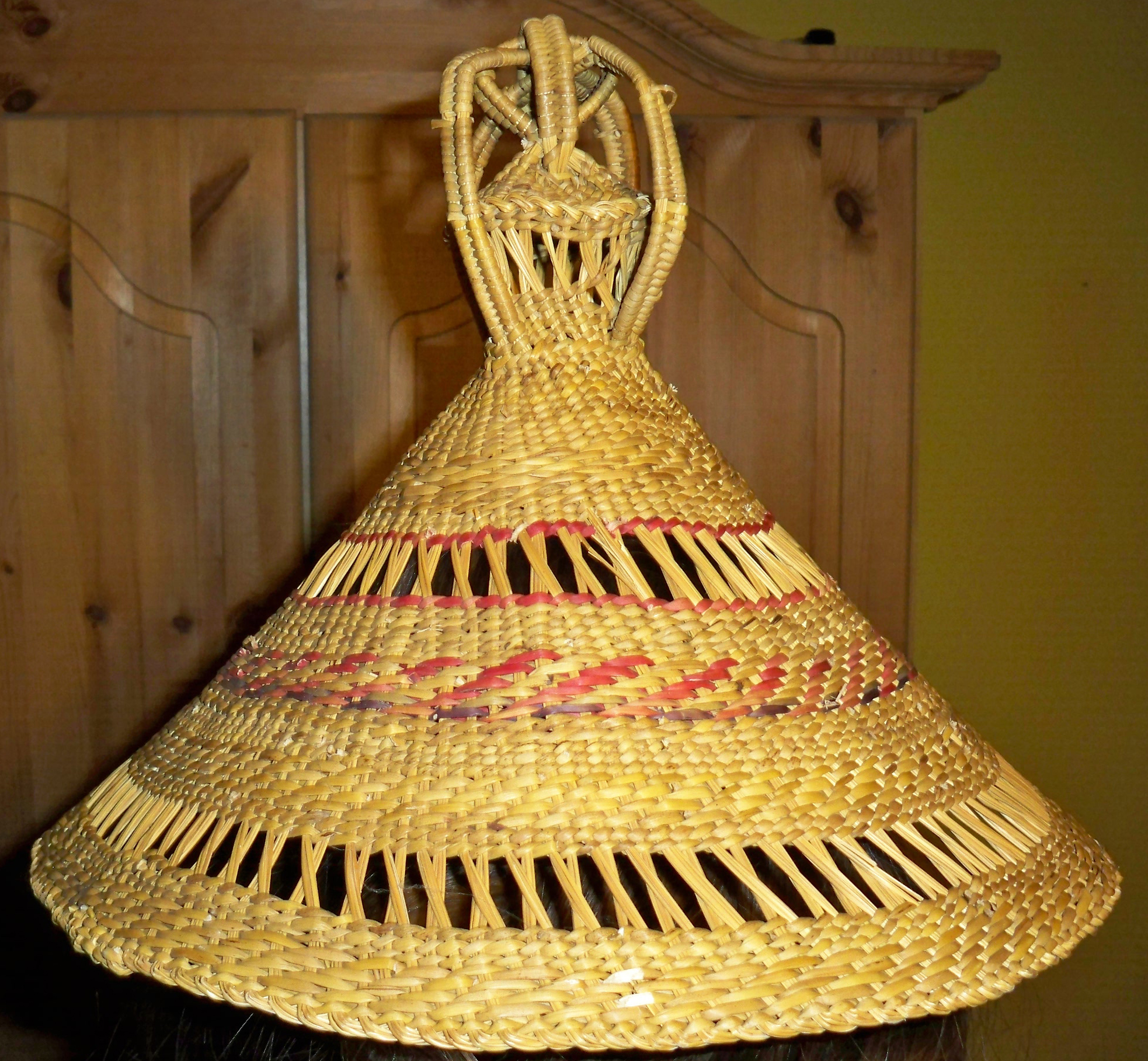
A mokorotlo is a type of straw hat widely used for traditional Sotho clothing

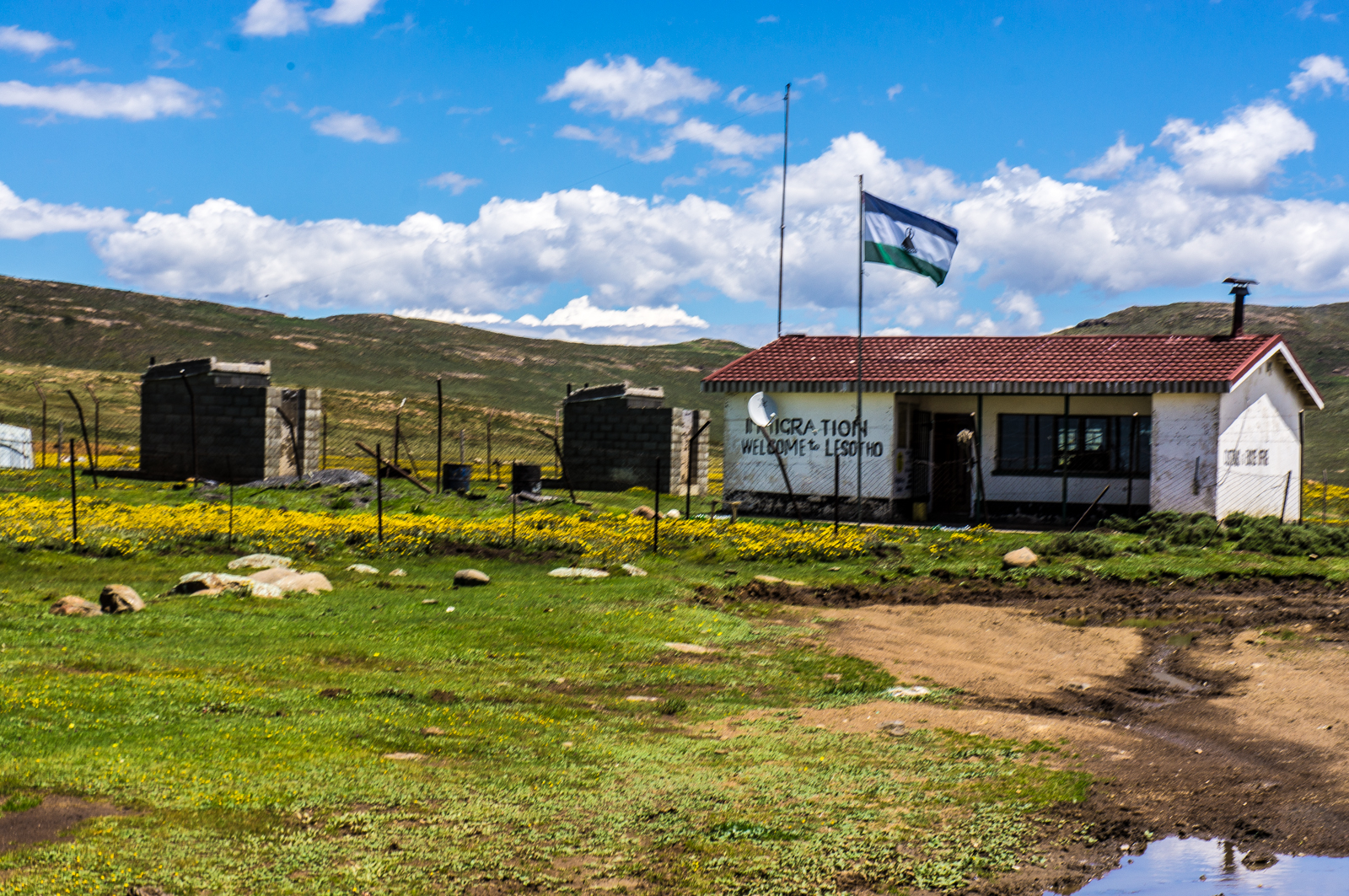
Lesotho flag at the Sani Pass border post

The mokorotlo hat in black, which appears on the flag of Lesotho

The flag of Lesotho, adopted on the 40th anniversary of Lesotho's independence on 4 October 2006, features a horizontal blue, white, and green tricolour with a black mokorotlo (a Basotho hat) in the center. The design is intended to reflect a state that is both at peace internally and with its only neighbour South Africa, replacing the old flag design that featured a military emblem of a shield, spear and knobkerrie.

== Colours ==
The symbolism of the colours is as such:

Colour	Meaning
Blue	Represents the sky or rain.
White	Represents peace. Lesotho has had the ideology of peace since the ages of King Moshoeshoe I.
Green	Represents prosperity.

Colors scheme	Blue	White	Green	Black
CMYK	100-87-0-20	0-0-0-0	92-0-97-0	0-0-0-100
HEX	#001489	#FFFFFF	#009A44	#000000
RGB	0-20-137	255-255-255	0-154-68	0-0-0

== Construction sheet ==
Construction sheet for the flag of Lesotho

== History ==
=== 1966–1987 ===
The first flag of Lesotho was introduced on 4 October 1966, the day of Lesotho's full independence from the United Kingdom. It featured a prominent white mokorotlo. The blue stood for sky and rain, the white for peace, the green for land, and the red for faith.

National flag from 1966–1987

Royal standard from 1966–1987

=== 1987–2006 ===
A new flag, designed by Sergeant Retšelisitsoe Matete, was adopted on 20 January 1987, following a military coup which ousted the Basotho National Party after 20 years in power. A light brown traditional Basotho shield along with an assegai (lance) and knobkierrie (club) replaced the mokorotlo as the primary emblem. The colour scheme and pattern changed as well, with a triangular white field standing for peace. The bottom diagonal contained a blue strip for rain and a green triangle for prosperity.

National flag from 1987–2006

Royal standard from 1987–2006

=== 2006–present ===
In 2006, a new flag was chosen from four proposed designs; all of these designs included a brown Basotho hat instead of the shield. This was subsequently changed to a black Basotho hat in order to represent Lesotho as a black nation. The bill changing the flag was approved by the National Assembly on 18 September 2006, with 84 members of parliament voting in favour of it, 18 against it, and two abstaining. It was subsequently approved by the Senate as well.

== Gallery ==
=== Historical flags ===
Union Jack served as the flag of Basutoland (1884–1966)

Unofficial flag of Basutoland (1951–1966)

Unofficial flag of Basutoland without circle (1951–1966)

Flag of the Resident Commissioner of Basutoland (1951–1966)

Coat of arms of Basutoland (1951–1966)

Incorrect variant of Royal Standard of Lesotho (1966–1987)

== See also ==
- Coat of arms of Lesotho
