= List of cities and towns in the Free State =

This is a list of cities and towns in Free State Province, South Africa.

In the case of settlements that have had their official names changed the traditional name is listed first followed by the new name.

== A ==
Town Name	District	Municipality
Allanridge	Lejweleputswa	Matjhabeng
Arlington	Thabo Mofutsanyana	Nketoana

== B ==
Town Name	District	Municipality
Bethlehem	Thabo Mofutsanyana	Dihlabeng
Bethulie	Xhariep	Kopanong
Bloemfontein	Mangaung Metro	Mangaung
Boshof	Lejweleputswa	Tokologo
Bothaville	Lejweleputswa	Nala
Botshabelo	Mangaung Metro	Mangaung
Brandfort	Lejweleputswa	Masilonyana
Bultfontein	Lejweleputswa	Tswelopele

== C ==
Town Name	District	Municipality
Clarens	Thabo Mofutsanyana	Dihlabeng
Clocolan	Thabo Mofutsanyana	Setsoto
Cornelia	Fezile Dabi	Mafube

== D ==
Town Name	District	Municipality
Dealesville	Lejweleputswa	Tokologo
Deneysville	Fezile Dabi	Metsimaholo
Dewetsdorp	Mangaung Metro	Mangaung

== E ==
Town Name	District	Municipality
Edenburg	Xhariep	Kopanong
Edenville	Fezile Dabi	Ngwathe
Excelsior	Thabo Mofutsanyana	Mantsopa

== F ==
Town Name	District	Municipality
Fauresmith	Xhariep	Letsemeng
Ficksburg	Thabo Mofutsanyana	Setsoto
Fouriesburg	Thabo Mofutsanyana	Dihlabeng
Frankfort	Fezile Dabi	Mafube

== H ==
Town Name	District	Municipality
Harrismith	Thabo Mofutsanyana	Maluti-a-Phofung
Heilbron	Fezile Dabi	Ngwathe
Hennenman	Lejweleputswa	Matjhabeng
Hertzogville	Lejweleputswa	Tokologo
Hobhouse	Thabo Mofutsanyana	Mantsopa
Hoopstad	Lejweleputswa	Tswelopele

== J ==
Town Name	District	Municipality
Jacobsdal	Xhariep	Letsemeng
Jagersfontein	Xhariep	Kopanong

== K ==
Town Name	District	Municipality
Kestell	Thabo Mofutsanyana	Maluti-a-Phofung
Koffiefontein	Xhariep	Letsemeng
Koppies	Fezile Dabi	Ngwathe
Kroonstad	Fezile Dabi	Moqhaka

== L ==
Town Name	District	Municipality
Ladybrand	Thabo Mofutsanyana	Mantsopa
Lindley	Thabo Mofutsanyana	Nketoana
Luckhoff	Xhariep	Letsemeng

== M ==
Town Name	District	Municipality
Marquard	Thabo Mofutsanyana	Setsoto
Memel	Thabo Mofutsanyana	Phumelela

== O ==
Town Name	District	Municipality
Odendaalsrus	Lejweleputswa	Matjhabeng
Oranjeville	Fezile Dabi	Metsimaholo

== P ==
Town Name	District	Municipality	Remarks / New Name
Parys	Fezile Dabi	Ngwathe	
Paul Roux	Thabo Mofutsanyana	Dihlabeng	
Petrusburg	Xhariep	Letsemeng	
Petrus Steyn	Thabo Mofutsanyana	Nketoana	Mamafubedu
Philippolis	Xhariep	Kopanong	
Phuthaditjhaba	Thabo Mofutsanyana	Maluti-a-Phofung	Formely Witsieshoek

== R ==
Town Name	District	Municipality
Reddersburg	Xhariep	Kopanong
Reitz	Thabo Mofutsanyana	Nketoana
Rosendal	Thabo Mofutsanyana	Dihlabeng
Rouxville	Xhariep	Mohokare

== S ==
Town Name	District	Municipality
Sasolburg	Fezile Dabi	Metsimaholo
Senekal	Thabo Mofutsanyana	Setsoto
Smithfield	Xhariep	Mohokare
Springfontein	Xhariep	Kopanong
Steynsrus	Fezile Dabi	Moqhaka
Swinburne	Thabo Mofutsanyana	Maluti-a-Phofung

== T ==
Town Name	District	Municipality
Thaba 'Nchu	Mangaung Metro	Mangaung
Theunissen	Lejweleputswa	Masilonyana
Trompsburg	Xhariep	Kopanong
Tweeling	Fezile Dabi	Mafube
Tweespruit	Thabo Mofutsanyana	Mantsopa

== V ==
Town Name	District	Municipality
Van Reenen	Thabo Mofutsanyana	Maluti-a-Phofung
Van Stadensrus	Mangaung Metro	Mangaung
Ventersburg	Lejweleputswa	Matjhabeng
Verkeerdevlei	Lejweleputswa	Masilonyana
Viljoenskroon	Fezile Dabi	Moqhaka
Villiers	Fezile Dabi	Mafube
Virginia	Lejweleputswa	Matjhabeng
Vrede	Thabo Mofutsanyana	Phumelela
Vredefort	Fezile Dabi	Ngwathe

== W ==
Town Name	District	Municipality
Warden	Thabo Mofutsanyana	Phumelela
Welkom	Lejweleputswa	Matjhabeng
Wepener	Mangaung Metro	Mangaung
Wesselsbron	Lejweleputswa	Nala
Winburg	Lejweleputswa	Masilonyana

== Z ==
Town Name	District	Municipality
Zastron	Xhariep	Mohokare
