= List of places in South Africa named after people =

There are many places in South Africa named after people.

== Western Cape ==
Place Name	Named After
Albertinia	Johannes Rudolph Albertyn
Athlone	Alexander Cambridge, 1st Earl of Athlone
Beaufort West	Henry Somerset, 5th Duke of Beaufort
Bellville	Charles Davidson Bell
Bredasdorp	Michiel van Breda
Caledon	Du Pré Alexander, 2nd Earl of Caledon
Calitzdorp	Calitz family
Camps Bay	Friedrich von Kamptz
Clanwilliam	John Meade, 1st Earl of Clanwilliam
Darling	Charles Henry Darling, lieutenant-governor of Cape Colony
Durbanville	Sir Benjamin d'Urban
George	King George III of the United Kingdom
Gordon's Bay	Robert Jacob Gordon
Hermanus	Hermanus Pieters
Hopefield	Col William Hope and William Field
Ladismith	Lady Smith, wife of Sir Harry Smith
Laingsburg	John Laing
Lamberts Bay	Admiral Sir Robert Lambert
Maitland, Cape Town	Sir Peregrine Maitland, governor of Cape Colony
Malmesbury	James Harris, 1st Earl of Malmesbury
McGregor	Rev Andrew McGregor
Milnerton	Sir Alfred Milner
Montagu	John Montagu
Moorreesburg	Rev Johannes Moorrees
Murraysburg	Reverend Andrew Murray Snr
Napier	Sir George Napier, governor of Cape Colony
Oudtshoorn	Baron Pieter van Reede van Oudtshoorn, governor of Cape Colony
Parow	Johann Heinrich Parow
Plettenberg Bay	Baron Joachim van Plettenberg, governor of Cape Colony
Porterville	William Porter, attorney-general of Cape Colony
Prince Albert	Prince Albert of Saxe-Coburg and Gotha, Queen Victoria's Husband
Prince Alfred Hamlet	The Prince Alfred, second son of Queen Victoria
Riebeeck Kasteel	Jan van Riebeeck
Riebeeck West	Jan van Riebeeck
Riversdale	Harry Rivers
Robertson	Rev Dr William Robertson
Saldanha	Antonio de Saldanha
Simon's Town	Simon van der Stel
Somerset West	Lord Charles Henry Somerset, governor of Cape Colony
Stellenbosch	Simon van der Stel, governor of Cape Colony
Swellendam	Hendrik Swellengrebel and his wife Helena Ten Damme
Tulbagh	Ryk Tulbagh, governor of Cape Colony
Vanrhynsdorp	Petrus Benjamin van Rhyn
Wellington	Duke of Wellington
Wolseley	Viscount Wolseley
Worcester	Henry Somerset, 6th Duke of Beaufort

== Eastern Cape ==
Place Name	Named After
Adelaide	Adelaide of Saxe-Meiningen
Alexandria	Rev Alexander Smit
Alfred Nzo District Municipality	Alfred Baphethuxolo Nzo
Alice	Princess Alice, second daughter of Queen Victoria
Aliwal North	Sir Harry Smith, 1st Baronet of Aliwal
Balfour, Eastern Cape	Robert Balfour, secretary of the Glasgow Missionary Society
Barkly East	Sir Henry Barkly
Bedford	Duke of Bedford
Butterworth	Joseph Butterworth
Chris Hani District Municipality	Chris Hani
Cradock	John Cradock, 1st Baron Howden
Dias Division	Bartolommeo Dias
Elliot	Henry George Elliot
Fort Beaufort	Henry Somerset, 5th Duke of Beaufort
Graaff-Reinet	Cornelis van der Graaff and his wife Hester Reynet
Grahamstown	John Graham
Humansdorp	Johannes J. Human and Matthys G. Human
Jansenville	Jan Willem Janssens
Joe Gqabi District Municipality	Joe Nzingo Gqabi
Joubertina	Rev W. A. Joubert
King William's Town	King William IV
Kirkwood	James Somers Kirkwood
Lady Grey	Lady Eliza Lucy Grey
Maclear	Thomas Maclear
Nelson Mandela Bay Metropolitan Municipality	Nelson Mandela
OR Tambo District Municipality	Oliver Tambo
Philipstown	Sir Philip Wodehouse, governor of Cape Colony
Port Alfred	The Prince Alfred, second son of Queen Victoria
Port Elizabeth	Elizabeth Donkin, the wife of Sir Rufane Shaw Donkin
Queenstown	Queen Victoria
Richmond	Duke of Richmond
Sarah Baartman District Municipality	Sarah Baartman
Seymour	Colonel Seymour
Somerset East	Lord Charles Somerset, governor of Cape Colony
Steynsburg	Andries Steyn
Steytlerville	Abraham Isaac Steytler
Stutterheim	Baron von Stutterheim
Uitenhage	Jacob Uitenhage de Mist

== Northern Cape ==
Place Name	Named After
Barkly West	Sir Henry Barkly
Calvinia	John Calvin, from its church dedicated to him
Carnarvon	Henry Herbert, 4th Earl of Carnarvon
Cathcart	Sir George Cathcart
Colesberg	Sir Galbraith Lowry Cole
Douglas	Lieutenant-General Sir Percy Douglas
Frances Baard District Municipality	Frances Baard
Jan Kempdorp	Gen Jan Kemp
John Taolo Gaetsewe District Municipality	John Taolo Gaetsewe
Kimberley	John Wodehouse, 1st Earl of Kimberley
Loxton	A.E. Loxton
Molteno	John Charles Molteno, first prime minister of Cape Colony
Port Nolloth	Captain M. S. Nolloth
Pixley ka Seme District Municipality	Dr. Pixley ka Isaka Seme, one of the founders of African National Congress
Reivilo	Rev A.J. Olivier
Sutherland	Henry Sutherland, pastor who established the church around which the settlement grew
Upington	Thomas Upington
Victoria West	Queen Victoria
Warrenton	Sir Charles Warren
Williston	Colonel Willis
ZF Mgcawu District Municipality	Z. F. Mgcawu

== Free State ==
Place Name	Named After
Allanridge	Allan Roberts
Brandfort	Johannes Brand, state president of the Orange Free State
Cornelia	Cornelia Mulder, wife of Francis William Reitz, president of the Orange Free State
Dealesville	John Henry Deale
Deneysville	Deneys Reitz
Dewetsdorp	Jacobus de Wet, father of General Christiaan de Wet
Fauresmith	Reverend Phillip Faure and Sir Harry Smith, 1st Baronet
Fezile Dabi District Municipality	Fezile Abram Dabi
Harrismith	Sir Harry Smith, 1st Baronet
Hennenman	P.F. Hennenman
Hertzogville	James Barry Munnik Hertzog
Hobhouse	Emily Hobhouse
Kestell	Rev Dr J.D. Kestell
Lindley	Rev Daniel Lindley
Paul Roux	Dr Paul Roux
Philippolis	Rev Dr John Philip
Rouxville	Rev Pieter Roux
Thabo Mofutsanyana District Municipality	Thabo Edwin Mofutsanyana
Viljoenskroon	Hans Viljoen and his horse 'Kroon'
Villiers	Lourens de Villiers
Warden	Charles Warden, administrator of the Orange River Sovereignty
Zastron	Johanns Sibella Zastron, wife of president Johannes Brand

== Gauteng ==
Place Name	Named After
Alexandra	Alexandra Papenfus (wife of farmer)
Benoni	the original name of the Biblical Benjamin
Boksburg	W.E. Bok, state secretary of the South African Republic
Carletonville	Guy Carleton Jones
Johannesburg	Johannes Rissik; Johannes Meyer
Krugersdorp	Paul Kruger
Pretoria	Andries Pretorius
Sharpeville	John Sharpe
Vanderbijlpark	Hendrik van der Bijl

== KwaZulu-Natal ==
Place Name	Named After
Cato Ridge	George Christopher Cato, the first mayor of Durban
Colenso	Bishop John Colenso
Durban	Sir Benjamin d'Urban
Estcourt	Thomas Estcourt
Greytown	George Edward Grey
Harry Gwala District Municipality	Harry Gwala
Hibberdene	C. Maxwell-Hibberd
King Cetshwayo District Municipality	Cetshwayo kaMpande
La Lucia	Lucia Michel
Ladysmith	Lady Smith, wife of Sir Harry Smith
Melmoth	Sir Melmoth Osborne, governor of Zululand
Newcastle	Duke of Newcastle
Paulpietersburg	Paul Kruger and Petrus Jacobus Joubert
Pietermaritzburg	Two theories exist.: In the theory officially accepted today by the city, it bears the name of Voortrekker leaders Piet Retief and Gert Maritz.; In another theory, the city was originally named after Retief alone, initially "Pieter Mouriets Burg" (after his given names) and transformed to its current form.
Pinetown	Sir Benjamin Pine, governor of Natal
Port Edward	Edward VIII
Port Shepstone	Theophilus Shepstone
Richard's Bay	Frederick Richards
Scottburgh	John Scott, lieutenant-governor of Natal
Westville	Martin West, the first British lieutenant-governor of Natal

== Limpopo ==
Place Name	Named After
Louis Trichardt	Louis Tregardt

== Mpumalanga ==
Place Name	Named After
Balfour	Arthur James Balfour
Barberton	Harry and Fred Barber, pioneer gold prospectors
Breyten	Nicolaas Breytenbach
Carolina	Carolina Coetzee, wife of the owner of the land on which the town was developed
Evander	Evelyn Anderson
Gert Sibande District Municipality	ANC activist Gert Sibande
Groblersdal	W.J. Grobler
Machadodorp	General Jose Machado
Nelspruit	Andries, Gert and Louis Nel
Piet Retief	Piet Retief
Standerton	A.J. Stander, owner of the farm on which the town was developed
Trichardt	Carolus Johannes Trichardt, son of Louis Trichardt

== North West ==
Place Name	Named After
Brits	Gert Brits, owner of the farm on which the town was developed
Christiana	Christiana Pretorius, daughter of president Marthinus Wessel Pretorius
Coligny	Admiral Gaspard II de Coligny
Delareyville	General Jacobus de la Rey
Dr Kenneth Kaunda District Municipality	Kenneth Kaunda, First President of Zambia
Dr Ruth Segomotsi Mompati District Municipality	Ruth Mompati
Klerksdorp	Jacob de Clerq
Ngaka Modiri Molema District Municipality	Dr Silas Molema
Potchefstroom	the first syllable comes from the town's founder Andries Hendrik Potgieter
Schweizer Reneke	Captain Schweizer and Field Cornet Reneke
Ventersdorp	Johannes Venter, owner of the farm on which the town was developed
Wolmaransstad	J.M.A. Wolmarans
Zeerust	Diederick Coetzee (the town was originally named 'Coetzee-Rust')

== Former ==
Former Name	Current Name	Named After
Ellisras (Limpopo)	Lephalale	Patrick Ellis and Piet Erasmus (farm owners)
Pietersburg (Limpopo)	Polokwane	Petrus Jacobus Joubert
Potgietersrus (Limpopo)	Mokopane	Piet Potgieter
Stanger (KwaZulu-Natal)	KwaDukuza	William Stanger (Surveyor-General of Natal)
Verwoerdburg (Gauteng)	Centurion	Hendrik Verwoerd
