= Ngwathe Local Municipality elections =

Local elections in the Free State, South Africa

The Ngwathe Local Municipality council (within the South African Fezile Dabi District Municipality) consists of thirty-seven members elected by mixed-member proportional representation. Nineteen councillors are elected by first-past-the-post voting in nineteen wards, while the remaining eighteen are chosen from party lists so that the total number of party representatives is proportional to the number of votes received.

In the election of 3 August 2016 the African National Congress (ANC) won a majority of twenty-four seats on the council.

In the election of 1 November 2021 the ANC won a reduced majority of twenty-one seats.

In the election of 4 November 2026 the ANC lost its majority, but remained the largest party, with ten seats on the council.

== Results ==
The following table shows the composition of the council after past elections.

Event	ANC	DA	EFF	FF+	PAC	Other	Total
2000 election	26	8	—	—	1	1	36
2006 election	30	5	—	1	1	1	38
2011 election	28	9	—	1	0	1	39
2016 election	24	8	3	1	—	1	36
2021 election	21	7	5	3	—	1	37
2026 election	10	8	2	2	0	5	27

== December 2000 election ==
The following table shows the results of the 2000 election.

Party	Ward			List			Total seats
Party	Votes	%	Seats	Votes	%	Seats	Total seats
African National Congress	20,632	71.77	15	20,474	71.21	11	26
Democratic Alliance	6,480	22.54	3	6,461	22.47	5	8
Alliance 2000+	866	3.01	0	860	2.99	1	1
Pan Africanist Congress of Azania	593	2.06	0	594	2.07	1	1
United Democratic Movement	142	0.49	0	209	0.73	0	0
Inkatha Freedom Party				153	0.53	0	0
Independent candidates	35	0.12	0				0
Total	28,748	100.00	18	28,751	100.00	18	36
Valid votes	28,748	98.16		28,751	98.10		
Invalid/blank votes	538	1.84		558	1.90		
Total votes	29,286	100.00		29,309	100.00		
Registered voters/turnout	58,418	50.13		58,418	50.17		

== March 2006 election ==
The following table shows the results of the 2006 election.

Party	Ward			List			Total seats
Party	Votes	%	Seats	Votes	%	Seats	Total seats
African National Congress	23,642	77.41	17	23,504	77.44	13	30
Democratic Alliance	3,875	12.69	2	3,833	12.63	3	5
Pan Africanist Congress of Azania	1,156	3.79	0	1,029	3.39	1	1
Freedom Front Plus	1,043	3.42	0	1,025	3.38	1	1
Belastingbetalersverening van Parys	706	2.31	0	731	2.41	1	1
United Democratic Movement	80	0.26	0	231	0.76	0	0
Independent candidates	38	0.12	0				0
Total	30,540	100.00	19	30,353	100.00	19	38
Valid votes	30,540	98.27		30,353	98.07		
Invalid/blank votes	538	1.73		597	1.93		
Total votes	31,078	100.00		30,950	100.00		
Registered voters/turnout	62,766	49.51		62,766	49.31		

== May 2011 election ==
The following table shows the results of the 2011 election.

Party	Ward			List			Total seats
Party	Votes	%	Seats	Votes	%	Seats	Total seats
African National Congress	26,581	71.99	18	26,603	71.68	10	28
Democratic Alliance	8,283	22.43	2	8,081	21.77	7	9
Freedom Front Plus	1,130	3.06	0	959	2.58	1	1
Congress of the People	327	0.89	0	971	2.62	1	1
Pan Africanist Congress of Azania	279	0.76	0	182	0.49	0	0
Belastingbetalersverening van Parys	257	0.70	0	87	0.23	0	0
African People's Convention	66	0.18	0	231	0.62	0	0
Total	36,923	100.00	20	37,114	100.00	19	39
Valid votes	36,923	98.39		37,114	98.84		
Invalid/blank votes	604	1.61		436	1.16		
Total votes	37,527	100.00		37,550	100.00		
Registered voters/turnout	64,316	58.35		64,316	58.38		

== August 2016 election ==
The following table shows the results of the 2016 election.

Party	Ward			List			Total seats
Party	Votes	%	Seats	Votes	%	Seats	Total seats
African National Congress	25,714	65.49	17	25,555	64.99	7	24
Democratic Alliance	8,988	22.89	1	8,732	22.21	7	8
Economic Freedom Fighters	2,635	6.71	0	3,248	8.26	3	3
Freedom Front Plus	1,260	3.21	0	1,192	3.03	1	1
Congress of the People	409	1.04	0	451	1.15	0	0
African Christian Democratic Party	132	0.34	0	144	0.37	0	0
Independent candidates	129	0.33	0				0
Total	39,267	100.00	18	39,322	100.00	18	36
Valid votes	39,267	98.55		39,322	98.58		
Invalid/blank votes	577	1.45		567	1.42		
Total votes	39,844	100.00		39,889	100.00		
Registered voters/turnout	67,877	58.70		67,877	58.77		

== November 2021 election ==
The following table shows the results of the 2021 election.

Party	Ward			List			Total seats
Party	Votes	%	Seats	Votes	%	Seats	Total seats
African National Congress	15,913	55.51	18	16,020	55.80	3	21
Democratic Alliance	5,489	19.15	1	5,532	19.27	6	7
Economic Freedom Fighters	3,764	13.13	0	3,913	13.63	5	5
Freedom Front Plus	1,829	6.38	0	1,832	6.38	3	3
Ngwathe Residents Association	751	2.62	0	738	2.57	1	1
African Christian Democratic Party	210	0.73	0	220	0.77	0	0
Independent candidates	412	1.44	0				0
African Transformation Movement	127	0.44	0	141	0.49	0	0
Patriotic Alliance	74	0.26	0	105	0.37	0	0
United Independent Movement	45	0.16	0	55	0.19	0	0
Activists Movement of South Africa	42	0.15	0	35	0.12	0	0
Inkatha Freedom Party	0	0.00	0	68	0.24	0	0
Forum for Service Delivery	9	0.03	0	52	0.18	0	0
Total	28,665	100.00	19	28,711	100.00	18	37
Valid votes	28,665	98.27		28,711	98.20		
Invalid/blank votes	506	1.73		526	1.80		
Total votes	29,171	100.00		29,237	100.00		
Registered voters/turnout	63,783	45.73		63,783	45.84		

=== By-elections from November 2021 ===
The following by-elections were held to fill vacant ward seats in the period since November 2021.

Date	Ward	Party of the previous councillor	Party of the newly elected councillor
28 Aug 2024	7	African National Congress	African National Congress
28 May 2025	16	African National Congress	African National Congress

== November 2026 election ==
The following table shows the results of the 2026 election.

Party	Ward			List			Total seats
Party	Votes	%	Seats	Votes	%	Seats	Total seats
African National Congress	10,046	36.30	10	9,897	35.72	0	10
Democratic Alliance	7,777	28.10	3	7,877	28.43	5	8
African Congress for Transformation	4,150	14.99	1	4,275	15.43	3	4
Freedom Front Plus	2,188	7.91	0	2,198	7.93	2	2
Economic Freedom Fighters	1,739	6.28	0	1,752	6.32	2	2
South African Communist Party	872	3.15	0	896	3.23	1	1
Patriotic Alliance	179	0.65	0	179	0.65	0	0
United Development Forum	159	0.57	0	157	0.57	0	0
African Transformation Movement	107	0.39	0	146	0.53	0	0
Active African Christians United Movement	110	0.40	0	117	0.42	0	0
uMkhonto weSizwe Party	158	0.57	0				0
African People's Convention	64	0.23	0	57	0.21	0	0
Afrika Mayibuye Movement	54	0.20	0	65	0.23	0	0
Aaron	28	0.10	0	35	0.13	0	0
Pan Africanist Congress of Azania	15	0.05	0	47	0.17	0	0
Fezile Dabi Civic Movement	19	0.07	0	11	0.04	0	0
Civic Movement for Progressive Citizens	13	0.05	0				0
Total	27,678	100.00	14	27,709	100.00	13	27
Valid votes	27,678	98.12		27,709	97.96		
Invalid/blank votes	530	1.88		578	2.04		
Total votes	28,208	100.00		28,287	100.00		
Registered voters/turnout	52,187	54.05		52,187	54.20		
