= Vierfontein =

- Location within Free State (South African province) Location within South Africa
- Coordinates: 27.097°S 26.776°E
- Country: South Africa
- Province: Free State
- District: Fezile Dabi
- Municipality: Moqhaka

Area
  - Total: 8.21 km^{2} (3.17 sq mi)

Population (2011)
  - Total: 825
  - Density: 100/km^{2} (260/sq mi)

Racial makeup (2011)
  - Black African: 20.1%
  - Coloured: 0.1%
  - White: 79.6%
  - Other: 0.1%

First languages (2011)
  - Afrikaans: 75.2%
  - Sotho: 16.1%
  - English: 4.7%
  - Tswana: 2.1%
  - Other: 1.9%
- Time zone: UTC+2 (SAST)
- Postal code (street): 2615
- PO box: 2615
- Area code: 018

Vierfontein is a settlement in Fezile Dabi District Municipality in the Free State province of South Africa. Vierfontein is a coal-mining village, formerly associated to the Vierfontein Power Station, which was active from 1953 to 1990. When the power station was decommissioned, the village was sold to a property developer. The abandoned fuel station was used in the film "Orkney snork nie".

Directly translated to English from Afrikaans, the name literally means "four fountains".
