= Frankfort, Free State =

Frankfort
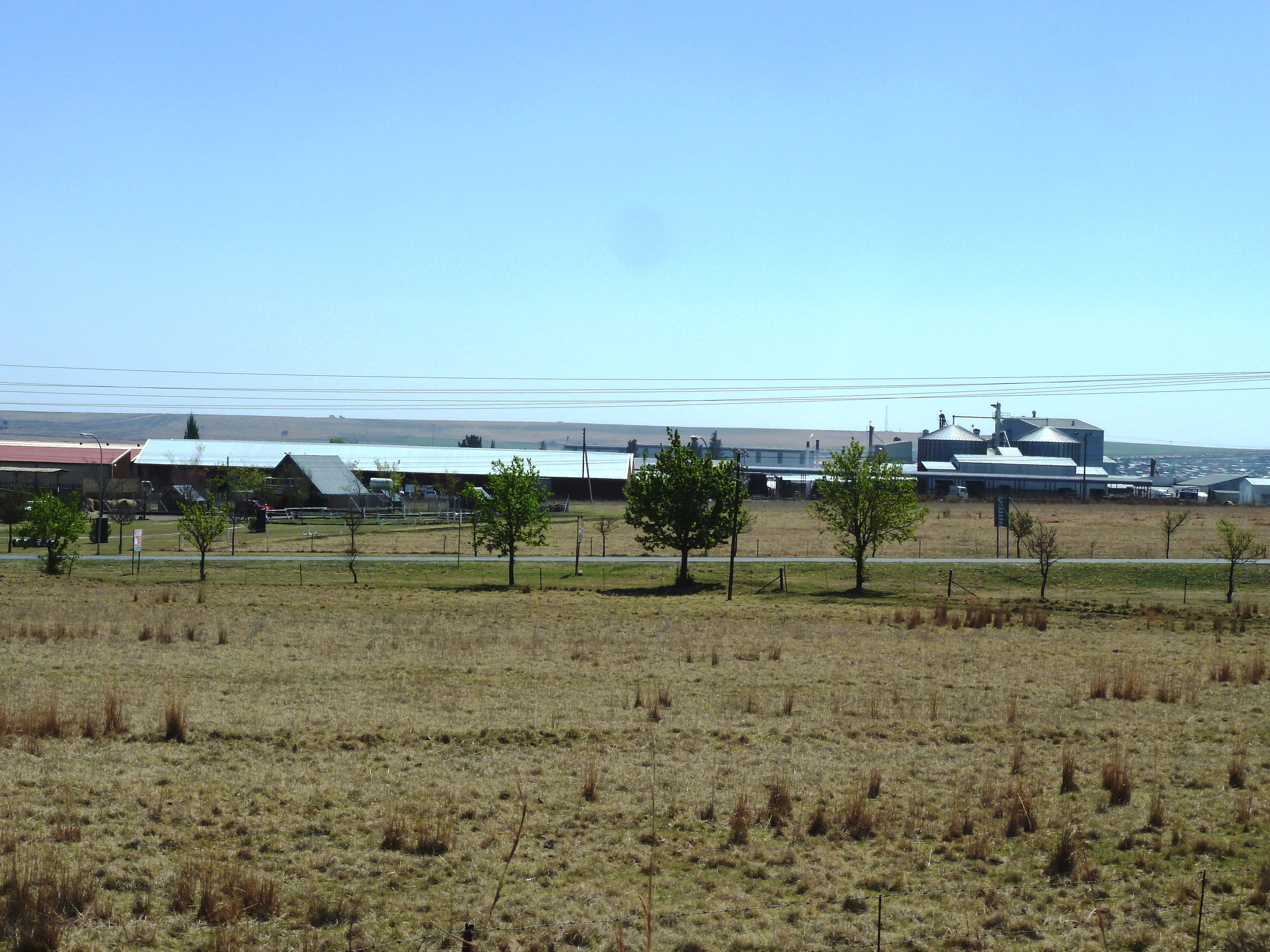
- Industrial buildings in Frankfort

- Location within Free State (South African province) Location within South Africa
- Coordinates: 27°17′S 28°31′E
- Country: South Africa
- Province: Free State
- District: Fezile Dabi
- Municipality: Mafube
- Established: 1878

Area
  - Total: 20.9 km^{2} (8.1 sq mi)
- Elevation: 1,530 m (5,020 ft)

Population (2011)
  - Total: 26,144
  - Density: 1,250/km^{2} (3,240/sq mi)

Racial makeup (2011)
  - Black African: 91.0%
  - Coloured: 0.5%
  - Indian/Asian: 0.2%
  - White: 8.2%
  - Other: 0.2%

First languages (2011)
  - Sotho: 61.8%
  - Zulu: 22.3%
  - Afrikaans: 9.0%
  - Xhosa: 1.9%
  - Other: 5.0%
- Time zone: UTC+2 (SAST)
- Postal code (street): 9830
- PO box: 9830
- Area code: 058

Frankfort is a small farming town situated on the banks of the Wilge River in the Free State province of South Africa. The town was laid out in 1869 on the farm Roodepoort, and named Frankfurt (after Frankfurt-am-Main in Germany) by Albert van Gordon. The town later received municipality status in 1896.

Frankfort is now the capital town to Villiers, Cornelia and Tweeling, called the Mafube Municipality. The main street is 'Brand Street', named after the 4th president of the Orange Free State, Sir Johannes Brand. (The name has since changed to J.J Hadebe.) Sir Johannes Brand visited the town during 1883 and laid the cornerstone of the Dutch Reformed Church. This church was burnt down by the British troops during the Second Boer War (1899–1902). After the war the church was rebuilt and inaugurated in 1918. The Second Boer War was disastrous for the town; according to one contemporary source there were ′not a house or tree′ remaining after the destruction.

== Namahadi township ==
Namahadi is a township named after the river that runs next to the town by Basotho, also known as Wilge River by Afrikaans speaking people because of the massive Willow trees on the banks of the river.

== Sports history ==
This town has produced notable soccer players like Paul Motaung (former Kaizer Chiefs defender) and Chris Motaung (former Swallows midfielder), Thabo Motsoeneng (former Bloemfontein Celtics player) other professional football players including Thomas Mofokeng, Ernest Nkosi and Dlangamandla. Frederich Lombaard, a former Cheetah and Springbok rugby player, and academics like Professor M.J. Lenake and Dr Mahlathini Tshabalala, who is now based in Gauteng and the renowned Motloung brothers Paul and Michael who are based in Botshabelo and Bloemfontein respectively. Mamontha Modise and Sophie Mokoena are former Lesedi FM anchors. The first black Comrades Marathon winner, Mr Tshabalala, also comes from this town. Lungisani Ndlela also hails from this town, he is a former South African Football Association striker for Premier Soccer League club Moroka Swallow and the South African national soccer team. The famed professional hunter, Harry Selby, was born here, although he was mainly based elsewhere for the rest of his life.

== Power generation ==
Various solar power facilities around the town are owned by farmers, businesses and town residents. Their combined power production is distributed by Rural Maintenance, a utility which concluded a 25 year contract for power distribution on behalf of the Mafube Municipality. Rural's competitive advantage during daylight hours has led to legal wrangles with Eskom.
