= Vredefort =

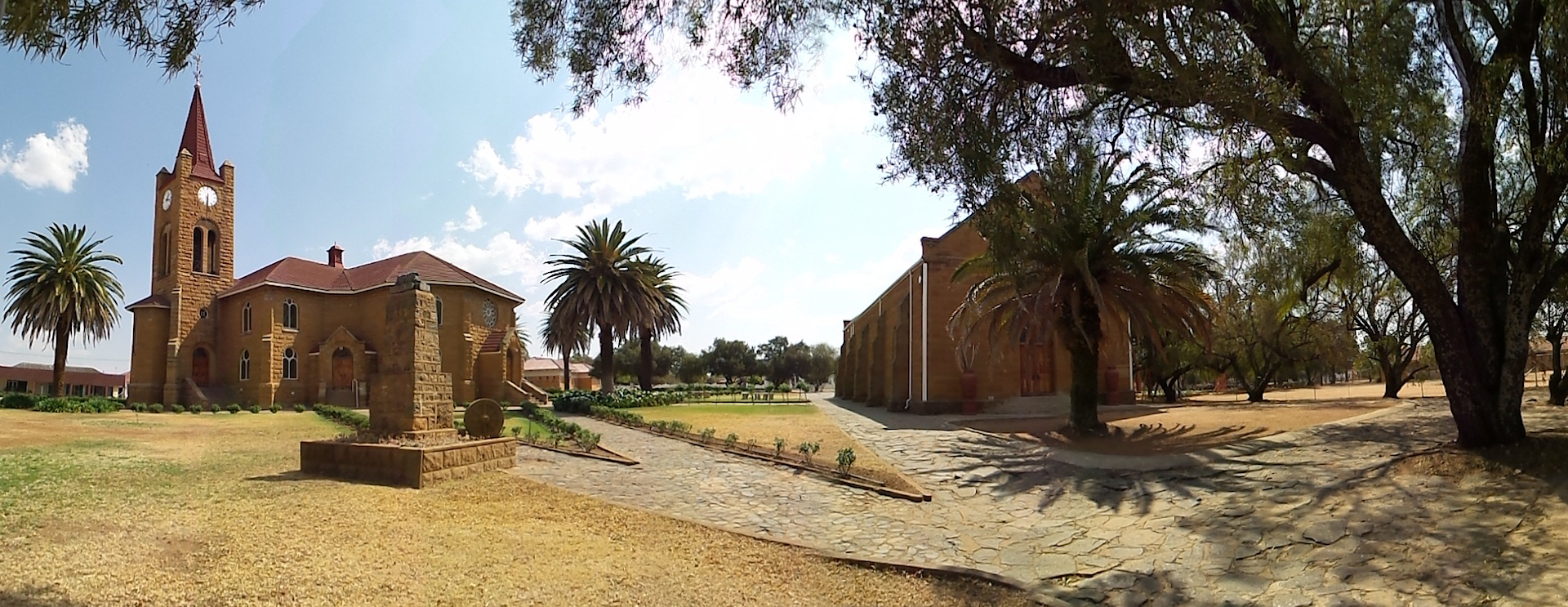
- Nederduitse Gereformeerde Church, Church Street, Vredefort

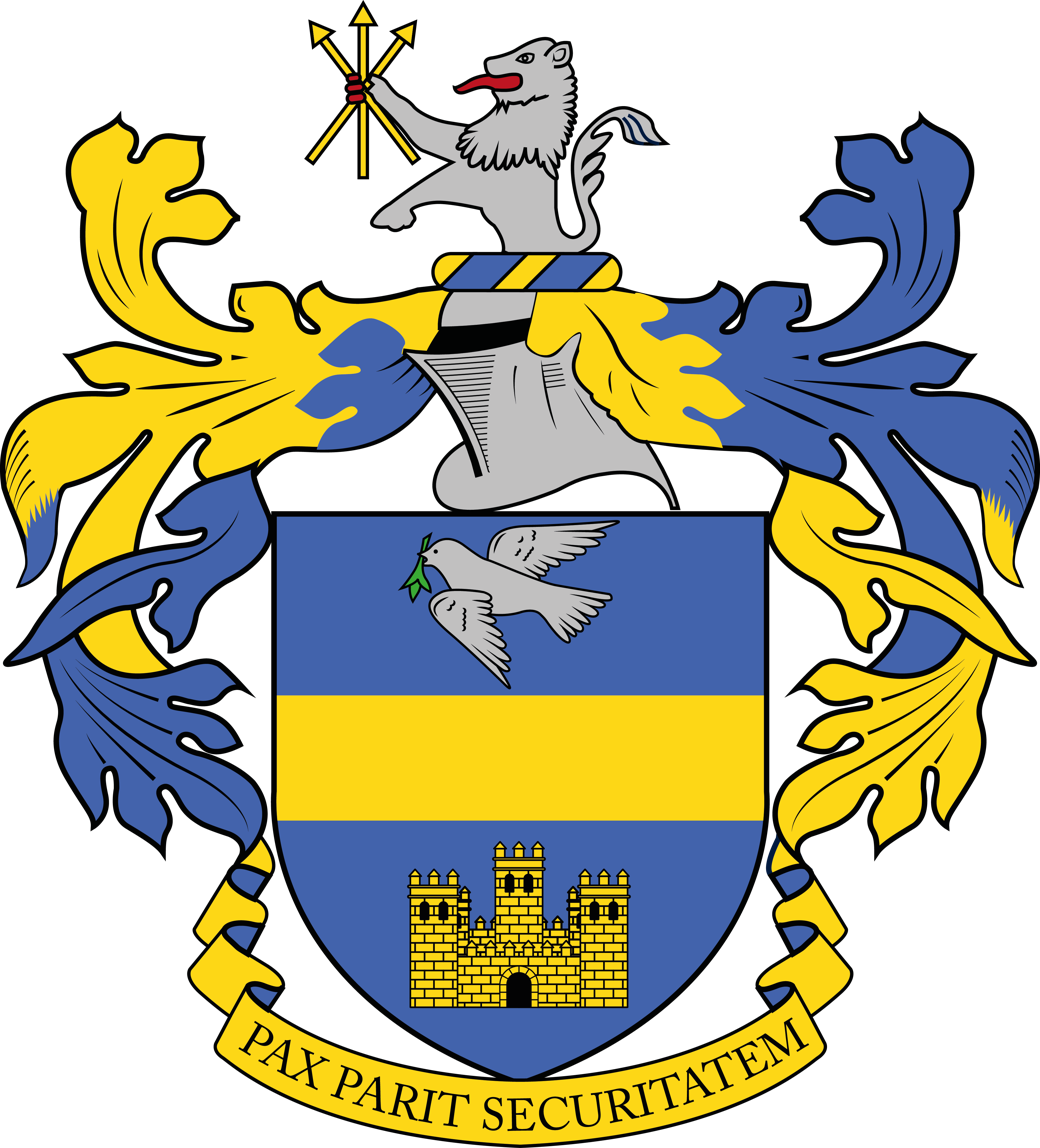
- Coat of arms

- Location within Free State (South African province) Location within South Africa
- Coordinates: 27°01′S 27°23′E
- Country: South Africa
- Province: Free State
- District: Fezile Dabi
- Municipality: Ngwathe
- Established: 1878

Area
  - Total: 21.4 km^{2} (8.3 sq mi)

Population (2011)
  - Total: 14,619
  - Density: 683/km^{2} (1,770/sq mi)

Racial makeup (2011)
  - Black African: 92.4%
  - Coloured: 2.1%
  - Indian/Asian: 0.3%
  - White African: 5.0%
  - Other: 0.3%

First languages (2011)
  - Sotho: 68.9%
  - Xhosa: 15.7%
  - Afrikaans: 7.7%
  - Zulu: 1.6%
  - Other: 6.0%
- Time zone: UTC+2 (SAST)
- Postal code (street): 9595
- PO box: 9595
- Area code: 056

Vredefort (locally /ˈfrɪərdəfɔːrt/, Afrikaans: [ˈfriədəfɔrt]) is a small farming town in the Free State province of South Africa with cattle, peanuts, sorghum, sunflowers and maize being farmed. It is home to 3,000 residents.

The town was established in 1876 on a farm called Visgat, on the Vredefort impact structure, the largest and oldest visible bolide impact crater in the world (with a diameter of 300 kilometres (190 mi)). It was this approximately 10-kilometre (6.2 mi) wide bolide that led to the preservation of the gold-bearing reefs of the Free State some 2.02 billion years ago. The town's name, which translates to "peace fort" in Afrikaans and Dutch, was derived from the peaceful conclusion to a threatened war between the Transvaal and the Orange Free State. The British built a concentration camp here during the Second Boer War to house Boer women and children.

The Vredefort Dome is currently the largest and one of the oldest known asteroid impact sites in the world. It is South Africa's seventh World Heritage Site and its status is largely due to the efforts of research scientists from Wits University.

== Notable residents ==
- Alba Bouwer
- T.T. Cloete
- Hendrik van den Bergh

== See also ==
- Vredefort impact structure
