= Cornelia, South Africa =

Cornelia
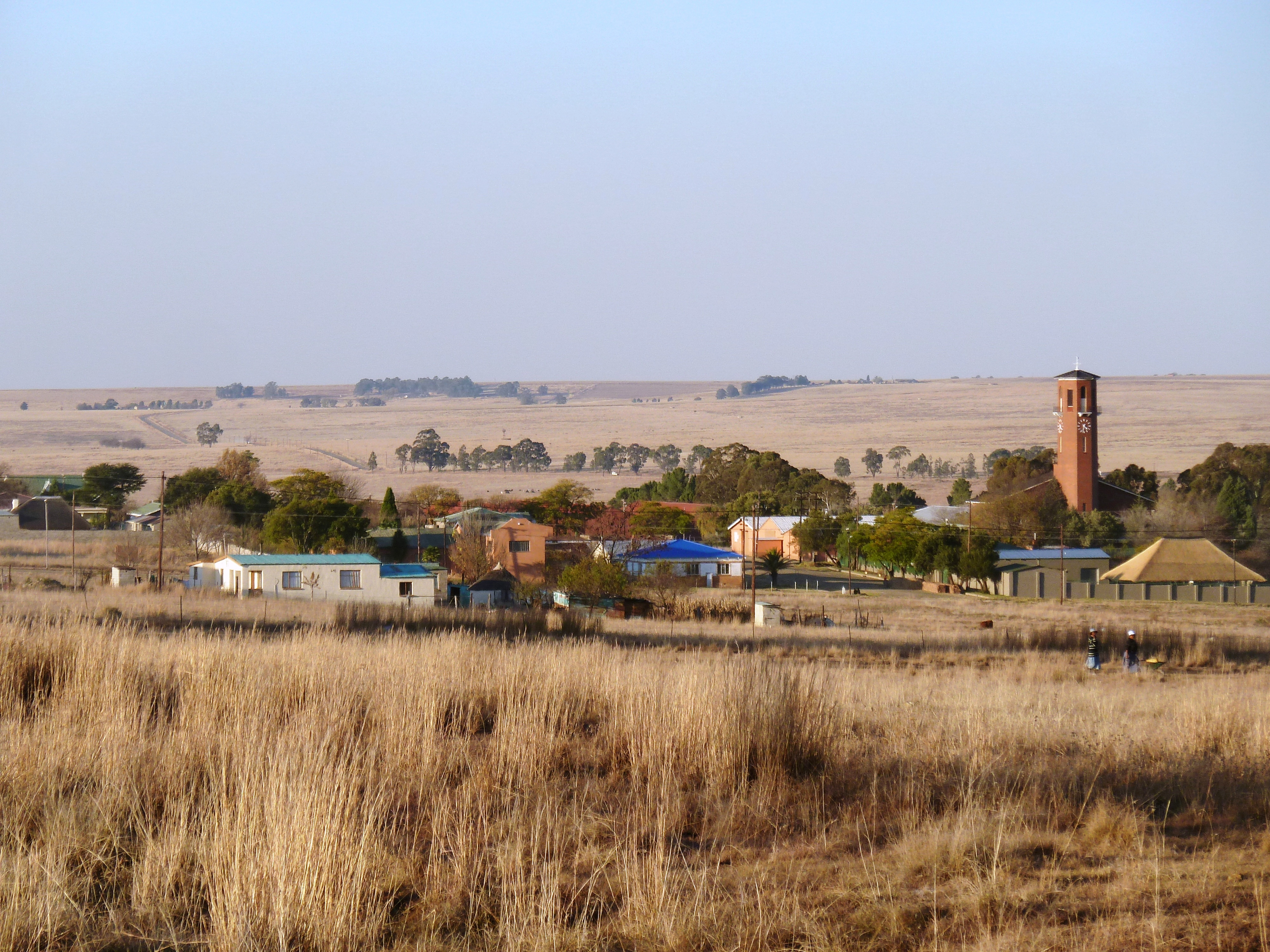
- Cornelia

- Location within Free State (South African province) Location within South Africa
- Coordinates: 27°14′03″S 28°51′03″E
- Country: South Africa
- Province: Free State
- District: Fezile Dabi
- Municipality: Mafube

Area
  - Total: 8.0 km^{2} (3.1 sq mi)

Population (2011)
  - Total: 2,964
  - Density: 370/km^{2} (960/sq mi)

Racial makeup (2011)
  - Black African: 97.3%
  - Coloured: 0.0%
  - Indian/Asian: 0.7%
  - White: 1.9%
  - Other: 0.1%

First languages (2011)
  - Sotho: 57.8%
  - Zulu: 33.7%
  - Afrikaans: 2.7%
  - English: 1.6%
  - Other: 4.2%
- Time zone: UTC+2 (SAST)
- Postal code (street): 9850
- PO box: 9850
- Area code: 058

Cornelia is a town on the R103 road in the Free State province of South Africa. J.D. Odendaal bought the farm "Sugarloaf" (known as Tafelkop) for a sum of R2,000. They settled there in 1876. At that time it was in the Harrismith district. There were no boundary fences and wild dogs, warthogs and wildebeest were plentiful in the open grassveld.

In 1886 the two farmers and other people formed the Afrikaans Baptist Church and J.D. Odendaal was the first preacher. The Odendaal family made an important contribution to the church.

DJ Steyn donated a piece of land to the church to erect a church building. There was a need for an educational institution and the church founded the school of Cornelia in 1889.

In 1894 it was named after the wife of former Free State President Francis William Reitz. One of the previous pastors of the Afrikaans Baptist Church of Cornelia (1959 or 1960) was Jurgens Lambrechts, later well known for appearing in numerous quiz programmes on radio and television from the 1970s to the 1990s.

The town is now part of Mafube Local Municipality that includes Tweeling, Villiers and Frankfort being the municipality head office.

The town is near the Skoonriver (Clean River).

== Fossil discoveries ==
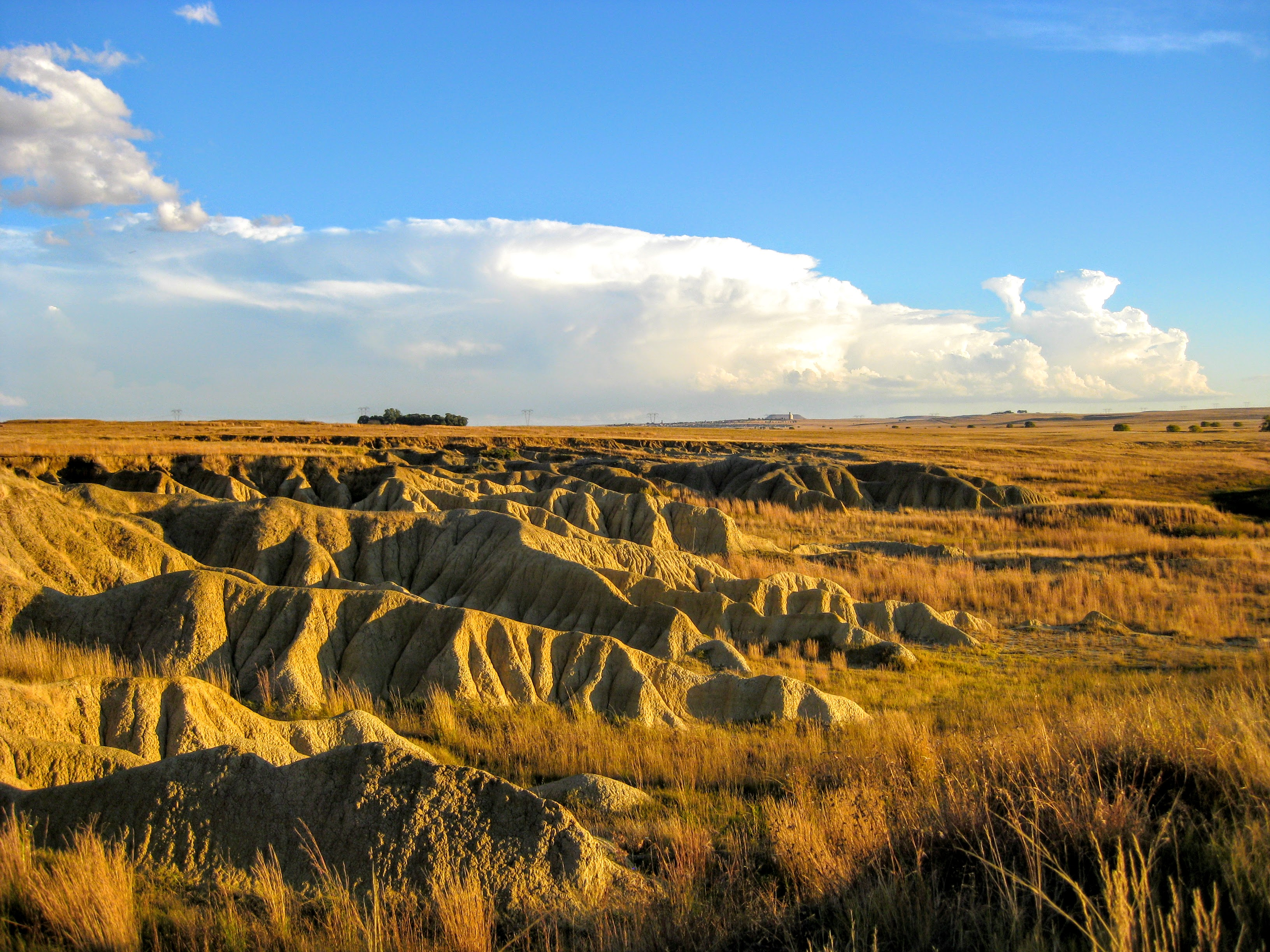
The Cornelia-Uitzoek Fossil & Archaeological site

On the Uitzoek farm, 10 km north of Cornelia, fossils were discovered in Pleistocene alluvial deposits by Van Hoepen in the 1920s and 1930s.

These fossils include extinct mammal forms such as a donkey-sized pig (Metridiochoerus modestus), the three-toed horse (Eurygnathohippus cornelianus) only previously found in Tanzania, the giant buffalo (Synerus antiquus), Bondi's springbok (Antidorcas bondi), and the giant wildebeest (Megolotragus eucornutus).

Acheulian Stone Age tools such as handaxes and cleavers have also been found here. Recent research document excavations of a fossil bone bed, possibly resulting from the accumulation by hyaenas and redeposition by dongas (i.e., gullies).

Associated with the fossil bone bed were a human (Homo sp.) tooth and Acheulian artifacts. These deposits are dated to the Jaramillo subchron (1.076 - 1.008 Ma) by paleomagnetism.

== Education ==
Ntswanatsatsi township west of the town is home to several Early Childhood Development Centres (ECD Centres) and a primary and secondary schools serving children from the town and neighbouring farms.

- Ntswanatsatsi Primary School
- Bongani-Lebohang Secondary School
