= Jimmy Kauleza =

South African soccer player

Personal information
- Full name: Jimmy Lefa Kauleza
- Date of birth: 16 September 1977 (age 49)
- Place of birth: Viljoenskroon, Free State, South Africa
- Height: 1.73 m (5 ft 8 in)
- Position: Striker

Team information
- Current team: Bay United
- Number: 20

Senior career*
Years	Team	Apps	(Gls)
2000–2002	Free State Stars	58	(17)
2002–2005	Orlando Pirates	55	(7)
2005	Jomo Cosmos	4	(0)
2005–2009	Free State Stars	42	(4)
2009–2010	Bay United		

International career
2002	South Africa	5	(1)
- * Club domestic league appearances and goals

Jimmy Lefa Kauleza (born 16 September 1977) is a South African former soccer player who played as a striker. He played at club level for Orlando Pirates, Jomo Cosmos, Free State Stars and Bay United, and earned five caps for the South African national team in 2002, scoring one goal. He was born in Viljoenskroon, Free State.
