= Edenville, South Africa =

Edenville
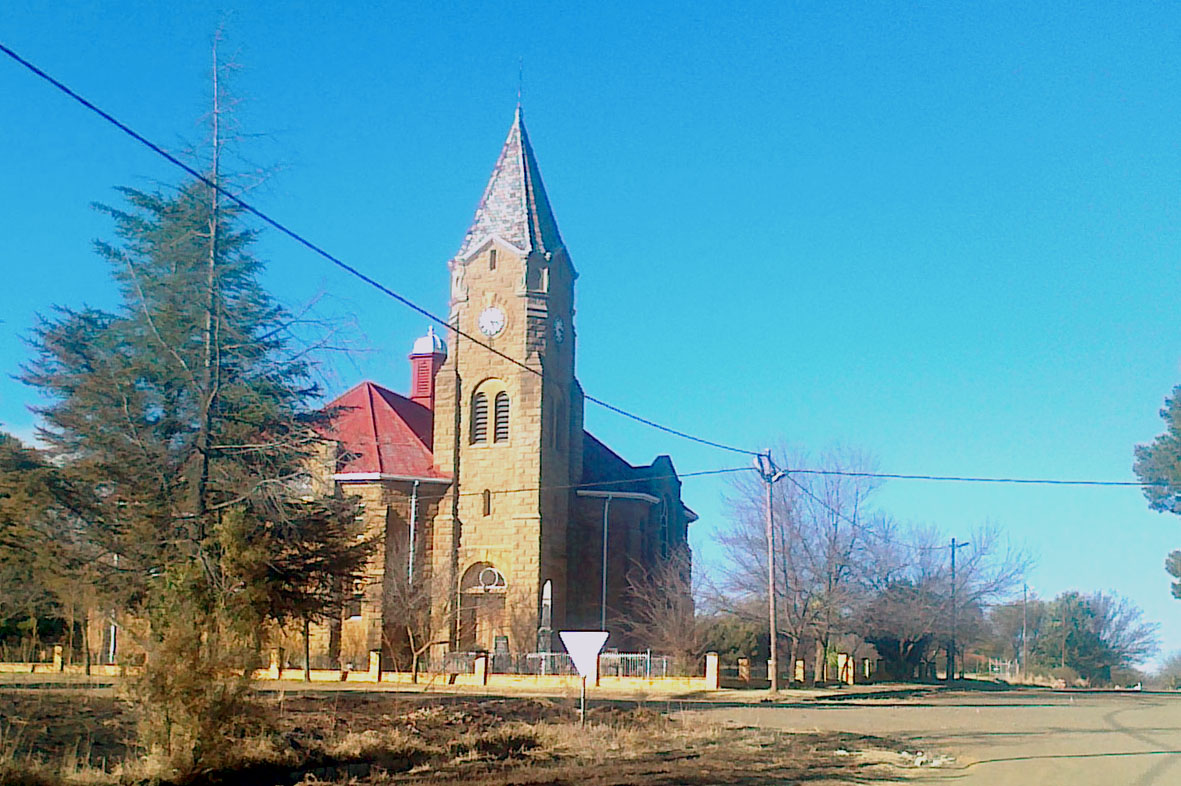
- Dutch Reformed Church in Edenville

- Location within Free State (South African province) Location within South Africa
- Coordinates: 27°33′S 27°40′E
- Country: South Africa
- Province: Free State
- District: Fezile Dabi
- Municipality: Ngwathe

Area
  - Total: 7.3 km^{2} (2.8 sq mi)

Population (2011)
  - Total: 6,294
  - Density: 860/km^{2} (2,200/sq mi)

Racial makeup (2011)
  - Black African: 94.7%
  - Coloured: 0.9%
  - Indian/Asian: 0.2%
  - White: 4.0%
  - Other: 0.2%

First languages (2011)
  - Sotho: 88.0%
  - Afrikaans: 4.7%
  - Zulu: 3.2%
  - Sign language: 1.0%
  - Other: 3.1%
- Time zone: UTC+2 (SAST)
- Postal code (street): 9535
- PO box: 9535

Edenville is a small farming town in the northern Free State province of South Africa.

The town is 48 km (30 mi) north-east of Kroonstad and 50 km (31 mi) south-west of Heilbron on the R34 road. It was established on the farms Erfdeel-Noord, Langland and Welgelegen in 1912, and attained municipal status in 1921. The name is assumed to refer to the biblical Garden of Eden, but this is uncertain.

== People from ==
Daniel Pule Kunene (1923–2016) - South African literary scholar, translator, and writer.
