= Viljoenskroon =

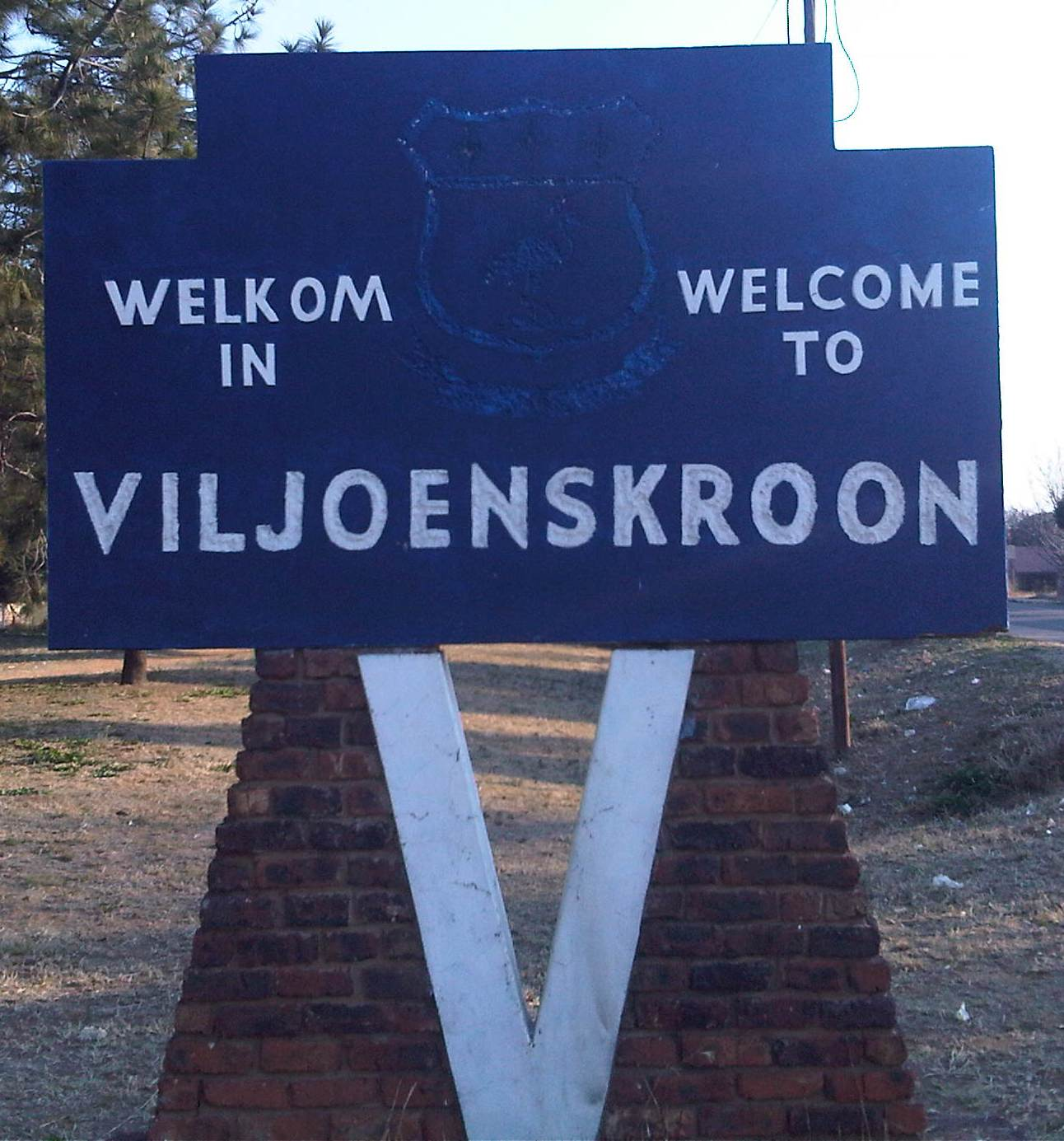
- The Viljoenskroon town entrance as seen on the side of the R76 in Engelbrecht street.

- Location within Free State (South African province) Location within South Africa
- Coordinates: 27°13′S 26°57′E
- Country: South Africa
- Province: Free State
- District: Fezile Dabi
- Municipality: Moqhaka

Area
  - Total: 12.7 km^{2} (4.9 sq mi)

Population (2011)
  - Total: 2,091
  - Density: 165/km^{2} (426/sq mi)

Racial makeup (2011)
  - Black African: 28.7%
  - Coloured: 0.8%
  - Indian/Asian: 0.7%
  - White: 67.9%
  - Other: 2.0%

First languages (2011)
  - Afrikaans: 66.7%
  - English: 6.1%
  - Sotho: 19.3%
  - Xhosa: 2.3%
  - Other: 5.6%
- Time zone: UTC+2 (SAST)
- Postal code (street): 9520
- PO box: 9520
- Area code: 05634
- Website: http://www.moqhaka.gov.za/

Viljoenskroon is a maize and cattle farming town located in the Free State province of South Africa. It was named after the original farm owner J. J. Viljoen and his horse Kroon (Crown). The town was laid out in 1921 on the farm "Mahemskuil" and became a municipality in 1925.

The Viljoenskroon municipality and neighboring township of Rammulotsi were incorporated into the greater Moqhaka Local Municipality in 1996 and forms part of the Fezile Dabi District municipality.

The Viljoenskroon/Rammulotsi urban unit has an estimated population of 59 202. Viljoenskroon historically played a part in providing residential opportunities to the adjacent mining communities at Lace Diamond Mine and the Orkney gold mines.

== Rammulotsi Tragedy ==
On 19 June 1990, five learners were shot dead by the armed police force during a massive protest against illiberals executed by the apartheid system. Their names were:

- Pitso Belo,
- Seunkie Ndzeku
- Jwale Moholo
- Moloeli Tsotsotso
- Ndoda Radebe

Meanwhile, two years later another war broke out when residents of Rammulotsi deposed the then mayor, Mr Nel for being stringent of awarding community stands for their housing

== Notable people ==
1. Olly Mlamleli (ANC Free State)
2. Jimmy Khauleza (Former Orlando Pirates and Bafana Bafana Star)
3. Thabo Meeko (Member of Free State Legislature)

== Schools ==
There are several schools in the Viljoenskroon area.Viljoenskroon's sporting grounds or park grounds' name is Rörich park, the grounds were named after Faan Rörich, who was the first lawyer in the town.

=== Viljoenskroon ===
- Salomon Senekal High school (Catering for learners from preschool to grade 12.)
- Windows of Hope Private Primary school
- Evergreen Independent Primary School (Catering for learners from preschool to grade 7.)

=== Rammulotsi ===
- Ntsoanatsatsi primary School (Doubling as a voting station during local and government elections.)
- Renyakalletse primary School
- Mphatlalatsane Combined School (school for learners with special needs)
- Kgolagano Secondary School
- Kgabareng Secondary School
- Thabang Secondary School
- Adeline Meje Primary School
- Rehauhetswe Secondary School
- Huntersflei Primary School ( DR Sello)
- Mahlabatheng Primary school

== Radio Station ==
The town is home to an Afrikaans language radio station called Overvaal Stereo 96.1FM.

== Rammulotsi open-toilet saga ==
During the May 2011 local government elections, the Rammulotsi open-toilet saga was central to political debate in the Republic of South Africa. The problems experienced with this specific government infrastructure project at Rammulotsi came to light a week before the local elections. It involved 1 831 toilets built by the construction company owned by the husband of then Viljoenskroon mayor, Mantebu Mokgosi. These toilets were not enclosed since construction started in 1995. Initially the ANC was unaware of the problems at Rammulotsi. According to Jackson Mthembu, the party had "evidence that Luthuli House didn't know there were open toilets in Moqhaka municipality. It wasn't brought to the attention of the ANC by anybody, not even Sicelo (Co-operative Governance minister),".

The matter was later referred to as the Free State open-toilet saga by the media after the discovery of a similar problem in Tshiame near Harrismith and national political figures such as Julius Malema, Helen Zille and Mangosuthu Buthelezi got involved in the debate. The issue was seen as of national importance by the ANC government which took the Democratic Alliance ruled City of Cape Town to court over the Cape Town open-toilet saga a few months before. In September 2011 Human Settlements Minister Tokyo Sexwale said that the open toilet saga had given politicians leeway to play "political football" when acknowledging that the ruling party was responsible for the open toilets in Rammulotsi and Tshiame. He later appointed ANC stalwart Winnie Madikizela-Mandela to head a national sanitation team consisting of 11 members, including a medical doctor, representatives of the SA Local Government Association, the water affairs department, the SA Municipal Workers' Union and people living in informal settlements to identify irregularities and malpractice, the scale of the problems, nature of sanitation problems and geographic extent...

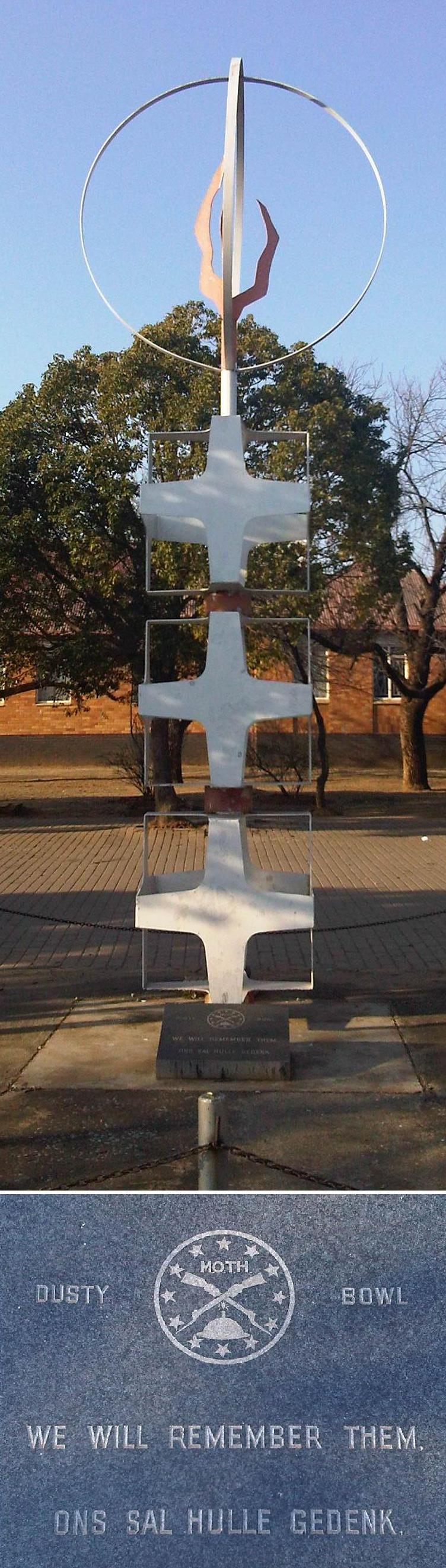
The Memorable Order of Tin Hats memorial next to the Viljoenskroon town hall.

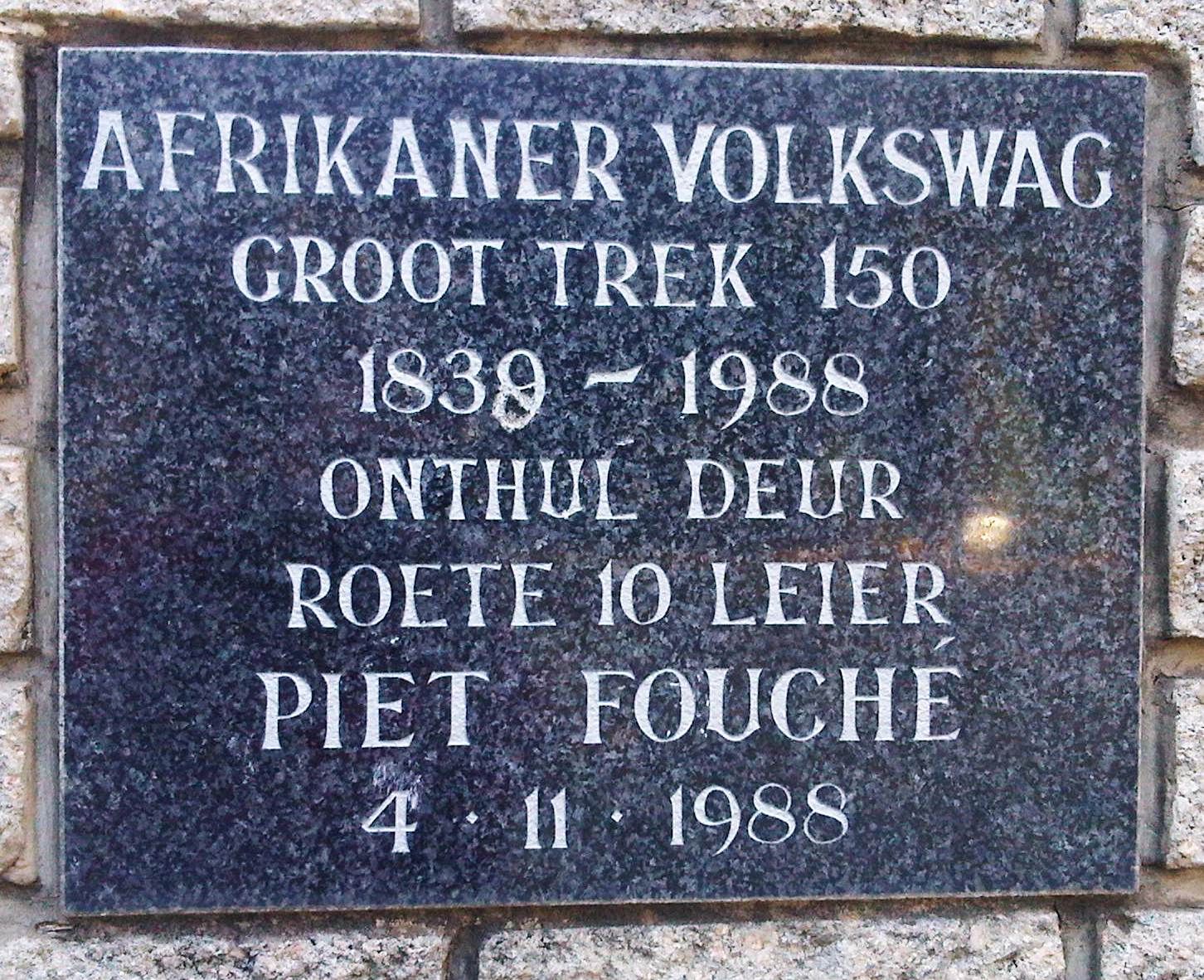
The commemorative plaque on the now demolished "Afrikaner Volkswag" monument commemorating the 150th anniversary of the Great Trek in Faan Röhrich Sports Park, Viljoenskroon.
