= Sasolburg =

- Location within Free State (South African province) Location within South Africa Location within Africa
- Coordinates: 26°48′51″S 27°49′43″E
- Country: South Africa
- Province: Free State
- District: Fezile Dabi
- Municipality: Metsimaholo

Area
  - Total: 58.6 km^{2} (22.6 sq mi)

Population (2023)
  - Total: 76,349
  - Density: 1,300/km^{2} (3,370/sq mi)

Racial makeup (2011)
  - Black African: 31%
  - Coloured: 1.6%
  - Indian/Asian: 1.0%
  - White: 66.1%
  - Other: 0.3%

First languages (2011)
  - Afrikaans: 64.0%
  - Sotho: 16.4%
  - English: 9.0%
  - Zulu: 2.8%
  - Other: 7.8%
- Time zone: UTC+2 (SAST)
- Postal code (street): 1947
- PO box: 1947
- Area code: 016
- Website: http://www.metsimahololoLocalMunicipality.gov.za

Sasolburg is a city in the Free State province of South Africa. The city is located in the northern part of the province and is the seat of the Metsimaholo Local Municipality.

The city lies 13 kilometres south of the Gauteng province and forms part of the Vaal Triangle (Vanderbijlpark, Vereeniging and Sasolburg) region. Most white residents of Sasolburg speak Afrikaans as a first language, while most black residents speak Sesotho as a first language.

== History ==
The town was established in 1954 to provide housing and other facilities for Sasol employees. The initial installation (Sasol 1) was a pilot plant to refine oil from coal, due to the lack of petroleum reserves. The coal reserves of the country were and still are extensive. The political developments of the late 1960s and early 1970s (specifically the trade embargoes against the apartheid government) made the operation of the pilot plant a priority to the government. Plans were made for a production plant to be built in the Eastern Transvaal to produce approximately 25% of the national fuel requirements. The new town of Secunda was built to house the construction and operations staff of what became known as SASOL 2 and SASOL 3 (Secunda CTL).

Sasol One was one of the first places to be designated as a National Key Point under the National Key Points Act, 1980, which legislation protected areas so designated from "loss, damage, disruption or immobilisation (that) may prejudice the Republic".

=== Radioactivity incident ===
January 8, 1977 – a 6.7 Ci (250 GBq) iridium-192 source fell out of its container at a construction site. The radiographer did not notice the loss of the source and left the site. A construction supervisor later picked up the source and placed it in his shirt pocket. He travelled home and placed the source in a cupboard. The source was recognized as lost two days later after workers were shown a replica and it was recovered the same day. The supervisor received a whole body dose of 116 rad (1.16 Gy) and required the amputation of two fingers. His wife and child received doses of 17 rad (0.17 Gy) and 10 rad (0.10 Gy) respectively.

=== Bombing ===
On 2 June 1980, Sasolburg was attacked by Umkhonto we Sizwe (MK), the African National Congress's (ANC) military wing. They bombed two strategically important SASOL (oil-from-coal) plants and an oil refinery. This event was depicted in the 2006 film Catch a Fire.

Kader Asmal, founder of the Irish Anti-Apartheid Movement, claimed in his memoirs, Politics in my Blood, that the ANC had recruited volunteers from the Provisional Irish Republican Army (IRA) to do reconnaissance on the refinery.

The attack proved to be largely ineffectual in terms of sabotaging the manufacturing processes of the Sasol plant. However the propaganda impact of the attack was significant: the South African government presented the event as the result of a foreign, communist onslaught against South Africa, and not a domestic reaction to the country's racial policies. Police Minister Louis le Grange claimed that the then-exiled Joe Slovo, of the banned South African Communist Party, was a key figure. Newspapers that supported the ruling National Party claimed that, in fact, Muammar Qaddafi had masterminded the sabotage, and that Russians had been training terrorists in Libya.

=== October 1987 strike ===
On 1 October 1987, Sasol 1's management called in police and vigilantes to break up a workers’ strike resulting from a wage dispute. Over the following weeks, 77 workers died, and the 2 400 jobs were retrenched without their due compensation. The ex-workers took SASOL to court as result and, in 1989, the Labour Court ruled in favour of the ex-workers; however, as of 2014, they have yet to receive compensation. SASOL still denies responsibility and, as a result of the refinery's designation as a National Key Point, the actions taken against workers remain secret until today.

=== Demarcation riots ===
In January 2013, residents of Sasolburg's Zamdela township rioted in response to a demarcation proposal to incorporate Sasolburg into the neighbouring Parys's Ngwathe municipality, believing that the merge would result in poorer service delivery and increased corruption. Police were unable to stop the violence, which involved assault, vandalism, and plundering, as they were outnumbered.

== Geography ==
Sasolburg is at a high altitude with a fairly dry climate and large seasonal temperature variation. It is situated on the banks of the Vaal River, which separates the Free State from the former Transvaal Province, and is not far from the Vaal Dam where excellent windsurfing spots can be found.

== Government ==
Sasolburg is the seat of both the Fezile Dabi District Municipality and the Metsimaholo Local Municipality of the northern Free State.

== People from Sasolburg ==
- Mia le Roux, Miss South Africa 2024.

== See also ==
- Petroleum industry in South Africa
