= Flavius Mareka FET College =

South African college

Coordinates: 26.81695°S 27.83974°E

Flavius Mareka FET College is situated in the Fezile Dabi District of the Free State Province, South Africa. The Flavius Mareka FET College includes the following former institutions: Kroonstad - Mphohadi - and Sasolburg Campus.
