= Mafube Local Municipality =

Coordinates: 27°17′S 28°31′E

Mafube
- Local municipality
- Seal

- Location in the Free State
- Country: South Africa
- Province: Free State
- District: Fezile Dabi
- Seat: Frankfort
- Wards: 9

Government
  - Type: Municipal council

Area
  - Total: 3,971 km^{2} (1,533 sq mi)

Population (2022)
  - Total: 61,150
  - Density: 15.40/km^{2} (39.88/sq mi)

Racial makeup (2022)
  - Black African: 92.3%
  - Coloured: 0.5%
  - White: 7.0%

First languages (2011)
  - Sotho: 64.4%
  - Zulu: 20.9%
  - Afrikaans: 8.3%
  - Xhosa: 1.7%
  - Other: 4.7%
- Time zone: UTC+2 (SAST)
- Municipal code: FS205

Mafube Municipality (Sotho: Masepala wa Mafube; Zulu: UMasipala wase Mafube) is a local municipality within the Fezile Dabi District Municipality, in the Free State province of South Africa.

Mafube is a Sesotho word meaning "dawning of the new day".

== Main places ==
The 2001 census divided the municipality into the following main places:

Place	Code	Area (km^{2})	Population	Most spoken language
Cornelia	42001	1.95	1,502	Sotho
Frankfort	42002	32.64	1,900	Zulu
Mafahlaneng	42003	145.68	5,367	Sotho
Namahadi	42005	4.28	19,413	Sotho
Ntshwanatsatsi	42006	0.36	1,867	Sotho
Qalabotjha	42007	1.95	17,244	Sotho
Villiers	42008	24.27	984	Zulu
Remainder of the municipality	42004	4,371.52	9,363	Sotho

== Politics ==
The municipal council consists of seventeen members elected by mixed-member proportional representation. Nine councillors are elected by first-past-the-post voting in nine wards, while the remaining eight are chosen from party lists so that the total number of party representatives is proportional to the number of votes received.

In the election of 4 November 2026, the African National Congress (ANC) lost its majority, but remains the largest party, with seven seats on the council.

The following table shows the results of the election.

Party	Ward			List			Total seats
Party	Votes	%	Seats	Votes	%	Seats	Total seats
African National Congress	6,361	39.37	7	6,368	39.71	0	7
Democratic Alliance	2,987	18.49	0	2,953	18.41	3	3
Freedom Front Plus	2,241	13.87	2	2,168	13.52	0	2
Mafube First	1,299	8.04	0	1,436	8.95	2	2
Economic Freedom Fighters	1,102	6.82	0	1,103	6.88	1	1
Pan Africanist Congress of Azania	589	3.65	0	584	3.64	1	1
South African Communist Party	455	2.82	0	426	2.66	1	1
Independent candidates	1	0.01	0				0
8 other parties	1,123	6.95	0	1,000	6.24	0	0
Total	16,158	100.00	9	16,038	100.00	8	17
Valid votes	16,158	97.37		16,038	97.22		
Invalid/blank votes	437	2.63		458	2.78		
Total votes	16,595	100.00		16,496	100.00		
Registered voters/turnout	32,190	51.55		32,190	51.25		

== Mismanagement ==
In 2015 the municipal manager, Nkabi Hlubi, allegedly awarded tenders to the value of R21 million to Pit Dog Trading. The latter company allegedly manipulated its tender grading and provided Hlubi with kickbacks of R1 million each time a municipal payment was made. Hlubi appeared in the Bloemfontein magistrate's court in 2021 on charges of fraud and corruption.

As of January 2024, the municipality is under administration, one of 32 in the country, and three in the Free State where the provincial executive has intervened due to maladministration.

In September 2024, the Municipal Workers Retirement Fund took the municipality to court after the municipality had deducted close to R38 million from workers for pension fund contributions, but never paid this over to the pension fund. The court ordered the municipality to pay the outstanding pension fund money. In January 2025 the Bloemfontein High Court found Mafube mayor Tlhoare Motsoeneng and the CFO personally responsible for the pension fund money that has been missing from the municipal workers. They were both ordered to pay more than R14.6 million within 60 days.

In January 2025, the municipality was listed as one of the top ten municipalities in arrears on their pension contributions.

In March 2025, the court has ruled against the Free State municipalities including Mafube local government, to end the sewage crisis within its borders. In August 2025, The ANC Provincial Executive Committee resolved to fire leaders in the underperforming local governments to address governance failures, corruption, and service delivery challenges ahead of the 2026 local elections.Mafube is one of those municipalities affected.
