= Tweeling =

Tweeling Mafahlaneng
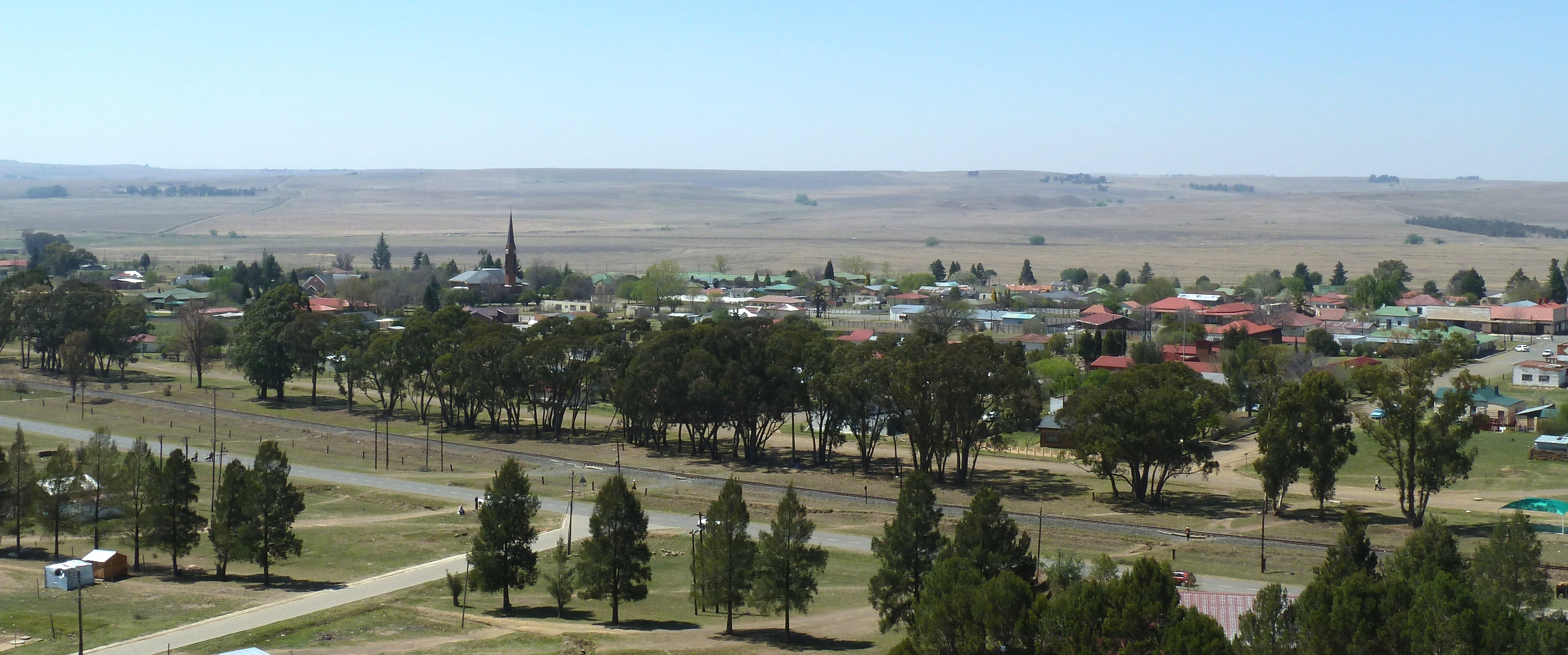
- View of Tweeling

- Location within Free State (South African province) Location within South Africa
- Coordinates: 27°33′S 28°31′E
- Country: South Africa
- Province: Free State
- District: Fezile Dabi
- Municipality: Mafube

Area
  - Total: 4.6 km^{2} (1.8 sq mi)
- Elevation: 1,600 m (5,200 ft)

Population (2011)
  - Total: 6,465
  - Density: 1,400/km^{2} (3,600/sq mi)

Racial makeup (2011)
  - Black African: 93.9%
  - Coloured: 1.7%
  - Indian/Asian: 0.4%
  - White: 3.8%
  - Other: 0.1%

First languages (2011)
  - Sotho: 76.1%
  - Zulu: 13.8%
  - Afrikaans: 6.1%
  - Sign language: 1.5%
  - Other: 2.6%
- Time zone: UTC+2 (SAST)
- Postal code (street): 9820
- PO box: 9820
- Area code: 058

Tweeling (meaning twin in Dutch and Afrikaans) is a small town situated 22 km from Frankfort in the Free State province of South Africa. The adjacent township is named Mafahlaneng, or "place of twins". This region of the highveld is colloquially known as the Riemland, recalling a time when it was a favoured hunting ground of the early pioneers.

== Early inhabitants ==
The very first people or inhabitants of this place were the San, this is evident from the rock art and paintings left on the rocks. Students from the University of Witwatersrand Rock Art Research Institute are currently busy researching the site. National Museum from Bloemfontein visited the site for the first time this year 2026 to explore the rock art and compile a full report.

== Establishment of the town ==
The town was established in 1920 on the two farms Tweelingspruit and Tweelingkop, their names derived from two similar looking hills just outside the town. It is situated just east of the Liebenbergsvlei River which is a conduit for water from the Lesotho Highlands Water Project.

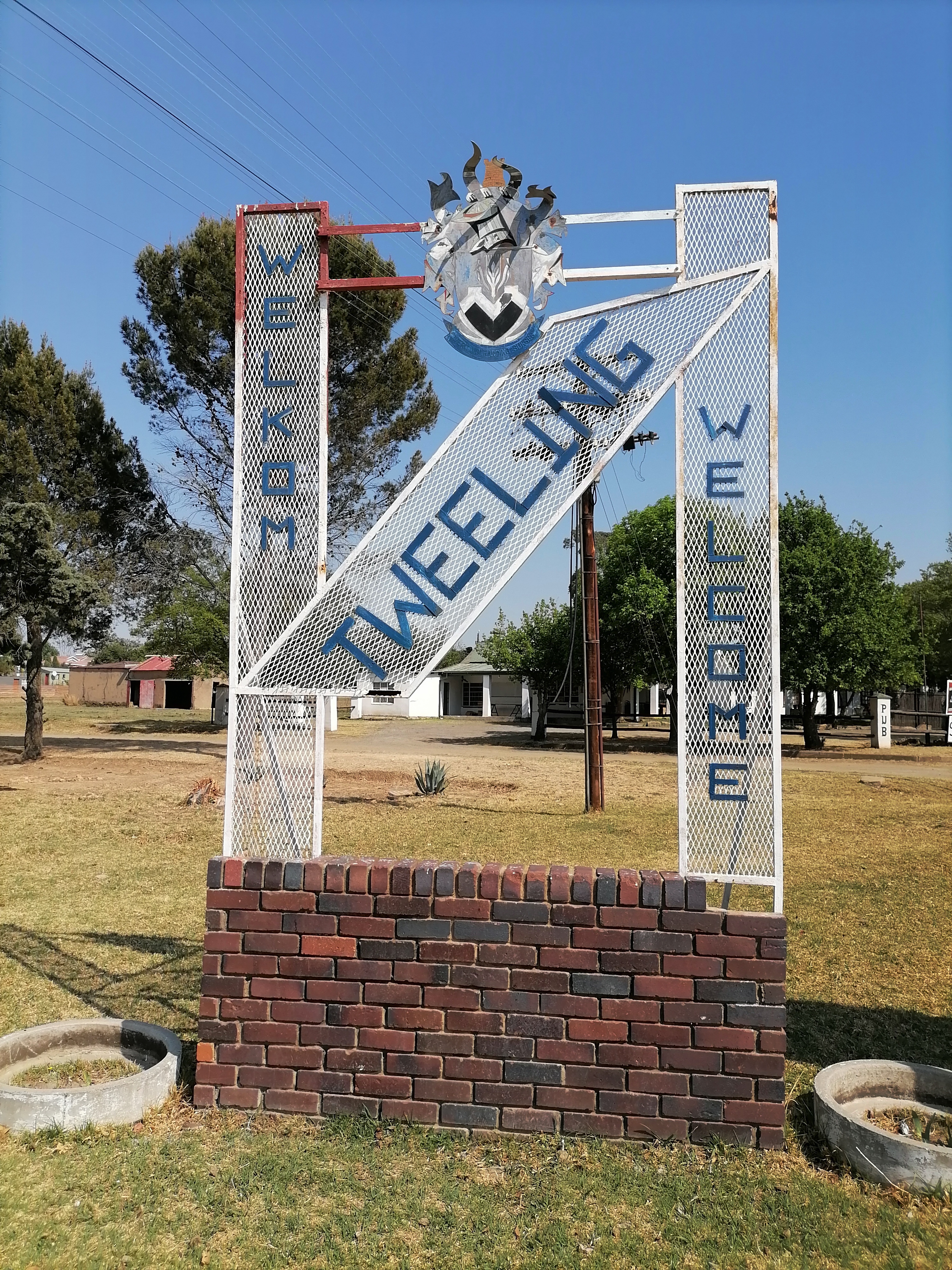
Tweeling, Free State

Tweeling is the halfway mark of the annual Liebensbergvlei Canoe Marathon. The two day race starts near Reitz and halts 33 km downstream at Zorgvliet farm, near Tweeling. The second stage starts from Bruinswick farm north of town and ends at Frankfort.Tweeling Mafahlaneng is part of Mafube Local Municipality

== Attractions ==
- Mafahlaneng Shelter Caves

https://rari.wits.ac.za/index.php/rari-rari-twg1-46d

== People from Tweeling ==
- Johan Heyns, theologian
- Sisi Ntombela, politician and sixth premier of the Free State
- Pakiso Mthembu, athlete, University of the Free State Sportsman of The Year 2019
- Portchie, artist

== Gallery ==
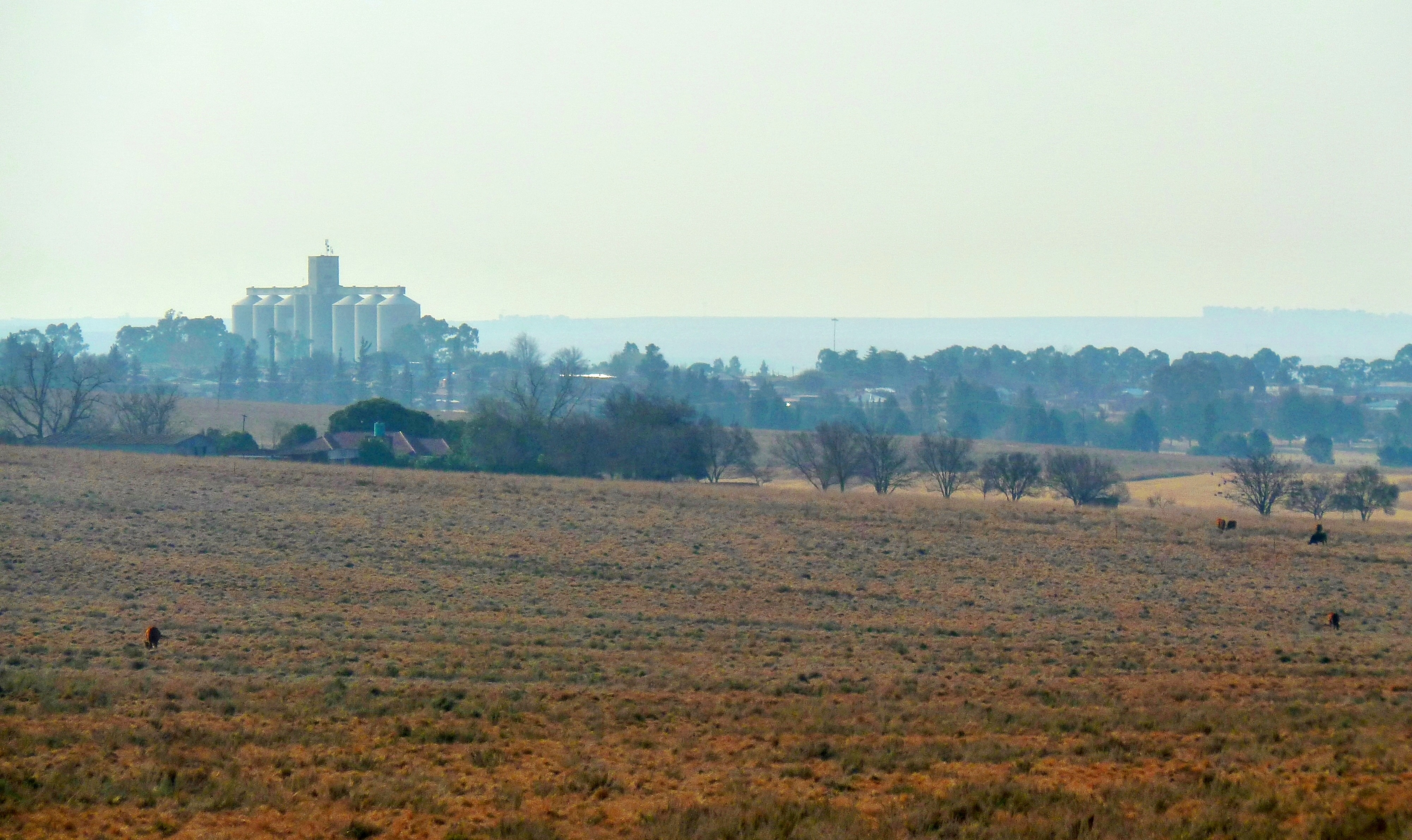
Winter landscape around Tweeling

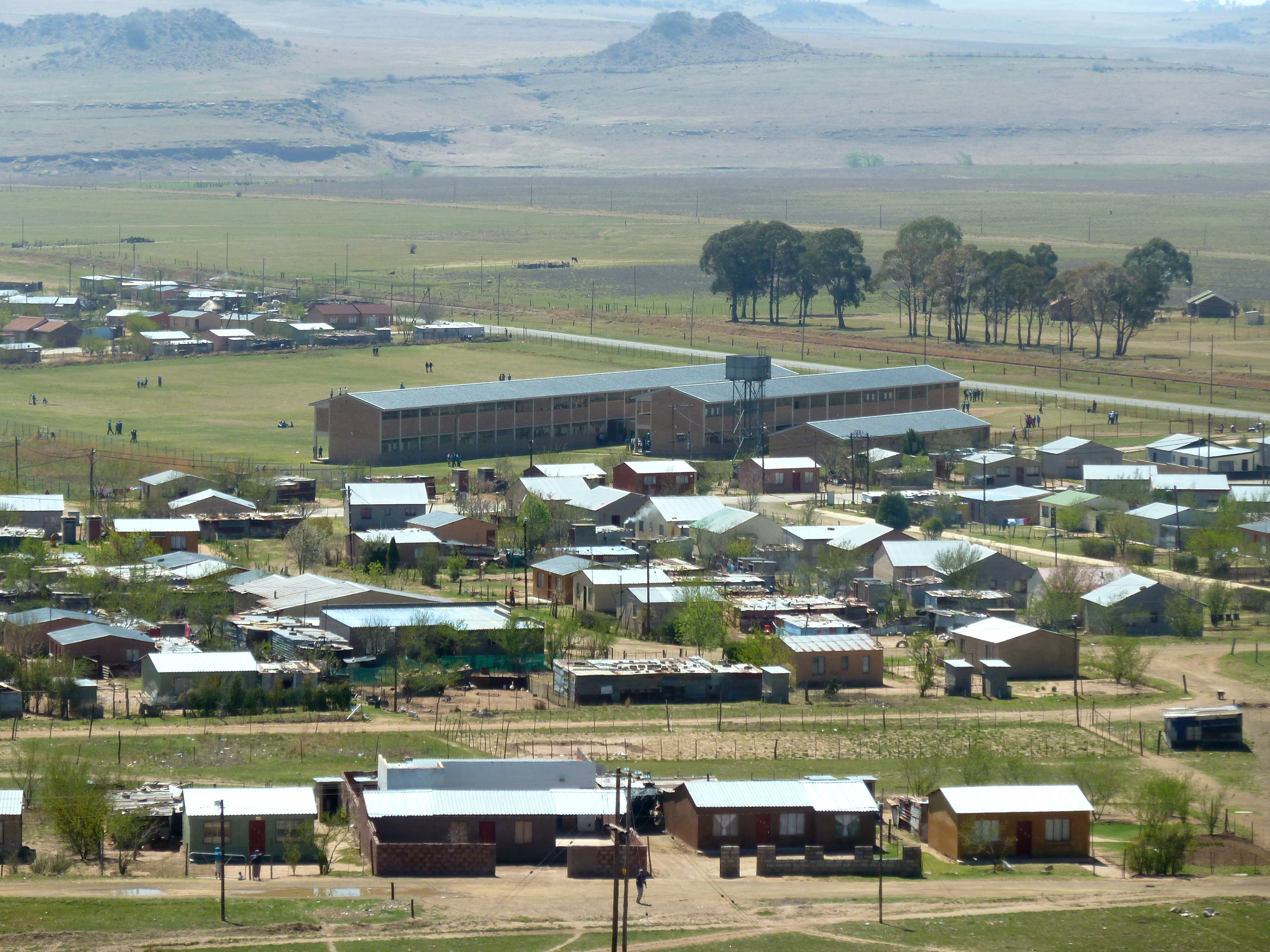
Refeng Thabo High School in Mafahlaneng township

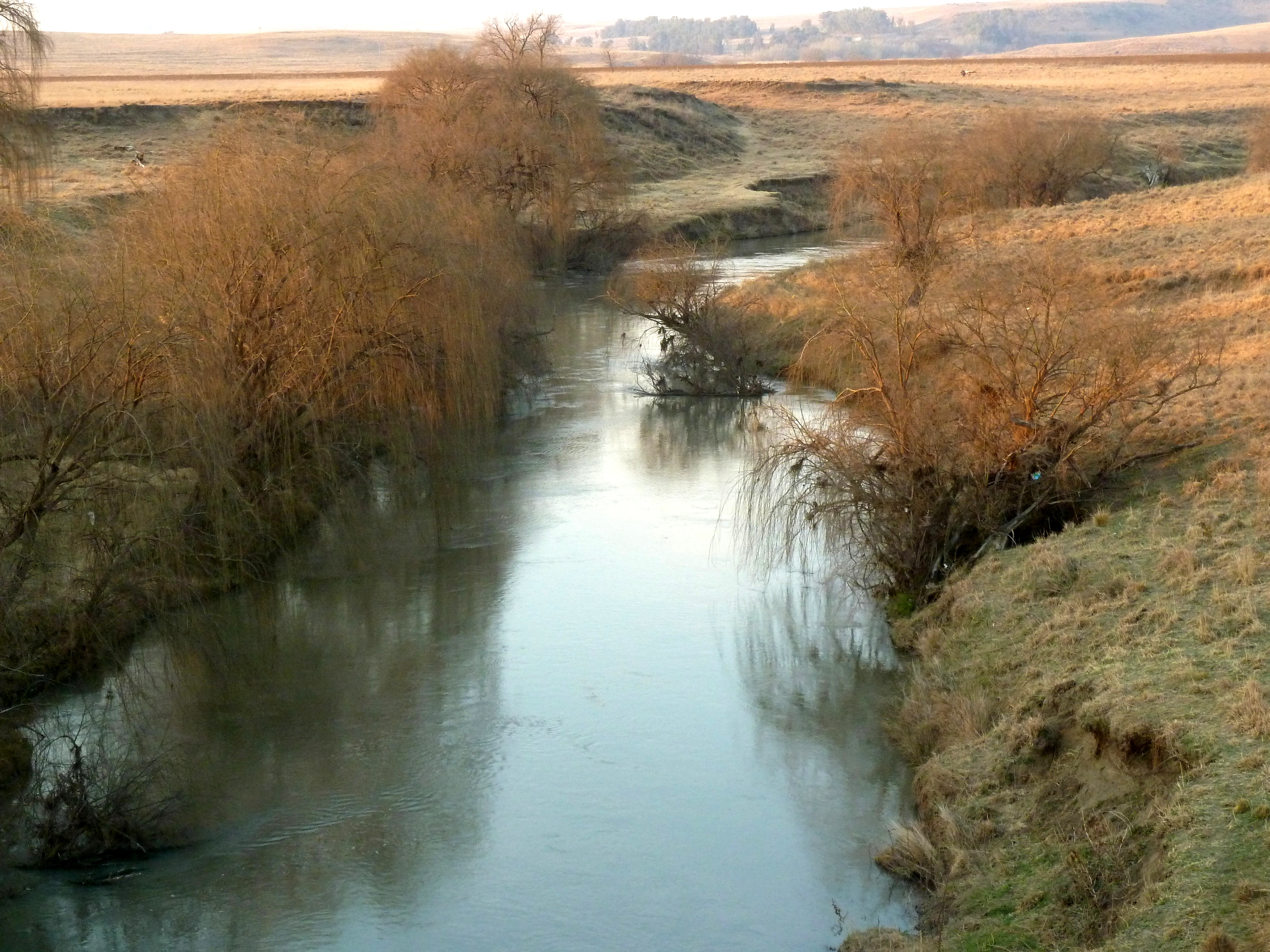
Liebenbergsvlei River north of town
