= Moqhaka Local Municipality =

Coordinates: 27°39′S 27°14′E

Moqhaka
- Local municipality
- Seal

- Location in the Free State
- Country: South Africa
- Province: Free State
- District: Fezile Dabi
- Seat: Kroonstad
- Wards: 25

Government
  - Type: Municipal council
  - Mayor: Cllr. M. Mokatsane
  - Municipal Manager: Mr. S.M Mqwathi

Area
  - Total: 7,925 km^{2} (3,060 sq mi)

Population (2022)
  - Total: 155,410
  - Density: 19.61/km^{2} (50.79/sq mi)

Racial makeup (2022)
  - Black African: 85.8%
  - Coloured: 2.9%
  - Indian/Asian: 0.3%
  - White: 10.9%

First languages (2011)
  - Sotho: 74.6%
  - Afrikaans: 13.6%
  - Xhosa: 3.9%
  - English: 2.5%
  - Other: 5.4%
- Time zone: UTC+2 (SAST)
- Municipal code: FS201

Moqhaka Municipality (Sotho: Masepala wa Moqhaka; Afrikaans: Moqhaka Munisipaliteit) is a local municipality within the Fezile Dabi District Municipality, in the Free State province of South Africa. In 2022, the population was 155,410 with a total area of 7925 km^{2}. The seat is Kroonstad. Moqhaka is the Sesotho word for "crown".

== Main places ==
The 2001 census divided the municipality into the following main places:

Place	Code	Area (km^{2})	Population	Most spoken language
Kroonstad	41701	232.04	23,992	Afrikaans
Maokeng	41702	12.62	67,929	Sotho
Matlwangtlwang	41703	1.59	6,441	Sotho
Rammulutsi	41705	4.03	24,578	Sotho
Steynsrus	41706	1.66	1,192	Afrikaans
Vaal Reefs Mine	41707	12.04	5,050	Sotho
Vierfontein	41708	2.84	832	Afrikaans
Viljoenskroon	41709	13.73	2,514	Afrikaans
Remainder of the municipality	41704	7,619.38	35,362	Sotho

== Politics ==
The municipal council consists of forty members elected by mixed-member proportional representation. Twenty councillors are elected by first-past-the-post voting in twenty wards, while the remaining twenty are chosen from party lists so that the total number of party representatives is proportional to the number of votes received.

In the 2026 South African municipal elections, no party won a majority. The African National Congress (ANC) won the largest number of seats on the council, with fifteen.

The following table shows the results of the 2026 election.

Party	Ward			List			Total seats
Party	Votes	%	Seats	Votes	%	Seats	Total seats
African National Congress	13,200	35.39	15	13,306	35.84	0	15
Democratic Alliance	12,188	32.67	5	12,176	32.79	8	13
Economic Freedom Fighters	3,289	8.82	0	3,365	9.06	4	4
Freedom Front Plus	2,655	7.12	0	2,721	7.33	3	3
United Development Forum	1,228	3.29	0	1,207	3.25	1	1
Moqhaka Community Forum	614	1.65	0	893	2.41	1	1
African Congress for Transformation	700	1.88	0	692	1.86	1	1
ActionSA	639	1.71	0	708	1.91	1	1
South African Communist Party	311	0.83	0	415	1.12	1	1
Independent candidates	293	0.79	0				0
12 other parties	2,184	5.86	0	1,645	4.43	0	0
Total	37,301	100.00	20	37,128	100.00	20	40
Valid votes	37,301	97.47		37,128	97.41		
Invalid/blank votes	969	2.53		987	2.59		
Total votes	38,270	100.00		38,115	100.00		
Registered voters/turnout	81,781	46.80		81,781	46.61		

== Curruption ==
In August 2025, the ANC Provincial Executive Committee resolved to fire its leaders in all underperforming local governments to address governance failures, corruption, and service delivery challenges ahead of the 2026 local elections. Moqhaka Local Municipality was among those municipalities affected after years of corruption and maladministration.
