= Villiers, South Africa =

Villiers
- Location within Free State (South African province) Location within South Africa
- Coordinates: 27°02′S 28°36′E
- Country: South Africa
- Province: Free State
- District: Fezile Dabi
- Municipality: Mafube
- Established: 1891

Area
  - Total: 9.3 km^{2} (3.6 sq mi)

Population (2011)
  - Total: 17,315
  - Density: 1,900/km^{2} (4,800/sq mi)

Racial makeup (2011)
  - Black African: 94.0%
  - Coloured: 0.3%
  - Indian/Asian: 0.3%
  - White: 5.1%
  - Other: 0.2%

First languages (2011)
  - Sotho: 66.7%
  - Zulu: 19.6%
  - Afrikaans: 6.2%
  - Xhosa: 2.2%
  - Other: 5.4%
- Time zone: UTC+2 (SAST)
- Postal code (street): 9840
- PO box: 9840
- Area code: 058

Villiers is a small town situated on the banks of the Vaal River next to the N3 highway in the Free State province of South Africa, on the border with Mpumalanga province. It is part of the Mafube Local Municipality. It was founded in 1882 on the two farms Pearson Valley and Grootdraai owned by Lourens de Villiers.

== History ==
The town of Villiers is named after Lourens de Villiers on whose farms Pearsons Valley and Grootdraai the town was first built. The town was established at the Vaal River crossing on the route between Durban and Johannesburg. The town was proclaimed by State President F.W. Reitz on 29 May 1891.

== Notable people ==
- Theuns Stofberg
