= Ngwathe Local Municipality =

Coordinates: 26°53′43″S 27°27′32″E

Ngwathe
- Local municipality
- Seal

- Location in the Free State
- Country: South Africa
- Province: Free State
- District: Fezile Dabi
- Seat: Parys
- Wards: 20

Government
  - Type: Municipal council
  - Mayor: Victoria de Beer

Area
  - Total: 7,055 km^{2} (2,724 sq mi)

Population (2022)
  - Total: 134,962
  - Density: 19.13/km^{2} (49.55/sq mi)

Racial makeup (2022)
  - Black African: 83.4%
  - Coloured: 2.5%
  - Indian/Asian: 0.3%
  - White: 13.6%

First languages (2011)
  - Sotho: 68.6%
  - Afrikaans: 13.4%
  - Xhosa: 8.5%
  - Zulu: 3.4%
  - Other: 6.1%
- Time zone: UTC+2 (SAST)
- Municipal code: FS203

Ngwathe Municipality (Sotho: Masepala wa Ngwathe; Afrikaans: Ngwathe Munisipaliteit) is a local municipality within the Fezile Dabi District Municipality, in the Free State province of South Africa. Ngwathe is the Sesotho name for the Renoster River.

== Main places ==
The 2001 census divided the municipality into the following main places:

Place	Code	Area (km^{2})	Population	Most spoken language
Edenville	41801	9.25	896	Sotho
Heilbron	41802	26.47	9,652	Sotho
Koppies	41803	114.90	967	Afrikaans
Kwakwatsi	41804	1.81	7,830	Sotho
Mokwallo	41805	1.87	8,637	Sotho
Ngwathe	41811	0.88	5,294	Sotho
Parys	41807	17.28	10,716	Afrikaans
Phiritona	41808	3.10	15,874	Sotho
Tumahole	41809	23.21	33,084	Sotho
Vredefort	41810	19.77	3,053	Sotho
Remainder of the municipality	41806	6,860.55	22,811	Sotho

== Politics ==
The municipal council consists of thirty-six members elected by mixed-member proportional representation. Eighteen councillors are elected by first-past-the-post voting in eighteen wards, while the remaining eighteen are chosen from party lists so that the total number of party representatives is proportional to the number of votes received.

In the election of 4 November 2026 the African National Congress (ANC) lost its majority, but remained the largest party, with ten seats on the council.

The following table shows the results of the 2026 election.

Party	Ward			List			Total seats
Party	Votes	%	Seats	Votes	%	Seats	Total seats
African National Congress	10,046	36.30	10	9,897	35.72	0	10
Democratic Alliance	7,777	28.10	3	7,877	28.43	5	8
African Congress for Transformation	4,150	14.99	1	4,275	15.43	3	4
Freedom Front Plus	2,188	7.91	0	2,198	7.93	2	2
Economic Freedom Fighters	1,739	6.28	0	1,752	6.32	2	2
South African Communist Party	872	3.15	0	896	3.23	1	1
11 other parties	906	3.27	0	814	2.94	0	0
Total	27,678	100.00	14	27,709	100.00	13	27
Valid votes	27,678	98.12		27,709	97.96		
Invalid/blank votes	530	1.88		578	2.04		
Total votes	28,208	100.00		28,287	100.00		
Registered voters/turnout	52,187	54.05		52,187	54.20		

== Fraud and mismanagement ==
In October 2024, Abram Maheso was arrested after attempting to defraud the municipality of R800 000 by claiming the account as his own when setting up an investment account.

Afriforum and the Save Ngwathe community group brought forward a case to dissolve the municipality, due to longstanding failures to fulfil its duties to residents, and compel the Free State provincial government to step in. In June 2025, the Free State High Court ordered the dissolution of the municipality.
