= Free State (province) =

Free State: Vrystaat (Afrikaans); Freistata (Sotho)
- Province
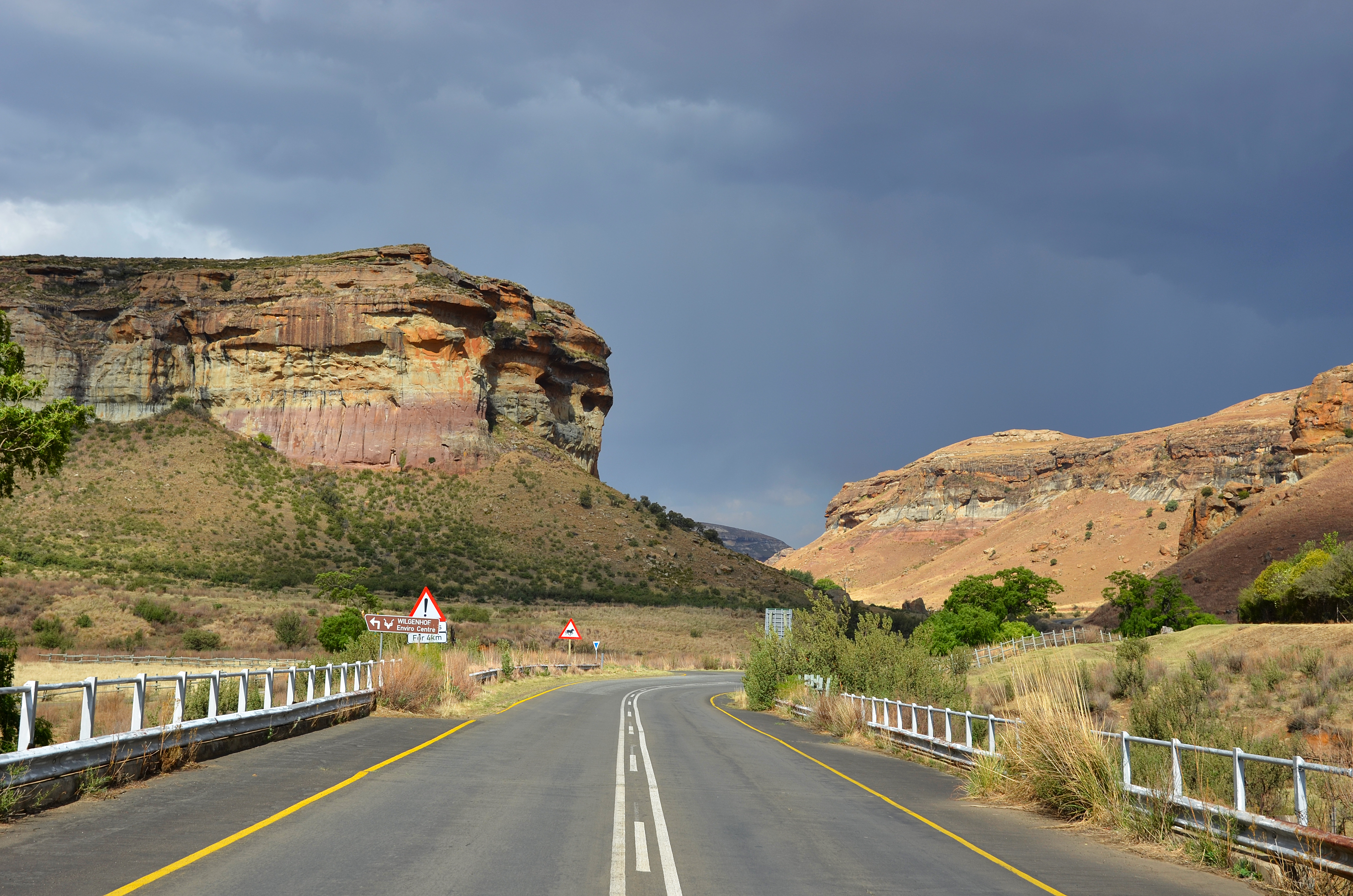
- Golden Gate Highlands National Park

- Coat of arms
- Motto: Katleho ka kopano (Success through unity)
- Location of the Free State in South Africa
- Coordinates: 28°S 27°E
- Country: South Africa
- Orange Free State: 17 February 1854
- OFS Province: 31 May 1910
- Free State: 27 April 1994
- Capital: Bloemfontein
- Districts: List: Xhariep; Mangaung; Lejweleputswa; Thabo Mofutsanyana; Fezile Dabi

Government
  - Type: Parliamentary system
  - Premier: Maqueen Letsoha-Mathae (ANC)
  - Legislature: Free State Provincial Legislature

Area
  - Total: 129,825 km^{2} (50,126 sq mi)
  - Rank: 3rd in South Africa
- Highest elevation: 3,291 m (10,797 ft)

Population (2022)
  - Total: 2,961,864
  - Rank: 8th in South Africa
  - Density: 22.8143/km^{2} (59.0887/sq mi)
  - Rank: 8th in South Africa

Population groups (2022)
  - Black: 88.9%
  - White: 8.0%
  - Coloured: 2.6%
  - Indian or Asian: 0.4%
  - Other: 0.1%

Languages (2022)
  - Sotho: 72.3%
  - Afrikaans: 10.3%
  - Xhosa: 5.5%
  - Tswana: 5.3%
  - English: 1.5%
- Time zone: UTC+2 (SAST)
- ISO 3166 code: ZA-FS
- GDP: US$20.0 billion
- HDI (2019): 0.708 high · 4th of 9
- Website: www.freestateonline.fs.gov.za

Free State
- Zulu: iFuleyisitata
- Xhosa: eFleyistata
- Afrikaans: Vrystaat
- Sepedi: Freistata
- Swazi: eFleyistata
- Sesotho: Freistata
- Setswana: Foreistata
- Xitsonga: Fiyeyisitata
- Venda: Fureisitata
- Southern Ndebele: iFrheyistata
- Khoekhoe: ǀkx’aba!hub

The Free State (Note: Afrikaans: Vrystaat [ˈfrəistɑːt]; Sotho: Freistata; Xhosa: eFreyistata; Tswana: Foreistata; Zulu: iFuleyisitata) is a province of South Africa. Its capital is Bloemfontein, which is also South Africa's judicial capital. Its historical origins lie in the Boer republic called the Orange Free State and later the Orange Free State Province.

== History ==
The current borders of the province date from 1994 when the Bantustans were abolished and reincorporated into South Africa. It is also the only one of the four original provinces of South Africa not to undergo border changes, apart from the reincorporation of Bantustans, and its borders date from before the outbreak of the Boer War.

== Geography ==
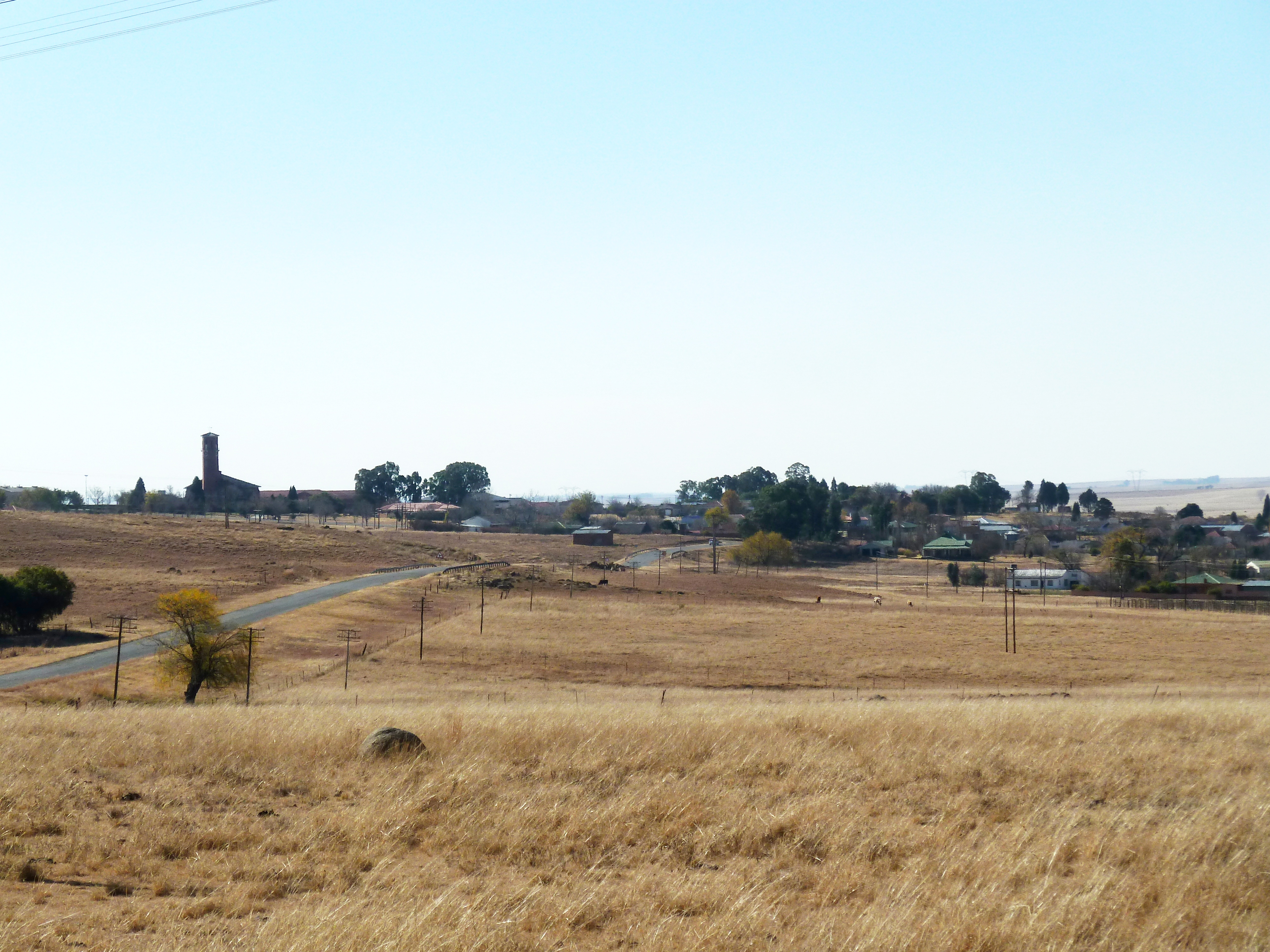
Cornelia in the Riemland region

The Free State is situated on a succession of flat grassy plains sprinkled with pastureland, resting on a general elevation of 3,800 feet only broken by the occasional hill or kopje. The rich soil and pleasant climate allow for a thriving agricultural industry.

The province is high-lying, with almost all land being 1,000 metres above sea level. The Drakensberg and Maloti Mountains foothills raise the terrain to over 2,000 m in the east. The Free State lies in the heart of the Karoo Sequence of rocks, containing shales, mudstones, sandstones and the Drakensberg Basalt forming the youngest capping rocks. Mineral deposits are plentiful, with gold and diamonds being of particular importance, mostly found in the north and west of the province.

=== Fauna and flora ===
The flats in the south of the reserve provide ideal conditions for large herds of plain game such as black wildebeest and springbok. The ridges, koppies and plains typical of the northern section are home to kudu, red hartebeest, southern white rhinoceros and buffalo. The Southern African wildcat, black wildebeest, zebra, eland, white rhinoceros and wild dog can be seen at the Soetdoring Nature Reserve near Bloemfontein. The South African cheetahs were reintroduced in the Free State for the first time in June 2013 after a hundred years of regional extinction, at Laohu Valley Reserve near Philippolis. Following the reintroduction of an adult female South African cheetah in early 2016, three wild cheetah cubs were born for the first time in Laohu Valley Reserve in February 2017, making the three new cubs the first cheetahs born in the wild since their disappearance from the Free State province in over a century.

=== Climate ===
The Free State experiences a continental climate, characterised by warm to hot summers and cool to cold winters. Areas in the east experience frequent snowfalls, especially on the higher ranges, whilst the west can be extremely hot in summer. Almost all precipitation falls in the summer months as brief afternoon thunderstorms, with aridity increasing towards the west. Areas in the east around Harrismith, Bethlehem and Ficksburg are well watered. The capital, Bloemfontein, experiences hot, moist summers and cold, dry winters frequented by severe frost.

- Bloemfontein averages: January maximum: 31 °C (min: 15 °C), July maximum: 17 °C (min: -2 °C), annual precipitation: 559 mm
- Bethlehem averages: January maximum: 27 °C (min: 13 °C), July maximum: 16 °C (min: -2 °C), annual precipitation: 680 mm

=== Borders ===
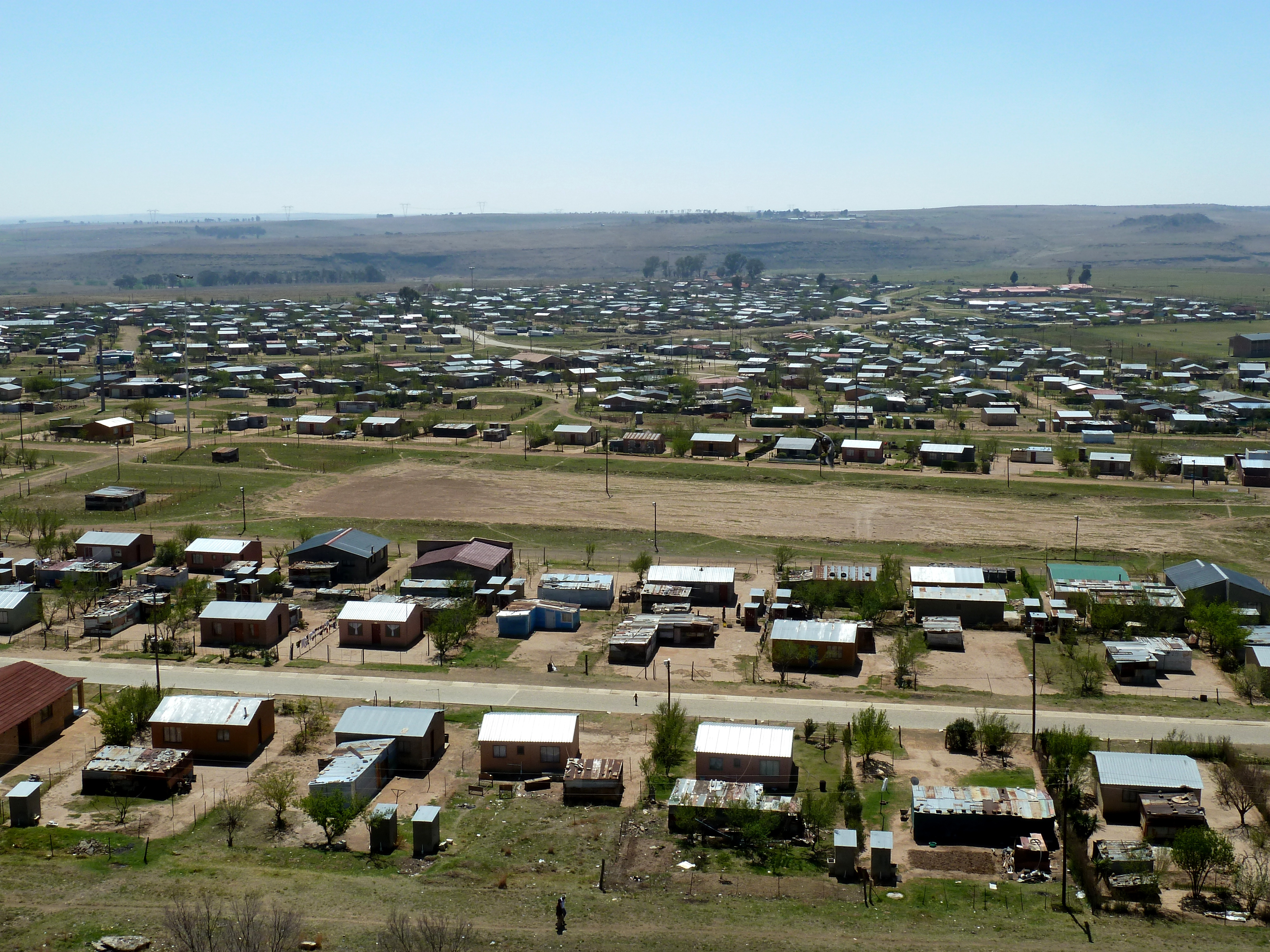
Mafahlaneng township at Tweeling

In the southeast, the Free State borders seven districts of Lesotho:

- Mokhotlong – farthest to the east
- Butha-Buthe – northwest of Mokhotlong and northeast of Leribe
- Leribe – southwest of Butha-Buthe and northeast of Berea
- Berea – southwest of Leribe and north of Maseru
- Maseru – south of Berea and northeast of Mafeteng
- Mafeteng – southwest of Maseru and northwest of Mohale's Hoek
- Mohale's Hoek – southeast of Mafeteng

Domestically, it borders the following provinces:

- KwaZulu-Natal – east
- Eastern Cape – south
- Northern Cape – west
- North West – northwest
- Gauteng – north
- Mpumalanga – northeast

The Free State borders more districts of Lesotho and more provinces of South Africa than any other province.

It is traversed by the northwesterly line of equal latitude and longitude.

== Demographics ==
Population density in the Free State <1 /km² 1–3 /km² 3–10 /km² 10–30 /km² 30–100 /km² 100–300 /km² 300–1000 /km² 1000–3000 /km² >3000 /km²

Dominant home languages in the Free State Afrikaans English Xhosa Sotho Tswana Zulu No language dominant

As of the 2022 census, the Free State had a population of 2,961,864, an increase of 8.0% from the prior census in 2011. It recorded the slowest population growth among South Africa's nine provinces between 2011 and 2022. It is also the second-least populous and second-least densely populated province. The median age is 28, an increase of 3 years from 2011.

=== Race/Ethnicity ===
In the 2022 census, 88.9% of the population described themselves as Black African, 8.0% as White, 2.6% as Coloured, and 0.4% as Indian/Asian. The majority of the population are black Africans who speak Sotho as a first language. The vast majority of White people in the Free State are Afrikaners.

Historic Breakdown of Population by Group
Population Group	1996	2001	2011	2022
Black African	84.8%	88.0%	87.6%	88.9%
White	12.1%	8.8%	8.7%	8.0%
Coloured	3.0%	3.1%	3.1%	2.6%
Indian/Asian	0.1%	0.1%	0.4%	0.4%
Other	n/a	n/a	0.2%	0.2%

The proportion of whites in the province has shrunk considerably since the nineteenth century. In 1880 the white population made up 45.7% of the total population. In 1904 this had fallen to 36.8%. Of the 142,679 people in 1904, only 60% were born in the province. Of the 2,726 European immigrants born in non-British states, 1,025 came from the Russian Empire, mainly Jews. In 1904 whites made up a majority in most settlements, namely Ficksburg (52.3%), Wepener (60.2%), Ladybrand (60.0%), and Kroonstad (51.6%), and made up a substantial minority in Bloemfontein (45.7%) and Winburg (36.3%).

=== Languages ===
In the 2022 census, 72.3% of the population reported their first language as Sotho, 10.3% as Afrikaans, 5.5% as Xhosa, 5.3% as Setswana, and 1.5% as English. The Free State is the only province in which native Sotho-speakers form a majority of the population. It is also the province with the third-highest proportion of Afrikaans speakers, after the Western Cape and the Northern Cape.

Sesotho is the dominant home language in most of the province. Zulu is the major language in the far eastern municipality of Phumelela. Setswana is the main language in Tokologo in the northwest, and in and around the area of Thaba Nchu. Afrikaans is widely spoken throughout the province, as a first language for the majority of whites and coloureds (who constitute a minority) and as a second or third language by Sesotho, Setswana and Xhosa speakers. Although there are relatively few native English speakers, English is becoming increasingly important as the language of business and government. This is evidenced by the shift of tertiary institutions such as the University of the Free State from solely using Afrikaans as the medium of instruction to using both Afrikaans and English, and eventually only English.

=== Religion ===
The population of the Free State is overwhelmingly Christian. As of the 2022 census, 92.7% of the population described themselves as Christians, the third-highest proportion among South Africa's provinces. Among other religions, 4.9% of the population stated that they practiced Traditional African religions, and 0.5% of the population described themselves as Muslim. 1.4% of the population described themselves as being atheist, agnostic, or having no religious affiliation.

=== Education ===
Approximately 34.3% of learners aged 0 $-$ 4 did not attend any type of Early Childhood Development(ECD) programme. According to the 2022 census, 76.8% of persons aged 5 $-$ 24 were attending an educational institution. The overall percentage shows an increase in the percentage of attendance from the 2011 census, increasing from 73.1%. The 2022 census had a sample size of 1 763 343 individuals aged 20 and above from Free State, and only 5.0% had no schooling, while 4.1% had completed primary, 36.5% completed secondary and 10.2% attaining post school educational training.

== Municipalities ==
Free State districts and local municipalities

The Free State Province is divided into one metropolitan municipality and four district municipalities. The district municipalities are in turn divided into 19 local municipalities:

=== Metropolitan municipalities ===
- Mangaung Metropolitan Municipality

=== District municipalities ===
- Fezile Dabi District
  - Moqhaka
  - Ngwathe
  - Metsimaholo
  - Mafube
- Thabo Mofutsanyana District
  - Setsoto
  - Dihlabeng
  - Maluti-a-Phofung
  - Nketoana
  - Phumelela
  - Mantsopa
- Lejweleputswa District
  - Masilonyana
  - Tokologo
  - Tswelopele
  - Matjhabeng
  - Nala
- Xhariep District
  - Letsemeng
  - Kopanong
  - Mohokare

=== Major cities and towns ===
The Free State's major towns include:

- Bloemfontein & Botshabelo in Mangaung Metropolitan Municipality
- Welkom, Odendaalsrus and Virginia in Lejweleputswa
- Bethlehem, Harrismith and Phuthaditjhaba in Thabo Mofutsanyana
- Kroonstad, Sasolburg and Parys in Fezile Dabi

== Government and politics ==
=== Government ===
The Free State provincial government is based in Bloemfontein, the provincial capital. The Free State Division of the High Court of South Africa also sits in Bloemfontein.

Like South Africa's other provinces, the Free State has a parliamentary system of government, with the provincial premier elected by the Free State Provincial Legislature. The premier then selects the members of the provincial Executive Council (cabinet). The current premier is Maqueen Letsoha-Mathae of the African National Congress (ANC), who has held the position since 2024.

The provincial legislature is elected every five years by a system of party-list proportional representation and meets at the Vierde Raadsaal in Bloemfontein.

=== Politics ===
The politics of the Free State has been dominated by the ANC since the end of Apartheid. The ANC has won a majority of the vote in every provincial election since 1994.

The most recent provincial election was held in 2024. The ANC again won the election, albeit with a sharply reduced majority. The Democratic Alliance (DA) retained its position as the province's second largest party and official opposition, with a significant increase in its share of the vote.

The results of the 2024 provincial election are as follows:

Party	Votes	%	+/–	Seats	+/–
African National Congress	429,241	51.87	▼9.27	16	▼3
Democratic Alliance	181,062	21.88	▲4.30	7	▲1
Economic Freedom Fighters	111,850	13.52	▲0.94	4	0
Freedom Front Plus	24,933	3.01	▼0.95	1	0
uMkhonto weSizwe	15,985	1.93	New	1	New
African Congress for Transformation	15,120	1.83	New	1	New
Patriotic Alliance	11,730	1.42	▲0.86	0	0
African Transformation Movement	5,874	0.71	▼0.07	0	0
ActionSA	4,503	0.54	New	0	New
African Content Movement	4,414	0.53	▲0.32	0	0
African Christian Democratic Party	3,967	0.48	▲0.06	0	0
Build One South Africa	2,916	0.35	New	0	New
Rise Mzansi	2,348	0.28	New	0	New
Pan Africanist Congress of Azania	1,970	0.24	▲0.07	0	0
Congress of the People	1,860	0.22	▼0.23	0	0
Inkatha Freedom Party	1,537	0.19	▲0.11	0	0
Arise South Africa	1,453	0.18	New	0	New
United Africans Transformation	1,408	0.17	New	0	New
Forum 4 Service Delivery	1,193	0.14	New	0	New
United Democratic Movement	986	0.12	▲0.03	0	0
African People's Convention	672	0.08	▼0.07	0	0
Abantu Batho Congress	560	0.07	New	0	New
Sesing Johannes Ramotswabodi	558	0.07	New	0	New
Good	483	0.06	▼0.02	0	0
All Citizens Party	469	0.06	New	0	New
National Freedom Party	241	0.03	0.00	0	0
African Movement Congress	179	0.02	New	0	New
Total	827,512	100.00	–	30	–
Valid votes	827,512	99.01			
Invalid/blank votes	8,280	0.99			
Total votes	835,792	100.00			
Registered voters/turnout	1,456,927	57.37			
Source: Electoral Commission of South Africa

== Health ==
The Free State is the only province in South Africa that operates a free 24-hour dedicated rotor-wing aeromedical service from a public hospital. They are able to reach far-flung areas in only 45 minutes and deliver a high level of care on scene. On 31 October 2018, Free State Emergency Medical Service launched an additional 65 road ambulances to augment the fleet.

The Free State has many public and private hospitals.

== Economy ==
The province is the granary of South Africa, with agriculture central to its economy, while mining on the rich goldfields reef is its largest employer.

=== Agriculture ===
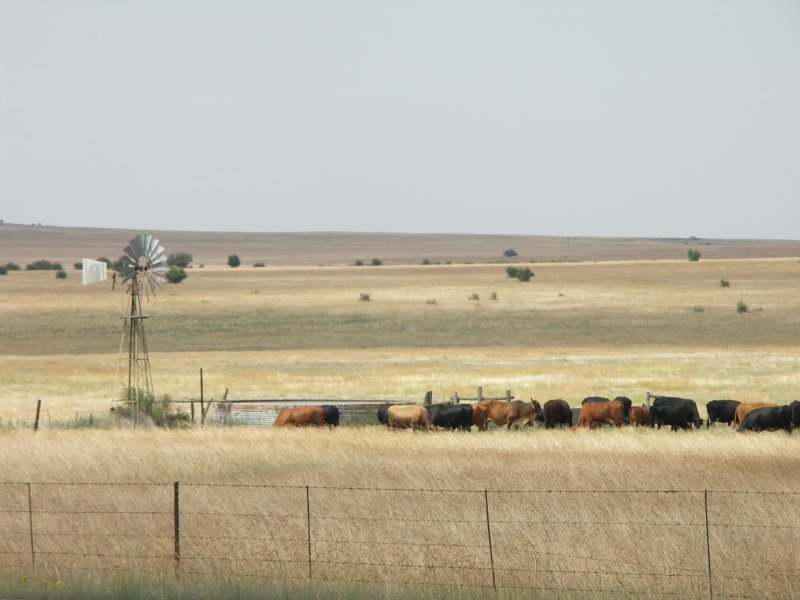
Cattle grazing near Winburg

Agriculture dominates the Free State landscape, with cultivated land covering 32,000 square kilometres, and natural veld and grazing a further 87,000 square kilometres of the province. It is also South Africa's leader in the production of biofuels, or fuel from agricultural crops, with a number of ethanol plants under construction in the grain-producing western region. South Africa is one of the top ten maize producers in the world (12,365,000 tons as of 2013).

Field crops yield almost two-thirds of the gross agricultural income of the province. Animal products contribute a further 30%, with the balance generated by horticulture. Ninety percent of the country's cherry crop is produced in the Ficksburg district, which is also home to the country's two largest asparagus canning factories. Soya, sorghum, sunflowers and wheat are cultivated in the eastern Free State, where farmers specialise in seed production. About 40% of the country's potato yield comes from the province's high-lying areas.

The main vegetable crop is asparagus, both white and green varieties. Although horticulture is expanding and becoming increasingly export-orientated, most produce leaves the province unprocessed.

The Free State's advantage in floriculture is the opposing seasons of the southern and northern hemispheres.

=== Mining ===
The Free State is also rich in mineral wealth, gold representing 20% of the world's total gold production. Mining is the province's major employer. The province has 12 gold mines, producing 30% of South Africa's output and making it the fifth-largest producer of gold in the world. The Harmony Gold Refinery and Rand Refinery are the only two gold refineries in South Africa.

Gold mines in the Free State also supply a substantial portion of the total silver produced in the country, while considerable concentrations of uranium occurring in the gold-bearing conglomerates of the goldfields are extracted as a byproduct.

Bituminous coal is also mined, and converted to petrochemicals at Sasolburg. The Free State also produces high-quality diamonds from its kimberlite pipes and fissures, and the country's largest deposit of bentonite is found in the Koppies district.

=== Industry ===
Since 1989, the Free State economy has moved from dependence on primary sectors such as mining and agriculture to an economy increasingly oriented towards manufacturing and export. Some 14% of the province's manufacturing is classified as being in high-technology industries – the highest of all provincial economies. The northern Free State's chemicals sector is one of the most important in the southern hemisphere. Petrochemicals company Sasol, based in the town of Sasolburg, is a world leader in the production of fuels, waxes, chemicals and low-cost feedstock from coal.

=== Tourism ===
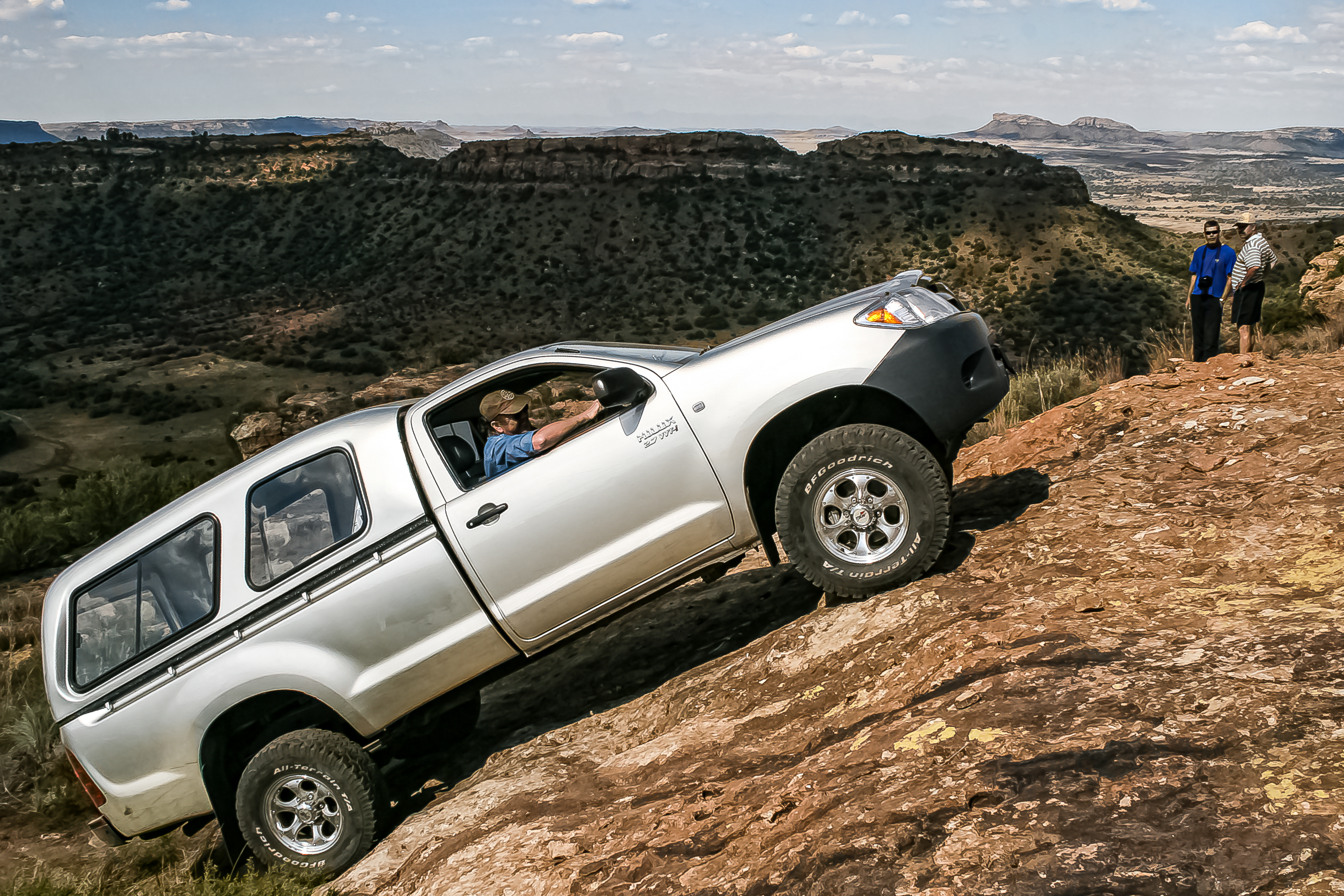
On top of Koranaberg

In the northeastern Free State, nestled in the rolling foothills of the Maluti mountains, the Golden Gate Highlands National Park is the province's prime tourist attraction. The park gets its name from the brilliant shades of gold cast by the sun on the spectacular sandstone cliffs, especially the imposing Brandwag or Sentinel Rock, which keeps vigil over the park.

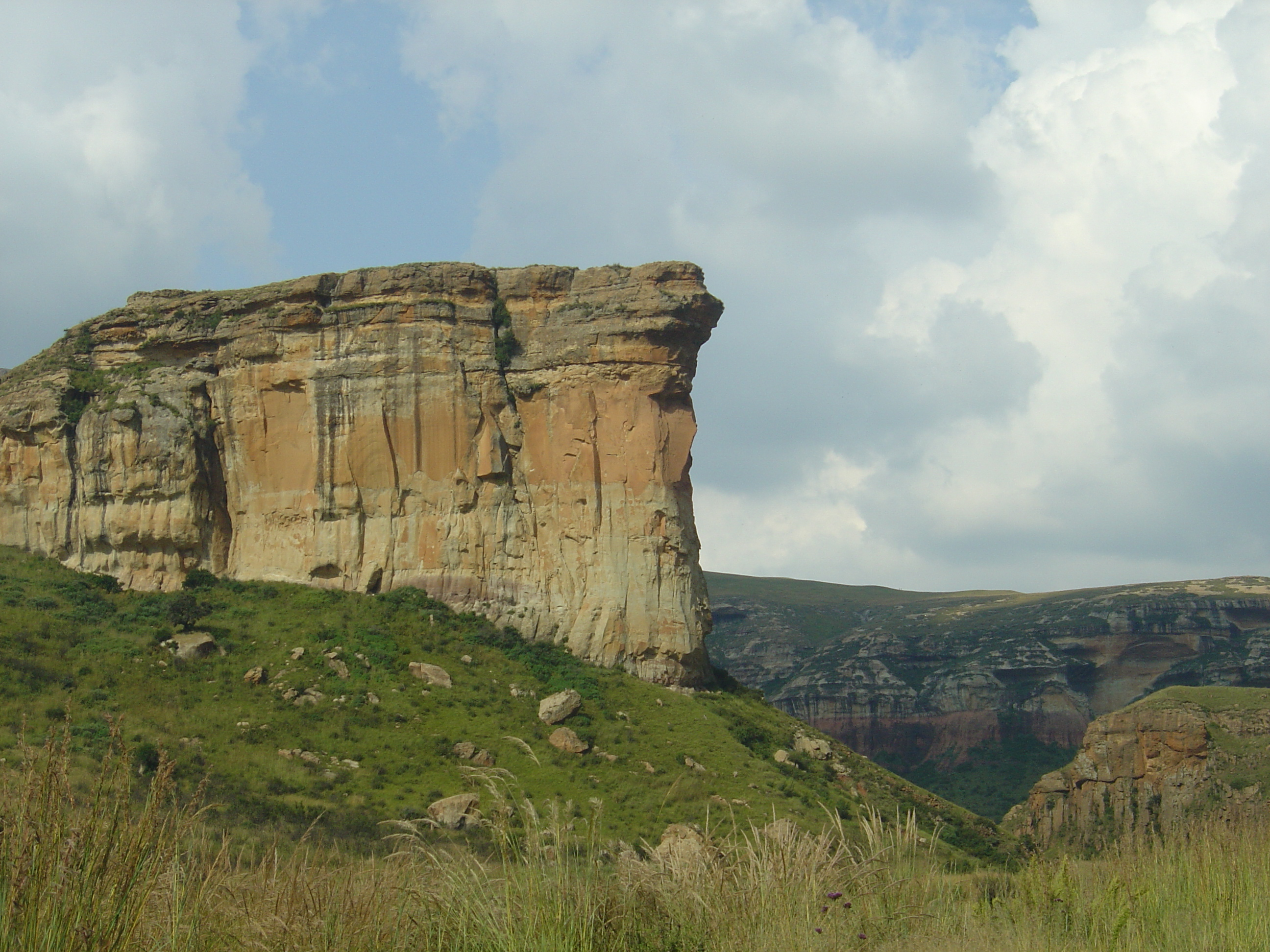
Brandwag (The Sentinel)

The sandstone of this region has been used for the dressed-stone buildings found on the Eastern Highlands, while decoratively painted Sotho houses dot the grasslands. Some of South Africa's most valued San (Bushman) rock art is found in the Free State, particularly in the regions around Clarens, Bethlehem, Ficksburg, Ladybrand and Wepener.

== Education ==
=== Universities ===
- University of the Free State (Bloemfontein, Phuthaditjhaba)
- Central University of Technology (Bloemfontein, Welkom)

=== Other educational institutions ===
- Akademia (Bloemfontein)
- Damelin (Bloemfontein)
- Flavius Mareka FET College (Kroonstad, Mphohadi, Sasolburg)
- Qualitas Career Academy (Bloemfontein)

== Conservation ==
The Free State is home to the Vredefort Dome which is a UNESCO World Heritage Site. Not only is the Vredefort Dome the oldest and largest meteorite impact known in earth's history, but it is also the most corroded.

=== Botanical Garden ===
- Free State National Botanical Garden (Bloemfontein)

=== Museum ===
- National Museum (Bloemfontein)
- Anglo-Boer War Museum (Bloemfontein)

== Media ==
=== Newspapers ===
- Die Volksblad (Bloemfontein)

=== Radio ===
- Lesedi FM
- OFM
- Motheo FM
- Radio Rosestad 100.6 FM

== Sports ==
=== Provincial sport teams ===
- Soccer
  - African Warriors (Phuthaditjhaba)
  - Carara Kicks F.C. (Welkom)
  - Bloemfontein Celtic (Bloemfontein)
  - Roses United
  - Bloemfontein Young Tigers
- Rugby
    - Cheetahs (Bloemfontein)
  - Currie Cup:
    - Free State Cheetahs (Bloemfontein)
    - Griffons (Welkom)
- Cricket
  - Knights (Bloemfontein)
