= Fezile Dabi District Municipality =

Fezile Dabi Northern Free State
- District municipality
- Seal

- Location of Fezile Dabi District Municipality within Free State
- Coordinates: 26°49′S 27°49′E
- Country: South Africa
- Province: Free State
- Seat: Sasolburg
- Local municipalities: List: Moqhaka; Ngwathe; Metsimaholo; Mafube

Government
  - Type: Municipal council
  - Mayor: Jonas Ramokhoase (ANC)

Area
  - Total: 20,668 km^{2} (7,980 sq mi)

Population (2021)
  - Total: 527,788
  - Density: 25.536/km^{2} (66.139/sq mi)

Racial makeup (2021)
  - Black African: 85.28%
  - Coloured: 2.06%
  - Indian/Asian: 0.49
  - White: 12.17%

First languages (2011)
  - Sotho: 67.3%
  - Afrikaans: 13.8%
  - Xhosa: 6.0%
  - Zulu: 5.6%
  - Other: 7.3%
- Time zone: UTC+2 (SAST)
- Municipal code: DC20

The Fezile Dabi District Municipality (Sotho: Masepala wa Setereke wa Fezile Dabi; Afrikaans: Fezile Dabi-distriktsmunisipaliteit),with the code DC20, is one of the 5 districts of the Free State province of South Africa.

== History ==
Established in the year 2000, the Fezile Dabi District Municipality was formerly known as the Northern Free State District Municipality and was officially changed on the 3 March 2005.

== Geography ==
=== Neighbours ===
Northern Free State is surrounded by:

- Sedibeng in Gauteng to the north (DC42)
- Gert Sibande in Mpumalanga to the north-east (DC30)
- Thabo Mofutsanyane to the south-east (DC19)
- Lejweleputswa to the south-west (DC18)
- Dr Kenneth Kaunda in North-West to the north-west (DC40)

=== Local municipalities ===
The district contains the following local municipalities:

Local municipality	Population	%	Dominant language
Moqhaka	167 886	36.47%	Sotho
Ngwathe	118 820	25.81%	Sotho
Metsimaholo	115 964	25.19%	Sotho
Mafube	57 637	12.52%	Sotho

== Demographics ==
According to the 2022 census, the district had a total population of 509,912 . This was an increase from a population of 488,036 in 2011.

=== Sex ===
As of the 2022 census, the female and male population was 265,174 and 244,738 respectively.

Distribution of population by sex, Census 2011,2022
Sex	2011	2022
Female	245 694	265 174
Male	242 342	244 738

=== Age ===
Age	Population	%
000 - 004	41 558	9.03%
005 - 009	43 971	9.55%
010 - 014	49 984	10.86%
015 - 019	51 062	11.09%
020 - 024	42 606	9.26%
025 - 029	39 124	8.50%
030 - 034	34 867	7.58%
035 - 039	32 496	7.06%
040 - 044	28 301	6.15%
045 - 049	24 171	5.25%
050 - 054	19 601	4.26%
055 - 059	14 915	3.24%
060 - 064	12 049	2.62%
065 - 069	9 577	2.08%
070 - 074	7 059	1.53%
075 - 079	4 119	0.89%
080 - 084	2 922	0.63%
085 - 089	1 249	0.27%
090 - 094	469	0.10%
095 - 099	132	0.03%
100 plus	57	0.01%

== Politics ==
=== Election results ===
Election results for Northern Free State in the South African general election, 2004.

- Population 18 and over: 293 994 [63.87% of total population]
- Total votes: 182 833 [39.72% of total population]
- Voting % estimate: 62.19% votes as a % of population 18 and over

Party	Votes	%
African National Congress	146 691	80.23%
Democratic Alliance	20 395	11.15%
Freedom Front Plus	4 210	2.30%
United Democratic Movement	2 326	1.27%
African Christian Democratic Party	2 265	1.24%
New National Party	1 511	0.83%
Pan African Congress	1 449	0.79%
Independent Democrats	1 097	0.60%
Azanian People's Organisation	894	0.49%
Inkhata Freedom Party	749	0.41%
United Christian Democratic Party	301	0.16%
SOPA	203	0.11%
NA	167	0.09%
CDP	126	0.07%
EMSA	109	0.06%
PJC	94	0.05%
UF	84	0.05%
TOP	60	0.03%
KISS	35	0.02%
NLP	34	0.02%
Minority Front	33	0.02%
Total	182 833	100.00%
