= List of cities and towns in Gauteng =

This is a list of cities and towns in Gauteng Province, South Africa. Most towns are no longer separate municipalities, their local governments having been merged into larger structures.

In the case of settlements that have had their official names changed the traditional name is listed first followed by the new name.

== City of Johannesburg Metropolitan Municipality ==
- Alexandra
- Diepsloot
- Ennerdale
- Johannesburg
- Lenasia
- Modderfontein
- Midrand
- Orange Farm
- Drieziek
- Randburg
- Roodepoort
- Sandton
- Soweto

== City of Ekurhuleni Metropolitan Municipality ==
- Alberton
- Bedfordview
- Benoni
- Boksburg
- Brakpan
- Bapsfontein
- Clayville
- Daveyton
- Duduza
- Edenvale
- Holfontein (Etwatwa)
- Germiston
- Isando
- Katlehong
- Kempton Park
- KwaThema
- Dunnottar
- Nigel
- Reiger Park
- Springs
- Tembisa (Thembisa)
- Tokoza (Thokoza)
- Tsakane
- Vosloorus
- Wattville

== City of Tshwane Metropolitan Municipality ==
- Atteridgeville
- Bronberg
- Bronkhorstspruit
- Centurion (Verwoerdburg until 1994)
- Cullinan
- Ekangala
- Ga-Rankuwa
- Hammanskraal
- Irene
- Mabopane
- Mamelodi
- Pretoria
- Rayton
- Refilwe
- Soshanguve
- Winterveld
- Zithobeni

== Sedibeng District Municipality ==
=== Emfuleni Local Municipality ===
- Boipatong
- Bophelong
- Evaton
- Sebokeng
- Sharpeville
- Vanderbijlpark
- Vereeniging

=== Midvaal Local Municipality ===
- Meyerton
- Randvaal
- Walkerville

=== Lesedi Local Municipality ===
- Devon
- Heidelberg
- Impumelelo
- Ratanda

== West Rand District Municipality ==
=== Merafong City Local Municipality ===
- Carletonville
- Khutsong
- Fochville
- Kokosi
- Greenspark
- Wedela
- Welverdiend
- Blybank

=== Mogale City Local Municipality ===
- Hekpoort
- Kagiso
- Kromdraai
- Krugersdorp
- Magaliesburg
- Muldersdrift
- Munsieville
- Rietvallei
- Silverfields
- Tarlton

=== Randfontein Local Municipality ===
- Bhongweni
- Brandvlei
- Mohlakeng
- Panvlak Gold Mine
- Randfontein
- Toekomsrus
- Zenzele

=== Westonaria Local Municipality ===
- Bekkersdal
- Westonaria
- Simunye, Westonaria
- Borwa, Westonaria

== Sortable Table ==
City/Town	Local Municipality	District Municipality	Metropolitan Municipality
Alexandra			City of Johannesburg Metropolitan Municipality
Johannesburg			City of Johannesburg Metropolitan Municipality
Lenasia			City of Johannesburg Metropolitan Municipality
Midrand			City of Johannesburg Metropolitan Municipality
Randburg			City of Johannesburg Metropolitan Municipality
Roodepoort			City of Johannesburg Metropolitan Municipality
Sandton			City of Johannesburg Metropolitan Municipality
Soweto			City of Johannesburg Metropolitan Municipality
Alberton			City of Ekurhuleni Metropolitan Municipality
Germiston			City of Ekurhuleni Metropolitan Municipality
Benoni			City of Ekurhuleni Metropolitan Municipality
Boksburg			City of Ekurhuleni Metropolitan Municipality
Brakpan			City of Ekurhuleni Metropolitan Municipality
Daveyton			City of Ekurhuleni Metropolitan Municipality
Devon			City of Ekurhuleni Metropolitan Municipality
Duduza			City of Ekurhuleni Metropolitan Municipality
Edenvale			City of Ekurhuleni Metropolitan Municipality
Germiston			City of Ekurhuleni Metropolitan Municipality
Impumelelo			City of Ekurhuleni Metropolitan Municipality
Isando			City of Ekurhuleni Metropolitan Municipality
Katlehong			City of Ekurhuleni Metropolitan Municipality
Kempton Park			City of Ekurhuleni Metropolitan Municipality
KwaThema			City of Ekurhuleni Metropolitan Municipality
Nigel			City of Ekurhuleni Metropolitan Municipality
Reiger Park			City of Ekurhuleni Metropolitan Municipality
Springs			City of Ekurhuleni Metropolitan Municipality
Tembisa			City of Ekurhuleni Metropolitan Municipality
Thokoza			City of Ekurhuleni Metropolitan Municipality
Tsakane			City of Ekurhuleni Metropolitan Municipality
Vosloorus			City of Ekurhuleni Metropolitan Municipality
Wattville			City of Ekurhuleni Metropolitan Municipality
Atteridgeville			City of Tshwane Metropolitan Municipality
Bronkhorstspruit			City of Tshwane Metropolitan Municipality
Centurion			City of Tshwane Metropolitan Municipality
Cullinan			City of Tshwane Metropolitan Municipality
Ekangala			City of Tshwane Metropolitan Municipality
Hammanskraal			City of Tshwane Metropolitan Municipality
Irene			City of Tshwane Metropolitan Municipality
Mamelodi			City of Tshwane Metropolitan Municipality
Pretoria			City of Tshwane Metropolitan Municipality
Refilwe			City of Tshwane Metropolitan Municipality
Soshanguve			City of Tshwane Metropolitan Municipality
Zithobeni			City of Tshwane Metropolitan Municipality
Boipatong	Emfuleni Local Municipality	Sedibeng District Municipality	
Bophelong	Emfuleni Local Municipality	Sedibeng District Municipality	
Evaton	Emfuleni Local Municipality	Sedibeng District Municipality	
Sebokeng	Emfuleni Local Municipality	Sedibeng District Municipality	
Sharpeville	Emfuleni Local Municipality	Sedibeng District Municipality	
Vanderbijlpark	Emfuleni Local Municipality	Sedibeng District Municipality	
Vereeniging	Emfuleni Local Municipality	Sedibeng District Municipality	
Meyerton	Midvaal Local Municipality	Sedibeng District Municipality	
Heidelberg	Lesedi Local Municipality	Sedibeng District Municipality	
Ratanda	Lesedi Local Municipality	Sedibeng District Municipality	
Carletonville	Merafong City Local Municipality	West Rand District Municipality	
Khutsong	Merafong City Local Municipality	West Rand District Municipality	
Kagiso	Mogale City Local Municipality	West Rand District Municipality	
Kromdraai	Mogale City Local Municipality	West Rand District Municipality	
Krugersdorp	Mogale City Local Municipality	West Rand District Municipality	
Magaliesburg	Mogale City Local Municipality	West Rand District Municipality	
Muldersdrift	Mogale City Local Municipality	West Rand District Municipality	
Mohlakeng	Randfontein Local Municipality	West Rand District Municipality	
Randfontein	Randfontein Local Municipality	West Rand District Municipality	
Bekkersdal	Westonaria Local Municipality	West Rand District Municipality	
Westonaria	Westonaria Local Municipality	West Rand District Municipality	
