= List of municipalities in Gauteng =

Map of the municipalities in Gauteng

Gauteng province of South Africa is divided, for local government purposes, into three metropolitan municipalities and two district municipalities. The district metro are in turn divided into six local municipalities.

== District and metropolitan municipalities ==
Name	Code	Seat	Area (km^{2})	Population (2016)	Pop. density (per km^{2})
City of Ekurhuleni Metropolitan Municipality	EKU	Germiston	1,975	3,379,104	1,710.6
City of Johannesburg Metropolitan Municipality	JHB	Johannesburg	1,645	4,949,347	3,008.8
City of Tshwane Metropolitan Municipality	TSH	Pretoria	6,298	3,275,152	520.0
Sedibeng District Municipality	DC42	Vereeniging	4,173	957,528	229.5
West Rand District Municipality	DC48	Randfontein	4,087	838,594	205.2

== Local municipalities ==
Name	Code	District	Seat	Area (km^{2})	Population (2016)	Pop. density (per km^{2})
Emfuleni Local Municipality	GT421	Sedibeng	Vanderbijlpark	966	733,445	759.3
Midvaal Local Municipality	GT422	Sedibeng	Meyerton	1,722	111,612	64.8
Lesedi Local Municipality	GT423	Sedibeng	Heidelberg	1,484	112,472	75.8
Mogale City Local Municipality	GT481	West Rand	Krugersdorp	1,3428494	383,864	286.0
Merafong City Local Municipality	GT484	West Rand	Carletonville	1,631	188,843	115.8
Rand West City Local Municipality	GT485	West Rand	Randfontein	1,115	265,887	238.5

== Former municipalities ==
These municipalities have been dissolved since the current system of local government was established in 2000.

Name	Code	Dissolved	Fate
Metsweding District Municipality	DC46	18 May 2011	Incorporated into the City of Tshwane Metropolitan Municipality
Nokeng tsa Taemane Local Municipality	GT461	18 May 2011	Incorporated into the City of Tshwane Metropolitan Municipality
Kungwini Local Municipality	GT462	18 May 2011	Incorporated into the City of Tshwane Metropolitan Municipality
Randfontein Local Municipality	GT482	3 August 2016	Merged to create Rand West City Local Municipality
Westonaria Local Municipality	GT483	3 August 2016	Merged to create Rand West City Local Municipality
