= Rand West City Local Municipality elections =

Local elections in Gauteng, South Africa

The Rand West City Local Municipality council consists of 69 members elected by mixed-member proportional representation. 35 councillors are elected by first-past-the-post voting in 35 wards, while the remaining 34 are chosen from party lists so that the total number of party representatives is proportional to the number of votes received.

It was established for the August 2016 local elections by the merging of Randfontein and Westonaria local municipalities. It is a division of the West Rand District Municipality.

In the election of 4 November 2026, no party won a majority. The African National Congress (ANC) won the largest number of seats on the council.

== Results ==
The following table shows the composition of the council after past elections.

Event	ACDP	ANC	APO	DA	EFF	FF+	IFP	PA	RPP	Other	Total
2016 election	0	37	1	19	8	1	1	0	2	0	69
2021 election	1	32	1	16	11	3	1	1	1	2	69
2026 election	1	24	1	16	6	3	0	2	—	16	69

== August 2016 election ==
The following table shows the results of the 2016 election.

Party	Ward			List			Total seats
Party	Votes	%	Seats	Votes	%	Seats	Total seats
African National Congress	39,954	52.64	27	39,865	52.66	10	37
Democratic Alliance	20,500	27.01	8	20,313	26.83	11	19
Economic Freedom Fighters	9,110	12.00	0	9,031	11.93	8	8
Randfontein Peoples Party	2,429	3.20	0	2,537	3.35	2	2
Freedom Front Plus	1,254	1.65	0	1,122	1.48	1	1
Azanian People's Organisation	789	1.04	0	757	1.00	1	1
Inkatha Freedom Party	701	0.92	0	724	0.96	1	1
Congress of the People	359	0.47	0	348	0.46	0	0
United Democratic Movement	224	0.30	0	326	0.43	0	0
Patriotic Alliance	240	0.32	0	252	0.33	0	0
African Christian Democratic Party	114	0.15	0	264	0.35	0	0
International Revelation Congress	101	0.13	0	163	0.22	0	0
Independent candidates	105	0.14	0				0
Pan Africanist Congress of Azania	27	0.04	0				0
Total	75,907	100.00	35	75,702	100.00	34	69
Valid votes	75,907	98.59		75,702	98.47		
Invalid/blank votes	1,086	1.41		1,180	1.53		
Total votes	76,993	100.00		76,882	100.00		
Registered voters/turnout	136,276	56.50		136,276	56.42		

== November 2021 election ==
The following table shows the results of the 2021 election.

Party	Ward			List			Total seats
Party	Votes	%	Seats	Votes	%	Seats	Total seats
African National Congress	24,410	44.44	27	25,253	46.22	5	32
Democratic Alliance	12,629	22.99	8	12,569	23.01	8	16
Economic Freedom Fighters	7,953	14.48	0	8,537	15.63	11	11
Freedom Front Plus	2,092	3.81	0	2,135	3.91	3	3
Patriotic Alliance	1,513	2.75	0	1,571	2.88	2	2
Independent candidates	2,618	4.77	0				0
Azanian People's Organisation	715	1.30	0	662	1.21	1	1
Randfontein Peoples Party	574	1.04	0	756	1.38	1	1
African Independent Congress	488	0.89	0	654	1.20	1	1
Inkatha Freedom Party	423	0.77	0	562	1.03	1	1
African Christian Democratic Party	410	0.75	0	480	0.88	1	1
Congress of the People	299	0.54	0	287	0.53	0	0
United Democratic Movement	271	0.49	0	303	0.55	0	0
African Transformation Movement	216	0.39	0	289	0.53	0	0
Forum for Service Delivery	80	0.15	0	177	0.32	0	0
Party of Action	106	0.19	0	131	0.24	0	0
United Christian Democratic Party	55	0.10	0	134	0.25	0	0
National Freedom Party	47	0.09	0	75	0.14	0	0
South African Royal Kingdoms Organization	31	0.06	0	60	0.11	0	0
Total	54,930	100.00	35	54,635	100.00	34	69
Valid votes	54,930	98.08		54,635	97.22		
Invalid/blank votes	1,074	1.92		1,564	2.78		
Total votes	56,004	100.00		56,199	100.00		
Registered voters/turnout	131,921	42.45		131,921	42.60		

=== By-elections from November 2021 ===
The following by-elections were held to fill vacant ward seats in the period from the election in November 2021.

Date	Ward	Party of the previous councillor	Party of the newly elected councillor
31 May 2022	4	African National Congress	Economic Freedom Fighters
13 Dec 2023	17	African National Congress	African National Congress
24 Apr 2024	3	Democratic Alliance	Democratic Alliance
13 Dec 2023	35	African National Congress	African National Congress
16 Apr 2025	6	Democratic Alliance	Democratic Alliance

== November 2026 election ==
The following table shows the results of the 2026 election.

Party	Ward			List			Total seats
Party	Votes	%	Seats	Votes	%	Seats	Total seats
African National Congress	23,795	32.99	24	23,529	32.65	0	24
Democratic Alliance	17,288	23.97	10	17,167	23.82	6	16
Economic Freedom Fighters	6,439	8.93	0	6,471	8.98	6	6
uMkhonto weSizwe Party	6,269	8.69	0	5,958	8.27	6	6
ActionSA	4,545	6.30	0	5,292	7.34	5	5
Freedom Front Plus	3,028	4.20	0	3,325	4.61	3	3
South African Communist Party	2,756	3.82	1	2,847	3.95	2	3
Patriotic Alliance	2,309	3.20	0	2,256	3.13	2	2
Azanian People's Organisation	788	1.09	0	822	1.14	1	1
African Christian Democratic Party	629	0.87	0	530	0.74	1	1
African Transformation Movement	479	0.66	0	634	0.88	1	1
Rand West Peoples Party	528	0.73	0	551	0.76	1	1
African Independent Congress	456	0.63	0	622	0.86	0	0
Afrika Mayibuye Movement	558	0.77	0	405	0.56	0	0
Inkatha Freedom Party	349	0.48	0	432	0.60	0	0
Independent candidates	574	0.80	0				0
Build One South Africa	231	0.32	0	223	0.31	0	0
Pan Africanist Congress of Azania	184	0.26	0	186	0.26	0	0
United Christian Democratic Party	120	0.17	0	188	0.26	0	0
All African Alliance Movement	147	0.20	0	103	0.14	0	0
United Democratic Movement	248	0.34	0				0
Labour Party of South Africa	109	0.15	0	111	0.15	0	0
United Africans Transformation	65	0.09	0	142	0.20	0	0
African People's Convention	84	0.12	0	73	0.10	0	0
All Citizens Party	39	0.05	0	68	0.09	0	0
Truth and Solidarity Movement	46	0.06	0	56	0.08	0	0
Al Jama-ah	37	0.05	0	35	0.05	0	0
Africa Restoration Alliance	23	0.03	0	32	0.04	0	0
Lekwe Bepe Kingdom Party	6	0.01	0	13	0.02	0	0
Total	72,129	100.00	35	72,071	100.00	34	69
Valid votes	72,129	98.09		72,071	98.20		
Invalid/blank votes	1,408	1.91		1,323	1.80		
Total votes	73,537	100.00		73,394	100.00		
Registered voters/turnout	142,004	51.79		142,004	51.68		
