= Westonaria Local Municipality =

Westonaria
- Local municipality
- Seal

- Location of Westonaria Local Municipality within Gauteng
- Coordinates: 26°20′S 27°40′E
- Country: South Africa
- Province: Gauteng
- District: West Rand
- Seat: Westonaria
- Wards: 16

Government
  - Type: Municipal council
  - Mayor: Nonkoliso Tundzi

Area
  - Total: 640 km^{2} (250 sq mi)

Population (2011)
  - Total: 111,767
  - Density: 170/km^{2} (450/sq mi)

Racial makeup (2011)
  - Black African: 91.4%
  - Coloured: 0.7%
  - Indian/Asian: 0.3%
  - White: 7.0%

First languages (2011)
  - Xhosa: 26.9%
  - Sotho: 18.8%
  - Tswana: 14.5%
  - Tsonga: 10.4%
  - Other: 29.4%
- Time zone: UTC+2 (SAST)
- Municipal code: GT483

Westonaria Local Municipality was a local municipality in West Rand District Municipality, Gauteng, South Africa. After municipal elections on 3 August 2016 it was merged with the Randfontein Local Municipality into the larger Rand West City Local Municipality.

== Background ==
The mining industry represents the largest employment sector in the municipality. The unemployment rate is approximately 30%. In 2007, 34% of households had access to piped water inside their homes, an improvement of 14 percentage points since 2001. Electricity is used for lighting, cooking, and heating in about 65% of households.

== Main places ==
The 2001 census divided the municipality into the following main places:

Place	Code	Area (km^{2})	Population	Most spoken language
Bekkersdal	70301	11.03	55,838	Xhosa
Cooke Mine	70302	2.73	1,215	Tsonga
Elsburg Gold Mine	70303	11.78	3,238	Tsonga
Etlebeni	70304	1.06	636	Xhosa
Glen Harvie	70305	3.96	4,757	Afrikaans
Hills Haven	70306	1.35	2,147	Afrikaans
Johannesburg	70307	3.58	315	Sotho
Kloof Gold Mine	70308	18.07	6,819	Sotho
Leeudoorn Mine	70309	8.86	2,610	Sotho
Libanon Gold Mine	70310	12.56	3,013	Xhosa
Modderfontein	70311	0.46	490	Sotho
Panvlak Gold Mine	70312	3.13	815	Xhosa
Randfontein Mine	70313	10.22	2,774	Tsonga
Venterspost	70314	40.19	1,048	Afrikaans
Waterpan	70315	1.57	433	Afrikaans
Westonaria	70317	6.46	8,441	Afrikaans
Remainder of the municipality	70316	478.90	14,731	Zulu

== Politics ==
The municipal council consists of thirty-one members elected by mixed-member proportional representation. Sixteen councillors are elected by first-past-the-post voting in sixteen wards, while the remaining fifteen are chosen from party lists so that the total number of party representatives is proportional to the number of votes received. In the election of 18 May 2011 the African National Congress (ANC) won a majority of twenty-three seats on the council. The following table shows the results of the election.

Party	Votes				Seats		
Party	Ward	List	Total	%	Ward	List	Total
ANC	17,903	18,138	36,041	74.4	15	8	23
DA	3,352	3,246	6,598	13.6	1	3	4
AZAPO	783	773	1,556	3.2	0	1	1
COPE	783	680	1,463	3.0	0	1	1
IFP	610	625	1,235	2.5	0	1	1
UDM	397	377	774	1.6	0	1	1
APC	159	155	314	0.6	0	0	0
VF+	87	114	201	0.4	0	0	0
Socialist Party of Azania	80	87	167	0.3	0	0	0
Independent	52	–	52	0.1	0	–	0
NFP	52	–	52	0.1	0	–	0
Total	24,258	24,195	48,453	100.0	16	15	31
Spoilt votes	588	407	995				
