= Munsieville =

- Location within Gauteng Location within South Africa
- Coordinates: 26.075°S 27.753°E
- Country: South Africa
- Province: Gauteng
- District: West Rand
- Municipality: Mogale City

Area
  - Total: 1.55 km^{2} (0.60 sq mi)

Population (2011)
  - Total: 19,128
  - Density: 12,300/km^{2} (32,000/sq mi)

Racial makeup (2011)
  - Black African: 98.9%
  - Coloured: 0.6%
  - Indian/Asian: 0.2%
  - White: 0.1%
  - Other: 0.2%

First languages (2011)
  - Tswana: 67.2%
  - Zulu: 6.7%
  - Xhosa: 6.5%
  - Sotho: 5.3%
  - Other: 14.3%
- Time zone: UTC+2 (SAST)
- Postal code (street): 1739
- PO box: 1775

Munsieville is a township situated in the Krugersdorp area in Gauteng Province, South Africa. It grew out of the informal settlements inhabited by mine laborers on the outskirts of the original mining town of Krugersdorp.

The township was established by ordinance 58 of 1903 of the Krugersdorp municipality and called "the native location". From the early 1930s to the 1940s, Mr. James Munsie, the white chief sanitary inspector (medical officer) of Krugersdorp, moved the location from a low drainage area to its current location, improving conditions.

== History ==
The story of Munsieville began on 15 December 1905, when it was gazetted that the piece of land to the north-west of Krugersdorp near District Township was to be used as a 'native location'. It was, however, only in 1911 that the New Donation (as it was then called) was officially established by the Municipal Council, and all blacks not living on their employers' premises had to be resident there.

In 1913, a housing plan was formulated, based on one already in existence in Benoni. It made provision for two and three bed-roomed houses costing about 20 pounds a room to build, and an 18-room compound. By 1923, about 220 males, 262 females and 325 children were living in 119 houses on the location.

In 1934, standpipes (taps at the corners of the street from which residents could draw their water) and central wash houses were in use in the area. One year later it was necessary to extend the New Location. The Old Location, which was near the present-day Burgershoop, was disestablished in 1937. After that, a new sub-economic housing scheme including: sewage, guttering, curbing and 3 and 4 roomed houses was begun to accommodate overcrowding.

At a monthly council meeting in 1941, it was unanimously agreed to change the township's name to Munsieville, after the chief sanitary inspector at the time, James Munsie. He is remembered for the tremendous amount he did in the interest of the town's health.

Years later, the current township of Munsieville was demarcated and formal township housing was erected.

In the 1980s Munsieville was threatened with destruction and the removal of its residents to Kagiso because of its proximity to the white suburbs of Krugersdorp. Munisiville was one of only two black townships that resisted relocation in the Transvaal during that period.

== Culture ==
Munsieville has always had a vibrant social culture and was on the forefront of political activism during the struggle against apartheid. Today, residents enjoy better facilities and modern services. [According to the Krugersdorp Herald and residents the modern facilities consist of one mobile toilet for two households and six water taps.]

One of the traditions which remain is the culture of children playing in the streets. This was a result of the lack of sporting or recreational facilities. Apart from the ever-popular soccer games, one can also view children's traditional African games.

Talented local women have formed the Mukondeleli Craft Suppliers. Their bead-work, clay pots and quilting are on display here.

== People from Munsieville ==
Munsieville is the childhood home of Archbishop Desmond Tutu. Archbishop Emeritus and Nobel Peace Prize recipient Desmond Mpilo Tutu lived in Munsieville from an early age. His father was headmaster of St Paul's Anglican Mission School where young Mpilo began his education. Tutu was later a schoolteacher at Munsieville School before he joined the priesthood.

Tutu and his wife Leah married in a Roman Catholic Church in Munsieville. He recalls: "That church was razed to the ground along with many residential buildings because Munsieville was doomed to be demolished. It was an aberration; a black spot in what should have been a lily-white area. Munsieville was reprieved only by the intervention of Leon Wessels, the Nationalist MP for Krugersdorp, who later apologised handsomely for apartheid. He was to become Deputy Chair of the Constituent Assembly that gave us our wonderful Constitution."

Tutu's childhood home can be visited, as can other 'exile' houses.
