= West Rand =

Western region of Gauteng, South Africa

A map of Gauteng, showing the West Rand District Municipality.

The West Rand is the urban western part of the Witwatersrand that is functionally merged with the Johannesburg conurbation. This area became settled by Europeans after a gold-bearing reef discovered in 1886 and sparked the gold rush that gave rise to the establishment of Johannesburg.

The West Rand extends from Randfontein in the west to Roodepoort in the east, and includes the town of Krugersdorp. The areas of Carletonville and Westonaria are sometimes included as being part of the Far West Rand. The areas are economically linked to the city through the gold mining industry. Following the creation of the Johannesburg unicity in 1999, Roodepoort, which is traditionally regarded as part of the West Rand, became part of Johannesburg municipality. After 1999, much of the area became part of the newly formed West Rand District Municipality (excluding Roodepoort, which became part of the City of Johannesburg Metropolitan Municipality).

Despite being a separate municipal area, like the East Rand, the West Rand is included in the Witwatersrand urban area. To this end, the West Rand shares the same dialling code as Johannesburg (011 locally) and the same metropolitan route numbering system as Johannesburg (and the East Rand). It is common for residents of the West Rand to work in Johannesburg proper and vice versa.
