= Lesedi Local Municipality elections =

Local elections in Gauteng, South Africa

The Lesedi Local Municipality council consists of twenty-six members elected by mixed-member proportional representation. Thirteen councillors are elected by first-past-the-post voting in thirteen wards, while the remaining thirteen are chosen from party lists so that the total number of party representatives is proportional to the number of votes received.

In the election of 4 November 2026 the African National Congress (ANC) won a plurality of seats on the council.

The planned abolition of the Lesedi, and its absorption into Ekurhuleni after the 2016 municipal elections, was blocked by the High Court of South Africa in 2015.

== Results ==
The following table shows the composition of the council after past elections.

Event	ANC	DA	EFF	FF+	Other	Total
2000 election	15	5	—	1	0	21
2006 election	15	4	—	1	1	21
2011 election	19	6	—	1	0	26
2016 election	16	6	3	1	0	26
2021 election	13	5	4	3	1	26
2026 election	9	7	2	2	6	26

== December 2000 election ==
The following table shows the results of the 2000 election.

Party	Ward			List			Total seats
Party	Votes	%	Seats	Votes	%	Seats	Total seats
African National Congress	7,651	60.09	8	12,597	70.34	7	15
Democratic Alliance	4,373	34.34	3	4,582	25.58	2	5
Freedom Front Plus	561	4.41	0	461	2.57	1	1
Inkatha Freedom Party	148	1.16	0	270	1.51	0	0
Total	12,733	100.00	11	17,910	100.00	10	21
Valid votes	12,733	97.51		17,910	97.83		
Invalid/blank votes	325	2.49		398	2.17		
Total votes	13,058	100.00		18,308	100.00		
Registered voters/turnout	34,296	38.07		34,296	53.38		

== March 2006 election ==
The following table shows the results of the 2006 election.

Party	Ward			List			Total seats
Party	Votes	%	Seats	Votes	%	Seats	Total seats
African National Congress	13,998	70.49	9	13,915	70.27	6	15
Democratic Alliance	4,063	20.46	2	4,083	20.62	2	4
Freedom Front Plus	932	4.69	0	884	4.46	1	1
Independent Democrats	738	3.72	0	675	3.41	1	1
Inkatha Freedom Party	53	0.27	0	138	0.70	0	0
Economic Freedom Movement	73	0.37	0	106	0.54	0	0
Total	19,857	100.00	11	19,801	100.00	10	21
Valid votes	19,857	98.34		19,801	98.10		
Invalid/blank votes	335	1.66		383	1.90		
Total votes	20,192	100.00		20,184	100.00		
Registered voters/turnout	39,521	51.09		39,521	51.07		

== May 2011 election ==
The following table shows the results of the 2011 election.

Party	Ward			List			Total seats
Party	Votes	%	Seats	Votes	%	Seats	Total seats
African National Congress	19,080	70.37	10	19,444	71.22	9	19
Democratic Alliance	6,654	24.54	3	6,613	24.22	3	6
Freedom Front Plus	719	2.65	0	575	2.11	1	1
Congress of the People	256	0.94	0	264	0.97	0	0
Pan Africanist Congress of Azania	225	0.83	0	208	0.76	0	0
National Freedom Party	158	0.58	0	105	0.38	0	0
Inkatha Freedom Party	20	0.07	0	93	0.34	0	0
Total	27,112	100.00	13	27,302	100.00	13	26
Valid votes	27,112	98.24		27,302	98.65		
Invalid/blank votes	487	1.76		373	1.35		
Total votes	27,599	100.00		27,675	100.00		
Registered voters/turnout	44,483	62.04		44,483	62.21		

== August 2016 election ==
The following table shows the results of the 2016 election.

Party	Ward			List			Total seats
Party	Votes	%	Seats	Votes	%	Seats	Total seats
African National Congress	18,829	61.94	10	18,888	62.23	6	16
Democratic Alliance	7,207	23.71	3	7,235	23.84	3	6
Economic Freedom Fighters	3,070	10.10	0	3,005	9.90	3	3
Freedom Front Plus	1,041	3.42	0	1,058	3.49	1	1
Inkatha Freedom Party	118	0.39	0	167	0.55	0	0
Independent candidates	133	0.44	0				0
Total	30,398	100.00	13	30,353	100.00	13	26
Valid votes	30,398	98.81		30,353	98.79		
Invalid/blank votes	367	1.19		373	1.21		
Total votes	30,765	100.00		30,726	100.00		
Registered voters/turnout	48,336	63.65		48,336	63.57		

== November 2021 election ==
The ANC lost its majority for the first time, winning a plurality of thirteen. The following table shows the results of the 2021 election.

Party	Ward			List			Total seats
Party	Votes	%	Seats	Votes	%	Seats	Total seats
African National Congress	12,140	50.40	10	12,175	50.47	3	13
Democratic Alliance	4,893	20.31	3	4,905	20.33	2	5
Economic Freedom Fighters	3,258	13.53	0	3,266	13.54	4	4
Freedom Front Plus	2,227	9.25	0	2,129	8.83	3	3
Socialist Economic Freedom Movement	580	2.41	0	504	2.09	1	1
African Christian Democratic Party	316	1.31	0	331	1.37	0	0
Black First Land First	258	1.07	0	296	1.23	0	0
Inkatha Freedom Party	118	0.49	0	172	0.71	0	0
South African Royal Kingdoms Organization	131	0.54	0	125	0.52	0	0
African Transformation Movement	50	0.21	0	117	0.48	0	0
Congress of the People	77	0.32	0	70	0.29	0	0
Community Solidarity Association	14	0.06	0	20	0.08	0	0
New Horizon Movement	7	0.03	0	14	0.06	0	0
Independent candidates	18	0.07	0				0
Total	24,087	100.00	13	24,124	100.00	13	26
Valid votes	24,087	98.58		24,124	98.53		
Invalid/blank votes	346	1.42		360	1.47		
Total votes	24,433	100.00		24,484	100.00		
Registered voters/turnout	47,853	51.06		47,853	51.17		

=== By-elections from November 2021 ===
The following by-elections were held to fill vacant ward seats in the period since the election in November 2021.

Date	Ward	Party of the previous councillor	Party of the newly elected councillor
24 May 2023	8	Democratic Alliance	Democratic Alliance

== November 2026 election ==
The following table shows the result of the election.

Party	Ward			List			Total seats
Party	Votes	%	Seats	Votes	%	Seats	Total seats
Democratic Alliance	9,544	29.64	4	9,541	29.47	3	7
African National Congress	9,504	29.52	9	9,307	28.74	0	9
uMkhonto weSizwe Party	4,111	12.77	0	4,645	14.35	3	3
Economic Freedom Fighters	2,430	7.55	0	2,262	6.99	2	2
Freedom Front Plus	2,029	6.30	0	2,076	6.41	2	2
ActionSA	1,143	3.55	0	1,191	3.68	1	1
South African Communist Party	1,100	3.42	0	1,086	3.35	1	1
Bopa Sechaba Community Movement	357	1.11	0	360	1.11	1	1
United Africans Transformation	318	0.99	0	361	1.11	0	0
African Independent Congress	261	0.81	0	166	0.51	0	0
African Transformation Movement	202	0.63	0	203	0.63	0	0
Inkatha Freedom Party	182	0.57	0	184	0.57	0	0
Socialist Economic Freedom Movement	185	0.57	0	174	0.54	0	0
Pan Africanist Congress of Azania	165	0.51	0	120	0.37	0	0
African Christian Democratic Party	120	0.37	0	113	0.35	0	0
Patriotic Alliance	113	0.35	0	111	0.34	0	0
Service Delivery Party	89	0.28	0	72	0.22	0	0
Community Service Alliance	95	0.30	0	52	0.16	0	0
African Economic Freedom	16	0.05	0	116	0.36	0	0
Build One South Africa	59	0.18	0	64	0.20	0	0
Afrika Mayibuye Movement	62	0.19	0	44	0.14	0	0
Active Citizens of South Africa	35	0.11	0	23	0.07	0	0
National Freedom Party	4	0.01	0	50	0.15	0	0
Economic Liberators Forum South Africa	26	0.08	0	22	0.07	0	0
Vaal Party	21	0.07	0	19	0.06	0	0
All Citizens Party	4	0.01	0	12	0.04	0	0
Know Your Power	10	0.03	0	6	0.02	0	0
Civic Movement for Progressive Citizens	12	0.04	0				0
Total	32,197	100.00	13	32,380	100.00	13	26
Valid votes	32,197	98.59		32,380	98.86		
Invalid/blank votes	462	1.41		375	1.14		
Total votes	32,659	100.00		32,755	100.00		
Registered voters/turnout	55,720	58.61		55,720	58.78		
