= Venterspos =

- Location within Gauteng Location within South Africa
- Coordinates: 26.266°S 27.633°E
- Country: South Africa
- Province: Gauteng
- District: West Rand
- Municipality: Rand West City

Area
  - Total: 40.21 km^{2} (15.53 sq mi)

Population (2011)
  - Total: 1,272
  - Density: 31.63/km^{2} (81.93/sq mi)

Racial makeup (2011)
  - Black African: 35.1%
  - Coloured: 1.3%
  - White: 63.7%

First languages (2011)
  - Afrikaans: 53.0%
  - English: 12.7%
  - Tswana: 11.0%
  - Xhosa: 6.4%
  - Other: 16.9%
- Time zone: UTC+2 (SAST)
- Postal code (street): 1782
- PO box: 1779

Venterspos is a town in West Rand District Municipality in the Gauteng province of South Africa. It was proclaimed in 1937.
