= Rietvallei, Gauteng =

Rietvallei
- Location within Gauteng Location within South Africa
- Coordinates: 26.188°S 27.759°E
- Country: South Africa
- Province: Gauteng
- District: West Rand
- Municipality: Mogale City

Area
  - Total: 17.19 km^{2} (6.64 sq mi)

Population (2011)
  - Total: 49,552
  - Density: 2,883/km^{2} (7,466/sq mi)

Racial makeup (2011)
  - Black African: 99.0%
  - Coloured: 0.3%
  - Indian/Asian: 0.1%
  - White: 0.1%
  - Other: 0.5%

First languages (2011)
  - Tswana: 24.7%
  - Zulu: 22.3%
  - Xhosa: 18.9%
  - Tsonga: 11.8%
  - Other: 22.3%
- Time zone: UTC+2 (SAST)

Rietvallei is a township west of Johannesburg, South Africa.

It is located at the southern end of the Mogale City Local Municipality in the West Rand District Municipality, just south-west of Kagiso.
