= Bekkersdal =

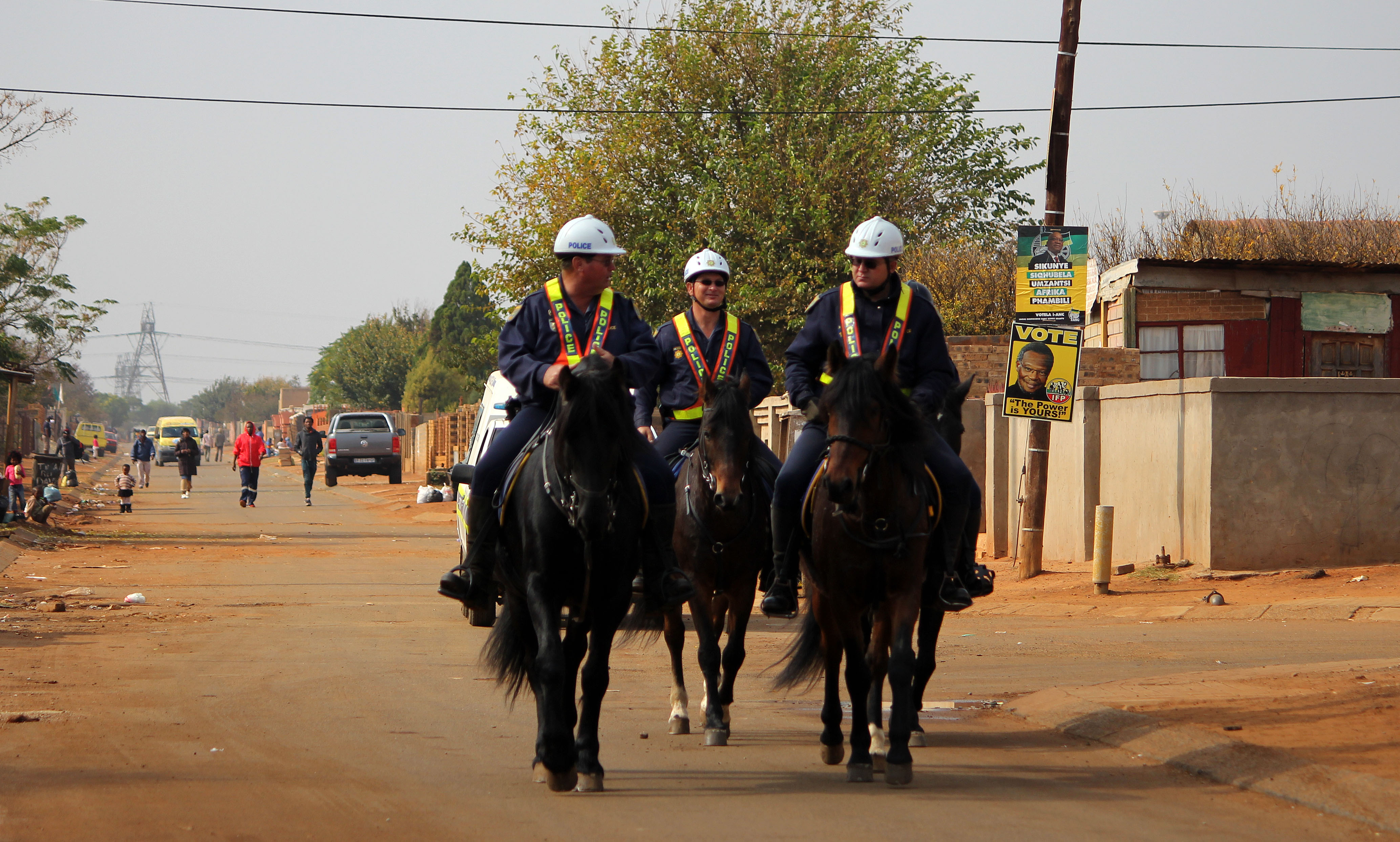
- Mounted police in Bekkersdal, ahead of the 2014 election

- Location within Gauteng Location within South Africa
- Coordinates: 26°16′S 27°42′E
- Country: South Africa
- Province: Gauteng
- District: West Rand
- Municipality: Rand West City

Area
  - Total: 27.90 km^{2} (10.77 sq mi)

Population (2011)
  - Total: 47,213
  - Density: 1,692/km^{2} (4,383/sq mi)

Racial makeup (2011)
  - Black African: 98.2%
  - Coloured: 0.4%
  - Indian/Asian: 0.2%
  - White: 0.1%
  - Other: 1.1%

First languages (2011)
  - Xhosa: 30.5%
  - Sotho: 19.3%
  - Tswana: 16.0%
  - Tsonga: 13.9%
  - Other: 20.3%
- Time zone: UTC+2 (SAST)
- Postal code (street): 1779
- PO box: 1772

Bekkersdal is a township situated 7 km east of Westonaria and 14 km south of Randfontein in the Gauteng province. It was established in 1945, to house Africans who worked in town and at the surrounding gold mines. In 1983 the township was granted municipal status. The township was the site of violent protests ahead of the general elections on 7 May 2014. In September 27, 2026, seventeen people were killed and 15 more were injured in a mass shooting carried out by eight gunmen at the KwaNoxolo tavern with Police launching a manhunt for the gunmen.
