= 2016 South African municipal elections =

South African municipal elections held on 3 August 2016

- 3 August 2016

All councillors for all 8 metropolitan municipalities All councillors for all 226 local municipalities 40% of councillors for all 44 district municipalities
- Turnout: 57.94% (▲0.34pp)
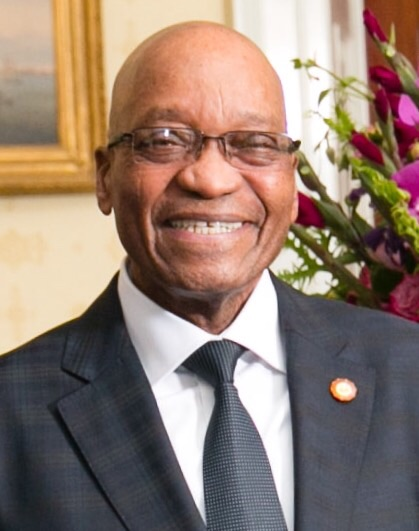

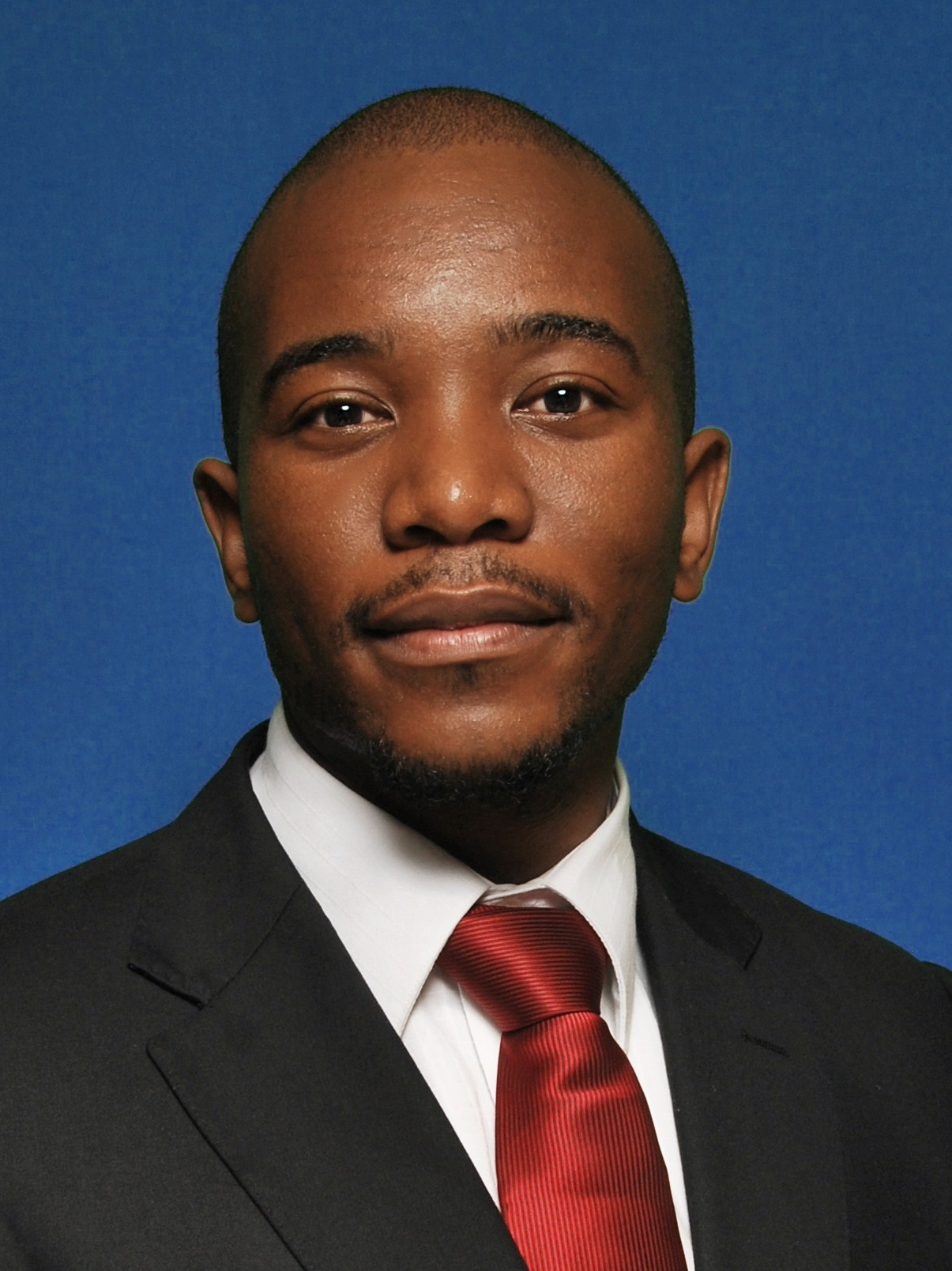

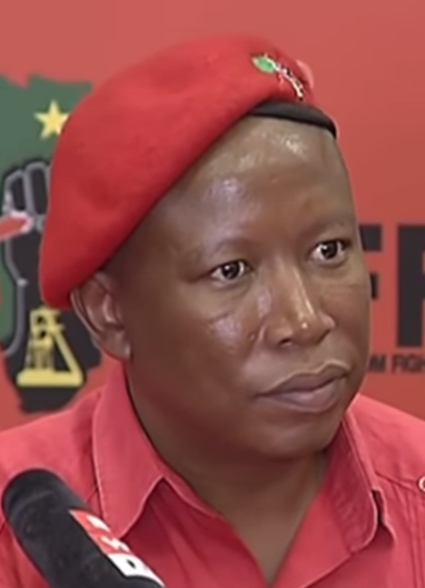

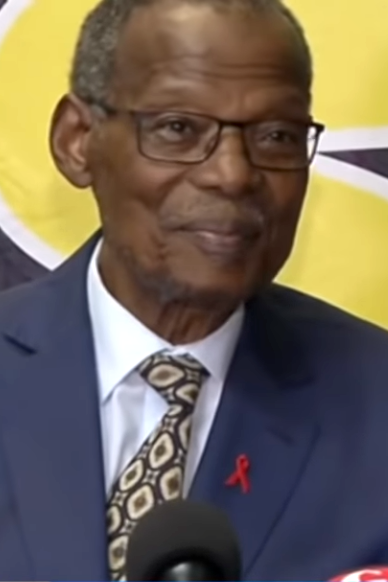
| | First party | Second party | Third party |
|---|---|---|---|
| Leader | Jacob Zuma | Mmusi Maimane | Julius Malema |
| Party | ANC | Democratic Alliance | EFF |
| Popular vote | 53.91% | 27.39% | 8.19% |
| Swing | ▼8.04% | ▲2.96% | New |
| Councillors | 5,163 | 1,782 | 761 |
| Councillors ± | ▼468 | ▲227 | ▲761 |
| Municipalities | 167 | 33 | 0 |
| Municipalities ± | ▼15 | ▲12 | Steady |
| | Fourth party |
| Leader | Mangosuthu Buthelezi |
| Party | IFP |
| Popular vote | 4.25% |
| Swing | ▲0.68% |
| Councillors | 432 |
| Councillors ± | ▲80 |
| Municipalities | 11 |
| Municipalities ± | ▲9 |

The 2016 South African municipal elections were held on 3 August 2016, to elect councils for all district, metropolitan and local municipalities in each of the country's nine provinces. It was the fifth municipal election held in South Africa since the end of apartheid in 1994; municipal elections are held every five years.

The ruling African National Congress (ANC) was the largest party overall, earning 53.9% of the total vote. (Note: Ward + PR total, the figure used by most publications when reporting on the results. This figure provides the most accurate representation of the election outcome, as district municipality results (which favour rural areas) are not taken into account) It was followed by the official opposition Democratic Alliance (DA) with 26.9% and the Economic Freedom Fighters (EFF) with 8.2%. Popular support for the ANC fell to its lowest level since 1994, a shift which was most pronounced in the country's urban centres. Despite marginal gains in some areas, the ANC lost control of three metropolitan municipalities – namely Nelson Mandela Bay, City of Tshwane and City of Johannesburg – to opposition parties as a result of the election. The DA achieved its best local electoral performance so far, while the EFF, contesting its first local government election, improved on its performance in the 2014 general election. The local polls were widely seen a turning point in the political landscape of South Africa, as the dominance of the ANC was greatly diminished while coalition and minority governments became more widespread.

== Electoral system ==
Local government in South Africa consists of municipalities of various types. The largest metropolitan areas are governed by metropolitan municipalities, while the rest of the country is divided into district municipalities, each of which consists of several local municipalities. After the 2016 election there were eight metropolitan municipalities, 44 district municipalities and 205 local municipalities.

District and metropolitan (red) municipalities

Local municipalities

The councils of metropolitan and local municipalities are elected by a system of mixed-member proportional representation, in which half of the seats in each municipality are elected on the first-past-the-post system in single-member wards and the other half of the seats are allocated according to the proportional representation (PR) system. The latter takes into account the number of ward seats won by a party, and ensures that the final number of seats held by that party is proportional to their percentage of the total vote. District municipality councils are partly elected by proportional representation and partly appointed by the councils of the constituent local municipalities. Voters in both metropolitan and local municipalities elect a single ward candidate as well as a proportional representative in their municipal council. Residents of municipalities that form part of district councils (that is, excluding metropolitan municipalities) also cast a third vote to elect a proportional representative for their district council in addition to the two votes they cast for their local council.

== Political parties ==
The ruling African National Congress (ANC) has been the majority party in most municipalities across South Africa, with the exception of those in the Western Cape, since 1994. Its overall share of the vote decreased slightly from 65.7% in 2006 to 62.93% in 2011 amid growing discontent regarding the state of the country's economy and perceived corruption within the organisation since the end of apartheid. The party was led by Jacob Zuma, who was replaced by Cyril Ramaphosa at the 57th National Conference in December 2017.

The official opposition Democratic Alliance (DA) increased its total share of the vote from 16.3% in 2006 to 24.1% in 2011, while assuming control of most Western Cape councils. The party contested an election for the first time under the leadership of Mmusi Maimane, who succeeded Helen Zille as leader in May 2015.

The newly formed Economic Freedom Fighters (EFF), led by expelled ANC Youth League leader Julius Malema, contested its first municipal election since its formation in 2013. Smaller parties included the Inkatha Freedom Party (IFP), which held several municipalities in its stronghold KwaZulu-Natal, and the Congress of the People (COPE), which was expected to decrease its share of the vote after the decline in support following the 2014 general election. The National Freedom Party (NFP), a breakaway from the IFP led by former IFP chairperson Zanele kaMagwaza-Msibi, was barred from participating in the election after it failed to pay its registration fee to the Independent Electoral Commission. The party had support in areas where the IFP had been strong, and prior to the election governed a number of municipalities in KwaZulu-Natal in coalition with the African National Congress. The NFP was, however, allowed to contest the election in one municipality, Nquthu, where its local branch had paid the registration fee on time. The party obtained just two seats in this council, down from five seats in 2011.

== Campaigning ==
The country's ruling party, the ANC, was reported to have spent R1 billion (US$71 million) in campaigning in the election. The Democratic Alliance (DA) was reported to have spent R350 million and the Inkatha Freedom Party (IFP) spent between R15 million and R20 million. The United Democratic Movement (UDM) reportedly spent under R4 million contesting the election.

The top three issues of the election were the constantly high unemployment rate, corruption and poor service delivery by government. A major campaign issue during the election was corruption within the ANC, in particular President Jacob Zuma's relationship with the Gupta family and funding for the construction of his homestead at Nkandla.

The ANC was accused by commentators and the DA of trying to make racism a key electoral issue by racialising the election.

The run-up to the election was marked by a number of murders of ANC candidates allegedly by rivals within the ANC in an effort to secure lucrative positions in local government. Inter ANC rivalries also sparked protests from 20 to 22 June 2016 in the City of Tshwane over the ANC's selection of Thoko Didiza as mayoral candidate for the city that left 5 people dead.

In January 2017 the ANC was taken to court by a South African public relations expert (Sihle Bolani) for work done during the elections, Bolani stated that the ANC used her to launch and run a covert R50 million fake news and disinformation campaign aimed at discrediting opposition parties during the election.

In his book How to Steal a City (2017), author Crispian Olver states that corruption and state capture within the ANC governed Nelson Mandela Bay Metropolitan Municipality led to the party losing the city to the DA in the 2016 elections.

== Municipal demarcation changes ==
South Africa's Municipal Demarcation Board announced changed ward demarcations and municipal boundaries, following former Cooperative Governance and Traditional Affairs Minister Pravin Gordhan suggesting the redrawing of boundaries to make municipalities more sustainable and financially viable. There are 34 cases that affect 90 municipalities. The DA objected, and MP James Selfe has announced that the DA would take the Board to court over what it says is clear party-motivated and irrational boundary determinations.

== Target municipalities ==
The two major political parties announced that they were specifically targeting certain municipalities for the 2016 election. The African National Congress (ANC) claimed that, in addition to maintaining control of certain municipalities, it would also take control of the City of Cape Town. The Democratic Alliance announced a "big five" plan to target specific municipalities: three metropolitan; Tshwane, Johannesburg, Nelson Mandela Bay, and Tlokwe Local Municipality for takeover, and an increased majority in Cape Town.

=== Nelson Mandela Bay ===
Danny Jordaan was appointed Mayor of Nelson Mandela Bay in 2015 and also ran for the ANC in the 2016 election. On April 13, 2015, the Democratic Alliance selected former DA Parliamentary Leader Athol Trollip as its mayoral candidate.

=== Johannesburg ===
Incumbent Mayor Parks Tau represented the African National Congress in the election as its mayoral candidate, despite some ANC members having suggested Geoff Makhubo as a potential alternative. The Democratic Alliance selected businessman Herman Mashaba over Wits professor and DA councillor Rabelani Dagada as its mayoral candidate on January 16, 2016. The EFF did not announce a mayoral candidate, but deployed Floyd Shivambu to build EFF election machinery in Johannesburg for the upcoming election.

=== Tshwane ===
The incumbent mayor of Tshwane was Kgosientso Ramokgopa of the African National Congress. On 20 June 2016 riots broke out in Tshwane over the ANC's selection of Thoko Didiza as mayoral candidate for Tshwane. On 5 September 2015 the Democratic Alliance selected MPL Solly Msimanga over 2011 mayoral candidate Brandon Topham and councillor Bronwyn Engelbrecht.

=== Cape Town ===
Incumbent DA Mayor Patricia de Lille was renominated in January 2016 as her party's mayoral candidate.

== Election results ==
The ruling African National Congress (ANC) remained the largest party, obtaining 53.91% of the votes nationally, a fall from the 62.93% achieved in 2011. The Democratic Alliance (DA) remained the second largest at 26.90%, up from 24.1% in 2011. The Economic Freedom Fighters obtained 8.19% in their first municipal election.

The decline in ANC support was most significant in urban areas, with the ANC losing its outright majority in 4 of the country's 8 metropolitan municipalities for the first time since 1994. The ANC retained Buffalo City, Mangaung and eThekwini, but with decreased majorities in Buffalo City and eThekwini. In the City of Johannesburg and Ekurhuleni, the ANC lost its majority but retained a plurality. The DA increased its majority in the City of Cape Town, and achieved pluralities in Tshwane and Nelson Mandela Bay, its first in metropolitan municipalities outside of the Western Cape. Of the 4 hung metropolitan municipalities, the ANC retained Ekurhuleni through a coalition, while the DA gained control of Nelson Mandela Bay through a coalition, and formed minority governments in Johannesburg and Tshwane.

=== National results by party ===
| Party | Ward | | PR | | Ward + PR | | DC | | Total | |
| Party | Votes | % | Votes | % | Votes | % | Votes | % | Votes | % |
|---|---|---|---|---|---|---|---|---|---|---|
| ANC | 7,978,983 | 53.34% | 8,124,223 | 54.49% | 16,103,206 | 53.91% | 5,347,126 | 61.68% | 21,450,332 | 55.65% |
| DA | 4,004,865 | 26.77% | 4,028,765 | 27.02% | 8,033,630 | 26.90% | 1,429,868 | 16.52% | 9,463,498 | 24.57% |
| EFF | 1,217,805 | 8.14% | 1,229,548 | 8.25% | 2,447,353 | 8.19% | 755,326 | 8.73% | 3,202,679 | 8.31% |
| IFP | 632,102 | 4.23% | 636,722 | 4.27% | 1,268,824 | 4.25% | 554,558 | 6.41% | 1,823,382 | 4.73% |
| AIC | 88,501 | 0.59% | 145,759 | 0.98% | 234,260 | 0.78% | 99,395 | 1.15% | 333,655 | 0.87% |
| VF+ | 115,993 | 0.78% | 113,288 | 0.76% | 229,281 | 0.77% | 78,268 | 0.90% | 307,549 | 0.80% |
| UDM | 76,351 | 0.51% | 91,271 | 0.61% | 167,622 | 0.56% | 70,378 | 0.81% | 238,000 | 0.62% |
| COPE | 62,582 | 0.42% | 67,779 | 0.45% | 130,361 | 0.44% | 55,824 | 0.65% | 186,185 | 0.48% |
| ACDP | 61,966 | 0.41% | 62,463 | 0.42% | 124,429 | 0.42% | 26,536 | 0.31% | 150,965 | 0.39% |
| F4SD | 28,638 | 0.19% | 28,849 | 0.19% | 57,487 | 0.19% | 29,180 | 0.34% | 86,667 | 0.23% |
| APC | 24,819 | 0.17% | 40,758 | 0.27% | 65,577 | 0.22% | 19,002 | 0.22% | 84,579 | 0.22% |
| PAC | 28,171 | 0.19% | 29,807 | 0.20% | 57,978 | 0.19% | 16,629 | 0.19% | 74,607 | 0.19% |
| Bushbuckridge Residents Association | 24,592 | 0.16% | 24,889 | 0.17% | 49,481 | 0.17% | 23,987 | 0.28% | 73,468 | 0.19% |
| Independent Civic Organisation | 15,240 | 0.10% | 15,239 | 0.10% | 30,479 | 0.10% | 13,762 | 0.16% | 44,241 | 0.11% |
| Al Jama-ah | 19,030 | 0.13% | 17,223 | 0.12% | 36,243 | 0.12% | 648 | 0.01% | 36,891 | 0.10% |
| UCDP | 7,975 | 0.05% | 9,695 | 0.07% | 17,670 | 0.06% | 10,571 | 0.12% | 28,241 | 0.07% |
| AZAPO | 9,801 | 0.07% | 10,126 | 0.07% | 19,927 | 0.07% | 8,122 | 0.09% | 28,049 | 0.07% |
| Independent | 341,030 | 2.28% | N/A | | 341,030 | 1.14% | N/A | | 341,030 | 0.89% |
| Total | 14,959,033 | | 14,910,817 | | 29,869,850 | | 8,654,209 | | 38,524,059 | |

- PR = Proportional Representation
- DC = District Council

=== Results by Municipal Type ===
Nature of the governments formed in the metropolitan and local municipalities: ANC majority; DA majority; IFP majority; ANC coalition or minority; DA coalition or minority; IFP coalition or minority

The statistics in this section are all sourced from the Independent Electoral Commission's official website unless specified otherwise.

Metropolitan Municipalities

| Party | Type of Control | Municipalities | Change |
|---|---|---|---|
| African National Congress | ANC Majority | 3 | ▼4 |
| African National Congress | ANC Coalition | 1 | ▲1 |
| African National Congress | Total | 4 | ▼3 |
| Democratic Alliance | DA Majority | 1 | 0 |
| Democratic Alliance | DA Coalition | 1 | ▲1 |
| Democratic Alliance | DA Minority | 2 | ▲2 |
| Democratic Alliance | Total | 4 | ▲3 |

District Municipalities

Local Municipalities

| Party | Type of Control | Municipalities | Change |
|---|---|---|---|
| African National Congress | ANC Majority | 158 | ▲5 1/6 (Note: Not a whole number due to merged municipalities) |
| African National Congress | ANC Coalition | 3 | ▼18 1/2 (Note: Not a whole number due to merged municipalities) |
| African National Congress | ANC Minority | 2 | ▲1 |
| African National Congress | Total | 163 | ▼13 2/3 |
| Democratic Alliance | DA Majority | 17 | ▲5 2/3 (Note: Not a whole number due to merged municipalities) |
| Democratic Alliance | DA Coalition | 8 | ▼2 |
| Democratic Alliance | DA Minority | 4 | ▲4 |
| Democratic Alliance | Total | 29 | ▲7 2/3 |
| Inkatha Freedom Party | IFP Majority | 6 | ▲4 |
| Inkatha Freedom Party | IFP Minority | 5 | ▲5 |
| Inkatha Freedom Party | Total | 11 | ▲9 |
| COPE | COPE Coalition | 0 | ▼1 |
| COPE | Total | 0 | ▼1 |
| ICOSA | ICOSA Coalition | 0 | ▼1 |
| ICOSA | Total | 0 | ▼1 |
| National Freedom Party | NFP Majority | 0 | ▼1 |
| National Freedom Party | NFP Coalition | 0 | ▼1 |
| National Freedom Party | Total | 0 | ▼2 |

=== Seats won by province ===
Seat allocations in local and metropolitan councils, sorted by province.

==== Eastern Cape ====
In the following table, green rows indicate those won by the ANC with a majority, blue rows indicate municipalities won by the DA with a majority, and light blue rows indicate a DA coalition or minority, light green cells indicate municipalities won by the ANC with Minorities or Coalitions.

Metropolitan Municipalities
| Municipality | | ANC | DA | EFF | Others | Total | Prior Control | New Control |
|---|---|---|---|---|---|---|---|---|
| Buffalo City | | 60 | 24 | 8 | 8 | 100 | ANC majority | ANC majority |
| Nelson Mandela Bay | | 50 | 57 | 6 | 7 | 120 | ANC majority | DA-UDM-Cope-ACDP Coalition |
Two Tier Municipalities
| District Municipality | Local Municipality | ANC | DA | EFF | Others | Total | Prior Control | New Control |
| Sarah Baartman | | | | | | | ANC majority | ANC majority |
| | Dr Beyers Naudé | 14 | 13 | 0 | 0 | 27 | New municipality (Note: This municipality was formed by the merger of three smaller municipalities, two had ANC majorities and one a DA majority) | ANC majority |
| | Blue Crane Route | 7 | 4 | 0 | 0 | 11 | ANC majority | ANC majority |
| | Makana | 17 | 8 | 2 | 0 | 27 | ANC majority | ANC majority |
| | Ndlambe | 13 | 6 | 1 | 0 | 20 | ANC majority | ANC majority |
| | Sundays River Valley | 11 | 4 | 1 | 0 | 16 | ANC majority | ANC majority |
| | Kouga | 12 | 17 | 0 | 0 | 29 | ANC majority | DA majority |
| | Kou-Kamma | 6 | 5 | 0 | 0 | 11 | ANC majority | ANC majority |
| Amathole | | | | | | | ANC majority | ANC majority |
| | Mbhashe | 47 | 2 | 2 | 12 | 63 | ANC majority | ANC majority |
| | Mnquma | 48 | 3 | 3 | 8 | 62 | ANC majority | ANC majority |
| | Great Kei | 9 | 2 | 1 | 1 | 13 | ANC majority | ANC majority |
| | Amahlathi | 24 | 3 | 3 | 0 | 30 | ANC majority | ANC majority |
| | Ngqushwa | 20 | 2 | 1 | 0 | 23 | ANC majority | ANC majority |
| | Raymond Mhlaba | 38 | 5 | 3 | 0 | 46 | ANC majority (Note: This municipality was formed by the merger of two smaller municipalities, both of which had ANC majorities.) | ANC majority |
| Chris Hani | | | | | | | ANC majority | ANC majority |
| | Inxuba Yethemba | 11 | 7 | 0 | 0 | 18 | ANC majority | ANC majority |
| | Intsika Yethu | 35 | 1 | 3 | 3 | 42 | ANC majority | ANC majority |
| | Emalahleni | 28 | 4 | 1 | 1 | 34 | ANC majority | ANC majority |
| | Engcobo | 33 | 1 | 2 | 3 | 39 | ANC majority | ANC majority |
| | Sakhisizwe | 14 | 1 | 1 | 1 | 17 | ANC majority | ANC majority |
| | Enoch Mgijima | 50 | 9 | 6 | 3 | 68 | ANC majority (Note: This municipality was formed by the merger of three smaller municipalities, all of which had ANC majorities.) | ANC majority |
| Joe Gqabi | | | | | | | ANC majority | ANC majority |
| | Elundini | 28 | 2 | 1 | 3 | 34 | ANC majority | ANC majority |
| | Senqu | 23 | 2 | 1 | 8 | 34 | ANC majority | ANC majority |
| | Walter Sisulu | 15 | 5 | 1 | 1 | 22 | ANC majority (Note: This municipality was formed by the merger of two smaller municipalities, both of which had ANC majorities.) | ANC majority |
| OR Tambo | | | | | | | ANC majority | ANC majority |
| | Ngquza Hill | 53 | 2 | 4 | 4 | 63 | ANC majority | ANC majority |
| | Port St Johns | 31 | 2 | 1 | 5 | 39 | ANC majority | ANC majority |
| | Nyandeni | 54 | 3 | 3 | 3 | 63 | ANC majority | ANC majority |
| | Mhlontlo | 40 | 2 | 2 | 7 | 51 | ANC majority | ANC majority |
| | King Sabata Dalindyebo | 46 | 3 | 3 | 20 | 72 | ANC majority | ANC majority |
| Alfred Nzo | | | | | | | ANC majority | ANC majority |
| | Matatiele | 38 | 5 | 3 | 5 | 51 | ANC majority | ANC majority |
| | Umzimvubu | 41 | 4 | 3 | 5 | 53 | ANC majority | ANC majority |
| | Mbizana | 50 | 2 | 4 | 6 | 62 | ANC majority | ANC majority |
| | Ntabankulu | 29 | 2 | 2 | 1 | 34 | ANC majority | ANC majority |

==== Free State ====
In the following table, green cells indicate those municipalities won by the ANC with Majorities. Light blue cells indicate those won by the DA with a minority or coalition, Light green cells indicate those won by the ANC with a minority or coalition.

| Municipality | ANC | DA | EFF | Others | Total | Prior Control | New Control |
Metropolitan Municipalities
| Mangaung | 58 | 27 | 9 | 6 | 100 | ANC majority | ANC majority |
District Municipalities
| Fezile Dabi | | | | | | ANC majority | ANC majority |
| Lejweleputswa | | | | | | ANC majority | ANC majority |
| Thabo Mofutsanyana | | | | | | ANC majority | ANC majority |
| Xhariep | | | | | | ANC majority | ANC majority |
Local Municipalities
| Dihlabeng | 25 | 8 | 3 | 3 | 39 | ANC majority | ANC majority |
| Kopanong | 11 | 3 | 1 | 0 | 15 | ANC majority | ANC majority |
| Letsemeng | 8 | 2 | 1 | | 11 | ANC majority | ANC majority |
| Mafube | 13 | 2 | 1 | 1 | 17 | ANC majority | ANC majority |
| Maluti-a-Phofung | 47 | 5 | 9 | 8 | 69 | ANC majority | ANC majority |
| Mantsopa | 11 | 3 | 2 | 1 | 17 | ANC majority | ANC majority |
| Masilonyana | 12 | 4 | 2 | 1 | 19 | ANC majority | ANC majority |
| Matjhabeng | 46 | 16 | 6 | 4 | 72 | ANC majority | ANC majority |
| Metsimaholo | 19 | 12 | 8 | 3 | 42 | ANC majority | ANC-SACP coalition |
| Mohokare | 7 | 2 | 2 | 0 | 11 | ANC majority | ANC majority |
| Moqhaka | 27 | 11 | 4 | 3 | 45 | ANC majority | ANC majority |
| Nala | 15 | 3 | 5 | 1 | 24 | ANC majority | ANC majority |
| Ngwathe | 24 | 8 | 3 | 1 | 36 | ANC majority | ANC majority |
| Nketoana | 13 | 3 | 1 | 1 | 18 | ANC majority | ANC majority |
| Phumelela | 12 | 2 | 1 | | 15 | ANC majority | ANC majority |
| Setsoto | 21 | 5 | 3 | 4 | 33 | ANC majority | ANC majority |
| Tokologo | 5 | 1 | 1 | 1 | 8 | ANC majority | ANC majority |
| Tswelopele | 11 | 3 | 1 | 0 | 15 | ANC majority | ANC majority |

==== Gauteng ====
In the following table, green cells indicate those municipalities won by the ANC with Majorities, light green cells indicate municipalities won by the ANC with Minorities or Coalitions. blue cells indicate municipalities won by the DA with a majority, light blue cells indicate those won by the DA with a minority or coalition.

Metropolitan Municipalities
| Municipality | | ANC | DA | EFF | Others | Total | Prior Control | New Control |
|---|---|---|---|---|---|---|---|---|
| City of Johannesburg | | 121 | 104 | 30 | 15 | 270 | ANC majority | DA-IFP-VF+ minority |
| Ekurhuleni | | 109 | 77 | 25 | 13 | 224 | ANC majority | ANC-AIC-PAC-PA coalition |
| City of Tshwane | | 89 | 93 | 25 | 7 | 214 | ANC majority | DA-VF+-ACDP minority |
Two Tier Municipalities
| District Municipality | Local Municipality | ANC | DA | EFF | Others | Total | Prior Control | New Control |
| Sedibeng | | | | | | | ANC majority | ANC majority |
| | Emfuleni | 50 | 22 | 11 | 7 | 90 | ANC majority | ANC majority |
| | Lesedi | 16 | 6 | 3 | 1 | 26 | ANC majority | ANC majority |
| | Midvaal | 9 | 17 | 2 | 1 | 29 | DA majority | DA majority |
| West Rand | | 23 | 12 | 6 | 3 | 44 | ANC majority | ANC majority |
| | Merafong City | 30 | 12 | 9 | 4 | 55 | ANC majority | ANC majority |
| | Mogale City | 38 | 27 | 9 | 3 | 77 | ANC majority | ANC minority |
| | Rand West City | 37 | 19 | 8 | 5 | 69 | ANC majority | ANC majority |

==== KwaZulu-Natal ====
In the following table, green rows indicate those won by the ANC with a majority, light green rows indicate those won by the ANC with a minority or coalition, red rows indicate those won by the Inkatha Freedom Party (IFP) with a majority, and pink rows indicate lead by an IFP minority. Orange cells indicate those one by National Freedom Party (NFP), and light orange indicate those led by NFP coalition.

Metropolitan Municipalities
| Municipality | | ANC | DA | IFP | Others | Total | Prior Control | New Control |
|---|---|---|---|---|---|---|---|---|
| eThekwini | | 126 | 61 | 10 | 22 | 219 | ANC majority | ANC majority |
Two Tier Municipalities
| District Municipality | Local Municipality | ANC | DA | IFP | Others | Total | Prior Control | New Control |
| Amajuba | | | | | | | ANC majority | ANC majority |
| | Newcastle | 41 | 6 | 11 | 9 | 67 | ANC majority | ANC majority |
| | eMadlangeni | 6 | 1 | 3 | 1 | 11 | ANC-NFP coalition | ANC majority |
| | Dannhauser | 14 | 1 | 8 | 2 | 25 | ANC-NFP coalition | ANC majority |
| Harry Gwala | | | | | | | ANC majority | ANC majority |
| | Umzimkhulu | 38 | 1 | 1 | 3 | 43 | ANC majority | ANC majority |
| | Dr Nkosazana Dlamini Zuma | 23 | 3 | 2 | 1 | 29 | ANC majority | ANC majority |
| | Ubuhlebezwe | 20 | 1 | 2 | 4 | 27 | ANC majority | ANC majority |
| | Greater Kokstad | 13 | 3 | 0 | 3 | 19 | ANC majority | ANC majority |
| iLembe | | | | | | | | ANC majority |
| | KwaDukuza | 36 | 11 | 4 | 6 | 57 | ANC majority | ANC majority |
| | Mandeni | 25 | 1 | 7 | 2 | 35 | ANC majority | ANC majority |
| | Maphumulo | 13 | 0 | 9 | 0 | 22 | ANC majority | ANC majority |
| | Ndwedwe | 27 | 1 | 8 | 1 | 37 | ANC majority | ANC majority |
| Ugu | | 23 | 5 | 6 | 1 | 35 | | ANC majority |
| | Ray Nkonyeni | 47 | 14 | 5 | 5 | 71 | ANC majority | ANC majority |
| | Umzumbe | 30 | 1 | 6 | 2 | 39 | ANC majority | ANC majority |
| | Umdoni | 23 | 7 | 3 | 4 | 37 | ANC majority | ANC majority |
| | Umuziwabantu | 14 | 1 | 4 | 1 | 20 | ANC majority | ANC majority |
| uMgungundlovu | | | | | | | | ANC majority |
| | uMngeni | 13 | 10 | 0 | 0 | 23 | ANC majority | ANC majority |
| | Msunduzi | 52 | 15 | 5 | 6 | 78 | ANC majority | ANC majority |
| | Mkhambathini | 9 | 1 | 3 | 1 | 14 | ANC majority | ANC majority |
| | uMshwathi | 20 | 2 | 4 | 1 | 27 | ANC majority | ANC majority |
| | Richmond | 11 | 2 | 0 | 1 | 14 | ANC majority | ANC majority |
| | Impendle | 6 | 0 | 1 | 0 | 7 | ANC majority | ANC majority |
| | Mooi Mpofana | 7 | 1 | 1 | 0 | 9 | ANC majority | ANC majority |
| uMkhanyakude | | | | | | | | ANC majority |
| | Jozini | 19 | 1 | 18 | 2 | 40 | ANC-NFP coalition | IFP minority |
| | Mtubatuba | 18 | 2 | 18 | 2 | 40 | ANC-NFP coalition | IFP minority |
| | uMhlabuyalingana | 22 | 1 | 10 | 2 | 35 | ANC majority | ANC majority |
| | Big Five Hlabisa | 11 | 1 | 13 | 0 | 25 | New municipality | IFP majority |
| uMzinyathi | | | | | | | ANC-NFP coalition | IFP minority |
| | Endumeni | 6 | 2 | 4 | 1 | 13 | ANC-NFP coalition | IFP minority |
| | Nquthu | 14 | 1 | 15 | 3 | 33 | ANC-NFP coalition | IFP minority |
| | Msinga | 12 | 0 | 24 | 0 | 36 | IFP majority | IFP majority |
| | Umvoti | 15 | 1 | 11 | 0 | 27 | ANC-NFP coalition | ANC majority |
| uThukela | | | | | | | | ANC Majority |
| | Alfred Duma | 46 | 4 | 16 | 6 | 72 | New municipality (Note: This municipality was formed by the merger of two municipalities, one of which was governed by an ANC-NFP Coalition, the other by an ANC majority.) | ANC majority |
| | Okhahlamba | 15 | 2 | 7 | 5 | 29 | ANC-NFP coalition | ANC majority |
| | Inkosi Langalibalele | 23 | 2 | 18 | 3 | 46 | New municipality | ANC-Ind coalition |
| Zululand | | | | | | | NFP-ANC coalition | IFP minority |
| | eDumbe | 8 | 5 | 3 | 0 | 16 | NFP majority | ANC minority |
| | UPhongolo | 15 | 2 | 10 | 2 | 29 | ANC-NFP coalition | ANC majority |
| | AbaQulusi | 21 | 3 | 19 | 1 | 44 | ANC-NFP coalition | IFP minority |
| | Nongoma | 13 | 5 | 22 | 2 | 42 | NFP-ANC coalition | IFP majority |
| | Ulundi | 11 | 0 | 35 | 1 | 47 | IFP majority | IFP majority |
| uThungulu | | | | | | | | ANC majority |
| | uMhlathuze | 43 | 8 | 13 | 3 | 67 | ANC majority | ANC majority |
| | Mfolozi | 17 | 0 | 15 | 1 | 33 | ANC majority | ANC majority |
| | uMlalazi | 30 | 1 | 22 | 1 | 54 | ANC-NFP coalition | ANC majority |
| | Mthonjaneni | 10 | 0 | 14 | 1 | 25 | ANC-NFP coalition | IFP majority |
| | Nkandla | 12 | 0 | 15 | 0 | 27 | ANC-NFP coalition | IFP majority |

==== Limpopo ====
In the following table, green cells indicate those municipalities won by the ANC with Majorities. Light blue cells indicate those won by the DA with a minority or coalition.

| Municipality | ANC | DA | EFF | Others | Total | Prior Control | New Control |
District Municipalities
| Capricorn | | | | | | ANC majority | ANC majority |
| Mopani | | | | | | ANC majority | ANC majority |
| Sekhukhune | | | | | | ANC majority | ANC majority |
| Vhembe | | | | | | ANC majority | ANC majority |
| Waterberg | 19 | 7 | 8 | 1 | 35 | ANC majority | ANC majority |
Local Municipalities
| Blouberg | 33 | 2 | 8 | 1 | 44 | ANC majority | ANC majority |
| Lepele-Nkumpi | 40 | 3 | 15 | 2 | 60 | ANC majority | ANC majority |
| Polokwane | 52 | 10 | 26 | 2 | 90 | ANC majority | ANC majority |
| Ba-Phalaborwa | 26 | 4 | 6 | 1 | 37 | ANC majority | ANC majority |
| Greater Giyani | 51 | 2 | 5 | 4 | 62 | ANC majority | ANC majority |
| Greater Letaba | 46 | 2 | 9 | 3 | 60 | ANC majority | ANC majority |
| Greater Tzaneen | 52 | 7 | 8 | 2 | 69 | ANC majority | ANC majority |
| Maruleng | 15 | 3 | 5 | 4 | 27 | ANC majority | ANC majority |
| Elias Motsoaledi | 41 | 5 | 10 | 4 | 61 | ANC majority | ANC majority |
| Ephraim Mogale | 20 | 3 | 7 | 2 | 32 | ANC majority | ANC majority |
| Greater Tubatse | 54 | 4 | 15 | 4 | 77 | ANC majority | ANC majority |
| Makhuduthamaga | 43 | 2 | 14 | 3 | 62 | ANC majority | ANC majority |
| Makhado | 56 | 9 | 7 | 3 | 75 | ANC majority | ANC majority |
| Musina | 18 | 3 | 3 | 0 | 24 | ANC majority | ANC majority |
| Thulamela | 64 | 4 | 8 | 5 | 81 | ANC majority | ANC majority |
| Bela-Bela | 9 | 5 | 2 | 1 | 17 | ANC majority | ANC majority |
| Lephalale | 17 | 4 | 5 | 0 | 26 | ANC majority | ANC majority |
| Molemole | 23 | 2 | 7 | 0 | 32 | ANC majority | ANC majority |
| Mogalakwena | 41 | 6 | 13 | 4 | 64 | ANC majority | ANC majority |
| Modimolle–Mookgophong | 13 | 7 | 6 | 2 | 28 | ANC majority | DA minority |
| Thabazimbi | 10 | 5 | 5 | 3 | 23 | ANC majority | DA minority |

==== Mpumalanga ====
The ANC's control of the municipalities in this province was not significantly challenged with the party winning over 55% support in every municipality. The DA failed to make any progress in this historically strongly ANC region, with the party's vote share shrinking by a few percentage points overall against a national backdrop of gains for the party. Due in large part to the lack of substantial DA support across the province, the EFF was able to become the main opposition to the ANC in four of the seventeen municipalities.

In the following table, green rows indicate those won by the ANC.

| Municipality | ANC | DA | EFF | Others | Total | Prior Control | New Control |
District Municipalities
| Ehlanzeni | | | | | | ANC majority | ANC majority |
| Gert Sibande | | | | | | ANC majority | ANC majority |
| Nkangala | | | | | | ANC majority | ANC majority |
Local Municipalities
| Albert Luthuli | 41 | 2 | 4 | 2 | 49 | ANC majority | ANC majority |
| Msukaligwa | 29 | 5 | 3 | 1 | 38 | ANC majority | ANC majority |
| Mkhondo | 29 | 3 | 2 | 4 | 38 | ANC majority | ANC majority |
| Pixley ka Seme | 17 | 2 | 1 | 1 | 21 | ANC majority | ANC majority |
| Lekwa | 20 | 5 | 2 | 3 | 30 | ANC majority | ANC majority |
| Dipaleseng | 9 | 2 | 1 | 0 | 12 | ANC majority | ANC majority |
| Govan Mbeki | 36 | 15 | 9 | 3 | 63 | ANC majority | ANC majority |
| Victor Khanye | 11 | 4 | 2 | 0 | 17 | ANC majority | ANC majority |
| Emalahleni | 41 | 17 | 8 | 2 | 68 | ANC majority | ANC majority |
| Steve Tshwete | 32 | 17 | 7 | 2 | 58 | ANC majority | ANC majority |
| Emakhazeni | 11 | 3 | 1 | 0 | 15 | ANC majority | ANC majority |
| Thembisile Hani | 49 | 3 | 9 | 3 | 64 | ANC majority | ANC majority |
| Dr JS Moroka | 43 | 4 | 10 | 5 | 62 | ANC majority | ANC majority |
| Thaba Chweu | 17 | 7 | 2 | 1 | 27 | ANC majority | ANC majority |
| Nkomazi | 54 | 4 | 7 | 0 | 65 | ANC majority | ANC majority |
| Bushbuckridge | 53 | 3 | 4 | 16 | 76 | ANC majority | ANC majority |
| Mbombela | 69 | 13 | 6 | 2 | 90 | ANC majority | ANC majority |

==== North West ====
In the following table, green rows indicate those won by the ANC, and light green rows indicate those with an ANC minority or coalition. The municipal boundaries are determined by the Organised Local Government Act, 1997 (Act 52 of 1997)

| Municipality | ANC | DA | EFF | Others | Total | Prior Control | New Control |
District Municipalities
| Dr Ruth Segomotsi Mompati | | | | | | ANC majority | ANC majority |
| Ngaka Modiri Molema | | | | | | ANC majority | ANC majority |
| Bojanala | | | | | | ANC majority | ANC majority |
| Dr Kenneth Kaunda | | | | | | ANC majority | ANC majority |
Local Municipalities
| Ditsobotla | 25 | 6 | 5 | 3 | 40 | ANC majority | ANC majority |
| Kagisano-Molopo | 22 | 2 | 2 | 3 | 29 | ANC majority | ANC majority |
| Greater Taung | 34 | 2 | 6 | 6 | 48 | ANC majority | ANC majority |
| Kgetlengrivier | 8 | 3 | 3 | 1 | 15 | ANC majority | ANC majority |
| Lekwa-Teemane | 10 | 3 | 1 | 2 | 16 | ANC majority | ANC majority |
| Madibeng | 45 | 16 | 14 | 6 | 81 | ANC majority | ANC majority |
| Mafikeng | 43 | 7 | 12 | 7 | 69 | ANC majority | ANC majority |
| Mamusa | 11 | 1 | 2 | 4 | 18 | ANC majority | ANC majority |
| Maquassi Hills | 14 | 3 | 2 | 3 | 22 | ANC majority | ANC majority |
| Matlosana | 46 | 17 | 7 | 7 | 77 | ANC majority | ANC majority |
| Moretele | 38 | 4 | 8 | 2 | 52 | ANC majority | ANC majority |
| Moses Kotane | 45 | 4 | 15 | 4 | 68 | ANC majority | ANC majority |
| Naledi | 13 | 5 | 2 | 0 | 20 | ANC majority | ANC majority |
| Ramotshere Moiloa | 23 | 2 | 6 | 7 | 38 | ANC majority | ANC majority |
| Ratlou | 20 | 2 | 3 | 3 | 28 | ANC majority | ANC majority |
| Rustenburg | 43 | 14 | 24 | 8 | 89 | ANC majority | ANC-AIC-BCM coalition |
| Tswaing | 20 | 5 | 2 | 1 | 29 | ANC majority | ANC majority |
| JB Marks | 34 | 22 | 5 | 6 | 67 | ANC majority | ANC majority |

==== Northern Cape ====
In the following table, green rows indicate those won by the ANC majority, and light green cells indicate municipalities led by an ANC coalition or minority. Light blue rows indicate municipalities won led by a DA coalition or minority. Yellow cells indicate municipalities led by a COPE coalition or minority.

| Municipality | ANC | DA | EFF | Others | Total | Prior Control | New Control |
District Municipalities
| Frances Baard | | | | | | ANC majority | ANC majority |
| John Taolo Gaetsewe | | | | | | ANC majority | ANC majority |
| Namakwa | | | | | | ANC majority | ANC majority |
| Pixley ka Seme | | | | | | ANC majority | ANC majority |
| ZF Mgcawu | | | | | | ANC majority | ANC majority |
Local Municipalities
| Richtersveld | 4 | 3 | 0 | 0 | 7 | ANC majority | ANC majority |
| Nama Khoi | 8 | 7 | 0 | 2 | 17 | DA-COPE coalition | ANC-KSR coalition |
| Kamiesberg | 4 | 2 | 1 | 0 | 7 | ANC majority | ANC majority |
| Hantam | 5 | 4 | 0 | 0 | 9 | DA-COPE coalition | ANC majority |
| Karoo Hoogland | 4 | 2 | 0 | 1 | 7 | COPE-DA coalition | ANC majority |
| Khâi-Ma | 4 | 2 | 0 | 1 | 7 | ANC majority | ANC majority |
| Ubuntu | 3 | 2 | 0 | 2 | 7 | ANC minority | ANC minority |
| Umsobomvu | 7 | 3 | 1 | 0 | 11 | ANC majority | ANC majority |
| Emthanjeni | 9 | 5 | 1 | 0 | 15 | ANC-Ind coalition | ANC majority |
| Kareeberg | 4 | 2 | 1 | 0 | 7 | ANC majority | ANC majority |
| Renosterberg | 4 | 3 | 0 | 0 | 7 | ANC majority | ANC majority |
| Thembelihle | 4 | 2 | 1 | 0 | 7 | ANC majority | ANC majority |
| Siyathemba | 6 | 3 | 0 | 0 | 9 | ANC majority | ANC majority |
| Siyancuma | 8 | 3 | 2 | 0 | 13 | ANC majority | ANC majority |
| Kai !Garib | 11 | 5 | 1 | 2 | 19 | ANC majority | ANC majority |
| !Kheis | 4 | 1 | 0 | 2 | 7 | ANC majority | ANC majority |
| Tsantsabane | 7 | 2 | 1 | 3 | 13 | ANC majority | ANC majority |
| Kgatelopele | 3 | 2 | 0 | 2 | 7 | ANC majority | KGF-DA coalition |
| Dawid Kruiper | 18 | 10 | 1 | 2 | 31 | New municipality (Note: This municipality was formed by the merger of two municipalities, both governed by an ANC majority.) | ANC majority |
| Sol Plaatje | 38 | 19 | 5 | 3 | 65 | ANC majority | ANC majority |
| Dikgatlong | 9 | 2 | 2 | 0 | 13 | ANC majority | ANC majority |
| Magareng | 5 | 2 | 2 | 0 | 9 | ANC majority | ANC majority |
| Phokwane | 12 | 3 | 3 | 1 | 19 | ANC majority | ANC majority |
| Joe Morolong | 21 | 1 | 6 | 1 | 29 | ANC majority | ANC majority |
| Ga-Segonyana | 18 | 3 | 5 | 1 | 27 | ANC majority | ANC majority |
| Gamagara | 7 | 5 | 1 | 0 | 13 | ANC majority | ANC majority |

==== Western Cape ====
In the following table, green cells indicate those municipalities won by the ANC with Majorities, light green cells indicate municipalities won by the ANC with Minorities or Coalitions. blue cells indicate municipalities won by the DA with a majority, light blue cells indicate those won by the DA with a minority or coalition.

| Municipality | ANC | DA | EFF | Others | Total | Prior Control | New Control |
Metropolitan Municipalities
| City of Cape Town | 57 | 154 | 7 | 13 | 231 | DA majority | DA majority |
District Municipalities
| West Coast | 9 | 16 | 0 | 0 | 25 | DA majority | DA majority |
| Cape Winelands | 11 | 27 | 2 | 1 | 41 | DA majority | DA majority |
| Overberg | 7 | 14 | 0 | 0 | 21 | DA majority | DA majority |
| Garden Route | 12 | 21 | 0 | 2 | 35 | DA-led coalition | DA majority |
| Central Karoo | 4 | 6 | 0 | 3 | 13 | ANC-KGP coalition | DA-KGP coalition |
Local Municipalities
| Beaufort West | 6 | 6 | 0 | 1 | 13 | ANC majority | DA-KDF coalition |
| Bergrivier | 4 | 9 | 0 | 0 | 13 | DA majority | DA majority |
| Breede Valley | 12 | 22 | 1 | 6 | 41 | DA majority | DA majority |
| Bitou | 6 | 6 | 0 | 1 | 13 | DA majority | DA-AUF coalition |
| Cape Agulhas | 3 | 6 | 0 | 2 | 11 | ANC-Ind coalition | DA majority |
| Cederberg | 4 | 6 | 0 | 1 | 11 | ANC majority | DA majority |
| Drakenstein | 15 | 43 | 2 | 5 | 65 | DA majority | DA majority |
| George | 16 | 29 | 1 | 7 | 53 | DA majority | DA majority |
| Hessequa | 8 | 8 | 0 | 1 | 17 | DA-COPE coalition | DA-FF+ coalition |
| Kannaland | 2 | 2 | 0 | 3 | 7 | ICOSA-ANC coalition | ANC-DA coalition (in doubt) |
| Knysna | 7 | 10 | 0 | 4 | 21 | DA majority | DA-ACDP coalition |
| Laingsburg | 3 | 3 | 0 | 1 | 7 | DA-COPE coalition | DA-KOP coalition |
| Langeberg | 6 | 12 | 1 | 4 | 23 | DA-COPE coalition | DA majority |
| Matzikama | 5 | 8 | 1 | 1 | 15 | ANC-led coalition | DA majority |
| Mossel Bay | 7 | 17 | 0 | 3 | 27 | DA majority | DA majority |
| Oudtshoorn | 7 | 14 | 1 | 3 | 25 | Under Administration | DA majority |
| Overstrand | 8 | 16 | 1 | 0 | 25 | DA majority | DA majority |
| Prince Albert | 2 | 3 | 0 | 2 | 7 | KGP-ANC coalition | DA-KGP coalition |
| Saldanha Bay | 8 | 17 | 1 | 1 | 27 | DA majority | DA majority |
| Stellenbosch | 8 | 30 | 2 | 3 | 43 | DA majority | DA majority |
| Swartland | 6 | 16 | 1 | 0 | 23 | DA majority | DA majority |
| Swellendam | 5 | 6 | 0 | 0 | 11 | DA-ACDP coalition | DA majority |
| Theewaterskloof | 10 | 14 | 1 | 2 | 27 | DA majority | DA majority |
| Witzenberg | 8 | 11 | 1 | 3 | 23 | DA-COPE-Ind-DCP coalition | DA-COPE coalition |
