= Ratanda =

- Location within Gauteng Location within South Africa
- Coordinates: 26°33′S 28°20′E
- Country: South Africa
- Province: Gauteng
- District: Sedibeng
- Municipality: Lesedi

Area
  - Total: 6.50 km^{2} (2.51 sq mi)

Population (2011)
  - Total: 36,102
  - Density: 5,550/km^{2} (14,400/sq mi)

Racial makeup (2011)
  - Black African: 99.1%
  - Coloured: 0.4%
  - Indian/Asian: 0.2%
  - Other: 0.3%

First languages (2011)
  - Zulu: 50.6%
  - Sotho: 35.5%
  - Xhosa: 5.0%
  - English: 1.5%
  - Other: 7.3%
- Time zone: UTC+2 (SAST)
- Postal code (street): 1441
- PO box: 1443

Ratanda is a township south of Heidelberg in Gauteng, South Africa.

It was established in 1955. Ratanda was one of the first townships to be affected by unrest which broke out in 1984 on the highveld.

Ratanda has 23 different extensions, of which extension 1 is the higher class level and extension 7 being the lowest income housing. Ratanda is derived from two Native African languages "Rata" meaning (SeSotho)= Love and "Thanda" (IsiZulu)= Love. Hence Ratanda, meaning a place of Love for the people for the locals who fell in love with the place.
