= Randfontein Local Municipality =

Randfontein
- Local municipality
- Seal

- Location of Randfontein Local Municipality within Gauteng
- Coordinates: 26°10′S 27°40′E
- Country: South Africa
- Province: Gauteng
- District: West Rand
- Seat: Randfontein
- Wards: 22

Government
  - Type: Municipal council
  - Mayor: Sylvia Thebenare (ANC)

Area
  - Total: 475 km^{2} (183 sq mi)

Population (2011)
  - Total: 149,286
  - Density: 314/km^{2} (814/sq mi)

Racial makeup (2011)
  - Black African: 69.2%
  - Coloured: 9.8%
  - Indian/Asian: 0.4%
  - White: 20.1%

First languages (2011)
  - Tswana: 34.1%
  - Afrikaans: 28.9%
  - Xhosa: 8.0%
  - Sotho: 6.4%
  - Other: 22.6%
- Time zone: UTC+2 (SAST)
- Municipal code: GT482

Randfontein Local Municipality was a local municipality in West Rand District Municipality, Gauteng, in South Africa. After municipal elections on 3 August 2016, it was merged with the Westonaria Local Municipality to form the larger Rand West City Local Municipality.

Randfontein Local Municipality is characterized by high levels of unemployment, poverty, major crime, and low levels of education and income. Nonetheless, it has become the migration destination for many South Africans seeking a better quality of life in Gauteng.

== Main places ==
The 2001 census divided the municipality into the following main places:

Place	Code	Area (km^{2})	Population	Most spoken language
Bhongweni	70201	0.20	1,473	Tswana
Brandvlei	70202	0.07	308	Tswana
Mohlakeng	70203	5.31	49,442	Tswana
Panvlak Gold Mine	70204	1.96	1,333	Zulu
Randfontein	70205	209.70	47,256	Afrikaans
Toekomsrus	70206	3.07	15,191	Afrikaans
Zenzele	70207	0.67	7,222	Tswana
Remainder of the municipality	70208	260.51	6,620	Tswana

== Politics ==
The municipal council consists of forty-four members elected by mixed-member proportional representation. Twenty-two councillors are elected by first-past-the-post voting in twenty-two wards, while the remaining twenty-two are chosen from party lists so that the total number of party representatives is proportional to the number of votes received. In the election of 18 May 2011 the African National Congress (ANC) won a majority of twenty-seven seats on the council. The following table shows the results of the election.

Party	Votes				Seats		
Party	Ward	List	Total	%	Ward	List	Total
ANC	26,493	26,695	53,188	60.4	14	13	27
DA	15,777	15,995	31,772	36.1	8	8	16
COPE	803	764	1,567	1.8	0	1	1
VF+	510	460	970	1.1	0	0	0
ACDP	341	233	574	0.7	0	0	0
NFP	23	–	23	0.0	0	–	0
Total	43,947	44,147	88,094	100.0	22	22	44
Spoilt votes	687	576	1,263				
