= Ernesto Alfabeto Nhamuave =

Death of Ernesto Alfabeto Nhamuave
- Date: 18 May 2008
- Perpetrator: unknown
- Motive: xenophobia

Ernesto Alfabeto Nhamuave (1973–2008) was a 35-year-old Mozambican from Vuca Village, Inhambane. He came to South Africa as an economic migrant, and worked as a labourer on construction sites. He and his brother-in-law, Francisco Kanze, were cornered by a mob and were beaten, stabbed and stoned. Nhamuave was set alight in the Ramaphosa informal settlement (next to Reiger Park) on 18 May 2008. A haunting image, the silhouette of the "Burning Man", was shared through international media. This picture became a visible reference point for the other 62 people who died during the 2008 xenophobic attacks.

Shayne Robinson, Halden Krog, Kim Ludbrook, Beauregard Tromp and Simphiwe Nkwali were journalists at the scene. No one was charged with his murder. Although a case was opened at the Reiger Park Police Station, the SAHRC could not locate these records, and in 2010, the case was closed. The site of his murder is unmarked.
