= Devon, South Africa =

Devon
- Location within Gauteng Location within South Africa
- Coordinates: 26.356389°S 28.785°E
- Country: South Africa
- Province: Gauteng
- District: Sedibeng
- Municipality: Lesedi

Area
  - Total: 1.37 km^{2} (0.53 sq mi)

Population (2011)
  - Total: 347
  - Density: 253/km^{2} (656/sq mi)

Racial makeup (2011)
  - Black African: 44.7%
  - Coloured: 2.3%
  - Indian/Asian: 8.9%
  - White: 42.4%
  - Other: 1.7%

First languages (2011)
  - Afrikaans: 41.9%
  - Zulu: 26.2%
  - English: 11.6%
  - S. Ndebele: 7.0%
  - Other: 13.4%
- Time zone: UTC+2 (SAST)
- PO box: 2260
- Area code: 017

Devon is a settlement in Sedibeng District Municipality in the Gauteng province of South Africa.

== History ==
Village some 18 km west of Leslie and 40 km east-south-east of Springs. Named after the home county in England of the surveyor who laid it out. Important for natural gas in the vicinity.
