= Welverdiend, Ehlanzeni =

Welverdiend
- Location within Mpumalanga Location within South Africa
- Coordinates: 24.581°S 31.343°E
- Country: South Africa
- Province: Mpumalanga
- District: Ehlanzeni
- Municipality: Bushbuckridge

Area
  - Total: 6.12 km^{2} (2.36 sq mi)

Population (2011)
  - Total: 7,601
  - Density: 1,240/km^{2} (3,220/sq mi)

Racial makeup (2011)
  - Black African: 99.9%

First languages (2011)
  - Tsonga: 86.3%
  - Sotho: 7.0%
  - Northern Sotho: 5.6%
  - Other: 1.1%
- Time zone: UTC+2 (SAST)
- Postal code (street): 2499
- PO box: 2495
- Area code: 013

Welverdiend is a village in Ehlanzeni District Municipality in the Mpumalanga province of South Africa. It is situated off the road from Acornhoek to Orpen rest camp in the Kruger National Park, adjacent to the Timbavati village.
