= Reiger Park =

- Interactive map of Reiger Park
- Coordinates: 26.231°S 28.216°E
- Country: South Africa
- Province: Gauteng
- Municipality: Ekurhuleni

Area
  - Total: 3.46 km^{2} (1.34 sq mi)

Population (2011)
  - Total: 39,345
  - Density: 11,400/km^{2} (29,500/sq mi)

Racial makeup (2011)
  - Black African: 51.7%
  - Coloured: 46.6%
  - White: 0.3%
  - Other: 0.5%

First languages (2011)
  - Afrikaans: 43.1%
  - Xhosa: 13.4%
  - Northern Sotho: 12.6%
  - Sotho: 7.3%
  - Other: 23.6%
- Time zone: UTC+2 (SAST)

Reiger Park is a coloured residential area that is situated close to Boksburg in the Ekurhuleni Metropolitan Municipality, Gauteng, South Africa. Historically, this township was once known as Stirtonville's when it was first proclaimed. Boksburg municipality had been a residential centre, with a lake and quiet streets and was known as the mother town of the east rand. Following World War two and rapid industrialisation, people migrated into town, from rural areas seeking work on the gold mines and Stirtonville's population doubled. The racially diverse community and its'proximity to the town of Boksburg would be re-shaped by Apartheid and Verwoerd's policies of separate development and forced removals.

In 1963 / 64 the composition of this community was altered. Black people were moved to Vosloorus, the Indians to Actonville and those classified as "Coloureds" were either left to stay in Stirtonville, or "coloured" people were forcibly removed, from other East Rand towns and relocated to Stirtonville, where they initially lived in zinc houses. The area was renamed as Reiger Park and gangsterism and drugs became prominent social issues.

In 1987, in the local elections, when the Conservative Party attained a majority in the local council elections, petty apartheid was re-introduced into the town of Boksburg. Reiger Park residents responded to this with a consumer boycott, also known as the Boksburg Boycott. In 1988, residents of Reiger Park staged a protest picnic in a traditionally whites only recreation area, and were beaten up,

Locals residents have given their own unofficial names to the different areas of Reiger Park, such as Jerusalem (due to the many churches in that area); Excuse Me (due to the houses being close together that neighbours say "bless you" when one sneezes); Popcorn Valley, a RDP housing developed in the 1990s with homes popping up so fast that they were likened to popcorn. 1997, the Popcorn Valley area was another township afflicted by violent rent boycotts.

Ramaphosa is an informal settlement that was established to the west of Reiger Park in 1994. The disparities between Reiger Park and Ramaphosa are stark. Residents face untarred roads, inadequite sanitation, water, and waste disposal. Over crowding exacerbates infrastructure and illegal electricity connections leads to over burdened transformers, disconnections and protests. Abandoned mine shafts and mine dumps introduce further health and environmental challenges.

On 11 May 2008, foreign nationals were violently attacked. Reiger Park and Ramaphosa were a prominent sites of violence during the 2008 anti-immigrant riots. International media captured Ernesto Alfabeto Nhamuave's emmoluation on headline news and the area was described as a "war zone", with residents reporting that 12 people were killed. Parliament visited Alexandra, Tembisa, Germiston and Reiger Park, Ramaphosaville to probe the violence and attacks.

Galeview, a section of Reiger Park, is also considered to be a hot spot, due to gangsterism and mastermind criminals who reside in the area.

== Famous Residents ==
In 1965, the South African footballer, Albert Johanneson, whose parents were forcibly moved to Stirtonville, played for Leeds United as winger in English FA Cup Final and became South Africa's first black English football superstar. Reiger Park is also the home town of former Kaizer Chiefs midfielder Bernard Parker who was born and raised there, as well as Shandre Campbell who played for Club Brugge KV.
