= Westonaria =

- Location within Gauteng Location within South Africa
- Coordinates: 26°19′4″S 27°39′2″E
- Country: South Africa
- Province: Gauteng
- District: West Rand
- Municipality: Rand West City
- Established: 1948

Area
  - Total: 12.65 km^{2} (4.88 sq mi)

Population (2011)
  - Total: 10,259
  - Density: 811.0/km^{2} (2,100/sq mi)

Racial makeup (2011)
  - Black African: 65.5%
  - Coloured: 1.4%
  - Indian/Asian: 1.0%
  - White: 31.9%
  - Other: 0.2%

First languages (2011)
  - Afrikaans: 28.8%
  - Xhosa: 16.6%
  - Sotho: 14.0%
  - Tswana: 13.4%
  - Other: 27.1%
- Time zone: UTC+2 (SAST)
- Postal code (street): 1779
- PO box: 1780
- Area code: 011
- Website: http://westonaria.co.za/

Westonaria is a town in the west of Gauteng province of South Africa. It is situated in the Rand West City Local Municipality, part of the West Rand District Municipality. During the apartheid era, Africans lived outside town in Bekkersdal. The town is some 45 km west of Johannesburg and 18 km south of Randfontein.

== History ==
It was formed in 1948 by the amalgamation of the townships Venterspost, proclaimed in 1937, and Westonaria, proclaimed in 1938. First called Venterspost, the name was changed to Westonaria when municipal status was attained in 1952. The name is a homophone of ‘western area’, after the township developing company Western Areas Ltd.
