= Kagiso =

- Location within Gauteng Location within South Africa
- Coordinates: 26°8′S 27°47′E
- Country: South Africa
- Province: Gauteng
- District: West Rand
- Municipality: Mogale City

Area
  - Total: 14.17 km^{2} (5.47 sq mi)
- Elevation: 1,760 m (5,770 ft)

Population (2011)
  - Total: 115,802
  - Density: 8,172/km^{2} (21,170/sq mi)

Racial makeup (2011)
  - Black African: 99.3%
  - Coloured: 0.4%
  - Indian/Asian: 0.1%
  - White: 0.1%
  - Other: 0.2%

First languages (2011)
  - Tswana: 47.6%
  - Zulu: 14.7%
  - Xhosa: 12.1%
  - Sotho: 6.9%
  - Other: 18.6%
- Time zone: UTC+2 (SAST)
- Postal code (street): 1744
- PO box: 1754

Kagiso is a township situated at the southern end of the Mogale City Local Municipality, just south of Krugersdorp in Gauteng Province, South Africa. The word kagiso means peace in Tswana. Kagiso's administration comprises five wards, each headed by a councillor.

== History ==
Kagiso was established in 1920 by ex-miners and squatters from nearby Luipaardsvlei. By 1950, there were about 3 436 people in the Luipaardsvlei Township, an area of only 47 morgen, until another new township - Lewisham - was laid out to the south-east of Krugersdorp.

== Demographics ==
Setswana is the most spoken language in Kagiso. There is considerable migration into the area from the rural areas, with people seeking work in nearby Krugersdorp and Chamdor. Some people who live in Kagiso travel to Johannesburg for work.

Kagiso has produced many notable men and women, one of them being the Reverend Dr Frank Chikane, the former secretary general of the South African Council of Churches and a former director-general in the President's Office. Kagiso is the hometown of former Gauteng premier Nomvula Mokonyane.

Notable celebrities that have been strongly associated with Kagiso at some point include the musicians Mafikizolo and former Orlando Pirates soccer player Meshack Wonder Mjanqeka.

== Sport ==
Recreational facilities in the area include a multipurpose sports center, which has a cricket pitch, soccer fields, tennis courts and a swimming pool.

== Infrastructure ==
=== Health ===
The public health needs of people in the area are catered for by the Leratong Hospital. There are two clinics in the area and a mobile clinic operates in the township as well. Private healthcare needs are provided by private doctors with private surgeries equipped with medical facilities.

=== Police & Judiciary Services ===
Policing services are provided by a recently built Kagiso Police Station located alongside the Kagiso Magistrate Court, also recently built. The two facilities cater to Kagiso Central and various Extensions' residents, including other sprawling areas around the township which include Tshepisong, Reitvalley, and Extensions 2 & 3.

=== Bulk Services ===
Potable water is provided by the local municipality by utilizing reservoir facilities located within the township. Sewage treatment facilities are located on the outskirts of the township.

=== Retail Shopping Facilities ===
The township shopping needs are provided by various shopping malls around the township, including Kagiso Shopping Mall, Chamdor Shopping Center as well as supermarkets and convenient spaza shops located in convenient areas within the township.

== Education ==
There are 15 primary schools and seven secondary schools (Mosupatsela Secondary School, Madiba Comprehensive School, Mandisa Shiceka High School, Boipelo Secondary School, S.G Mafaesa, Kagiso Secondary School, and Thuto-Pele High School.) in the area. Mosupatsela and Kagiso secondary schools, are the oldest high schools in the township, with the former being the oldest of the two schools. There is also an adult center, which aids adults wanting to improve their education. Kagiso has an Old library, which has a reference section and embodies a children's library.

The township is also home to the recently launched, Kagiso (Gauteng) Archives Center, next to which a recently built modern library, is located. The facility is meant to harbor important heritage and historical records as well as information.

There are several formal creches including three big ones, and about 50 informal ones.

The township also has schools for both the physically and mentally handicapped.

== Notable people ==
- Nomvula Mokonyane
- Pitso Mosimane
- Zenande Mfenyana
