= Lesedi Local Municipality =

Lesedi
- Local municipality
- Seal

- Location in Gauteng
- Coordinates: 26°30′S 28°30′E
- Country: South Africa
- Province: Gauteng
- District: Sedibeng
- Seat: Heidelberg
- Wards: 13

Government
  - Type: Municipal council
  - Mayor: Mluleki Nkosi (ANC)

Area
  - Total: 1,484 km^{2} (573 sq mi)

Population (2011)
  - Total: 99,520
  - Density: 67.06/km^{2} (173.7/sq mi)

Racial makeup (2011)
  - Black African: 77.3%
  - Coloured: 1.2%
  - Indian/Asian: 1.3%
  - White: 19.7%

First languages (2011)
  - Zulu: 40.8%
  - Sotho: 21.9%
  - Afrikaans: 19.5%
  - English: 5.0%
  - Other: 12.8%
- Time zone: UTC+2 (SAST)
- Municipal code: GT423

Lesedi Municipality (Zulu: UMasipala wase Lesedi; Sotho: Masepala wa Lesedi; Afrikaans: Lesedi Munisipaliteit) is a local municipality within the Sedibeng District Municipality, in the Gauteng province of South Africa. Heidelberg is the seat of the municipality. During the first war of independence, Heidelberg served as capital of the South African Republic, from 1880 to 1883.

Lesedi is a Sesotho word meaning "light". The name was decided upon because the municipality represents the light of the area.

== Politics ==
The municipal council consists of twenty-six members elected by mixed-member proportional representation. Thirteen councillors are elected by first-past-the-post voting in thirteen wards, while the remaining thirteen are chosen from party lists so that the total number of party representatives is proportional to the number of votes received. In the election of 4 November 2024 no party won a majority. The Democratic Alliance received the highest percentage of votes, but the African National Congress (ANC) won the most seats due to overhang as a result of it winning nine wards.

In 2013, a proposal was made for the Lesedi Local Municipality to cease being a local municipality under the Sedibeng District Municipality and to be merged into the City of Ekurhuleni Metropolitan Municipality after the 2016 municipal elections. The Democratic Alliance opposed the proposal and challenged it. As a result, the planned absorption of the Lesedi municipality into Ekurhuleni after the 2016 municipal elections was blocked by the High Court of South Africa in 2015.

The following table shows the results of the 2026 election.

Party	Ward			List			Total seats
Party	Votes	%	Seats	Votes	%	Seats	Total seats
Democratic Alliance	9,544	29.64	4	9,541	29.47	3	7
African National Congress	9,504	29.52	9	9,307	28.74	0	9
uMkhonto weSizwe Party	4,111	12.77	0	4,645	14.35	3	3
Economic Freedom Fighters	2,430	7.55	0	2,262	6.99	2	2
Freedom Front Plus	2,029	6.30	0	2,076	6.41	2	2
ActionSA	1,143	3.55	0	1,191	3.68	1	1
South African Communist Party	1,100	3.42	0	1,086	3.35	1	1
Bopa Sechaba Community Movement	357	1.11	0	360	1.11	1	1
20 other parties	1,979	6.15	0	1,912	5.90	0	0
Total	32,197	100.00	13	32,380	100.00	13	26
Valid votes	32,197	98.59		32,380	98.86		
Invalid/blank votes	462	1.41		375	1.14		
Total votes	32,659	100.00		32,755	100.00		
Registered voters/turnout	55,720	58.61		55,720	58.78		

== Main places ==
The 2001 census divided the municipality into the following main places:

Place	Code	Area (km^{2})	Population	Most spoken language
Devon	70601	1.72	704	Afrikaans
Heidelberg	70602	30.16	11,614	Afrikaans
Impumelelo	70603	1.44	6,226	Zulu
Ratanda	70606	4.15	35,145	Zulu
Remainder of the municipality	70604	1,378.90	16,350	Zulu

== Management ==
In 2021 The Hawks arrested Mr Tshepo Malekana, development and planning manager at the municipality, for allegedly defrauding the municipality by selling vacant municipal land unlawfully and illegally between 2017 and 2019. He allegedly received cash payments totaling R100 million.
