= Mogale City Local Municipality =

Mogale City
- Local municipality
- Seal

- Location in Gauteng
- Coordinates: 26°0′S 27°40′E
- Country: South Africa
- Province: Gauteng
- District: West Rand
- Seat: Krugersdorp
- Wards: 34

Government
  - Type: Municipal council

Area
  - Total: 1,342 km^{2} (518 sq mi)

Population (2011)
  - Total: 362,422
  - Density: 270.1/km^{2} (699.5/sq mi)

Racial makeup (2011)
  - Black African: 75.6%
  - Coloured: 0.8%
  - Indian/Asian: 2.2%
  - White: 21.0%

First languages (2011)
  - Tswana: 31.7%
  - Afrikaans: 17.2%
  - Zulu: 11.2%
  - English: 9.7%
  - Other: 30.2%
- Time zone: UTC+2 (SAST)
- Municipal code: GT481

Mogale City Local Municipality (Tswana: Mmasepala wa Mogale City; Afrikaans: Mogale City Munisipaliteit; Zulu: UMasipala wase Mogale City) is a local municipality within the West Rand District Municipality, in the Gauteng province of South Africa.

== Main places ==
The 2001 census divided the municipality into the following main places:

Place	Code	Area (km^{2})	Population	Most spoken language
Kagiso	70101	21.12	100,940	Tswana
Krugersdorp	70102	195.99	86,614	Afrikaans
Magaliesburg	70103	7.43	2,512	Tswana
Mogale City	70109	0.61	1,411	Tswana
Muldersdrift	70105	18.07	599	Tswana
Munsieville	70106	1.81	19,837	Tswana
Orient Hills	70107	0.23	1,083	Tswana
Rietvallei	70108	2.83	31,261	Tswana
Remainder of the municipality	70104	847.97	45,457	Tswana

== Politics ==
The municipal council consists of seventy-seven members elected by mixed-member proportional representation. Thirty-nine councillors are elected by first-past-the-post voting in thirty-nine wards, while the remaining thirty-eight are chosen from party lists so that the total number of party representatives is proportional to the number of votes received.

In the election of 4 November 2026 no party won a majority. The Democratic Alliance (DA) won the largest number of seats.

The following table shows the results of the election.

Party	Ward			List			Total seats
Party	Votes	%	Seats	Votes	%	Seats	Total seats
Democratic Alliance	40,490	36.64	16	40,597	36.67	11	27
African National Congress	28,890	26.14	23	28,471	25.72	0	23
Freedom Front Plus	10,084	9.13	0	10,212	9.22	7	7
ActionSA	9,550	8.64	0	10,024	9.05	7	7
Economic Freedom Fighters	9,044	8.18	0	8,400	7.59	6	6
uMkhonto weSizwe Party	1,593	1.44	0	3,576	3.23	2	2
South African Communist Party	2,014	1.82	0	1,868	1.69	1	1
Rise Mzansi	1,112	1.01	0	1,020	0.92	1	1
Inkatha Freedom Party	922	0.83	0	870	0.79	1	1
African Transformation Movement	661	0.60	0	907	0.82	1	1
Pan Africanist Congress of Azania	737	0.67	0	796	0.72	1	1
Independent candidates	904	0.82	0				0
15 other parties	4,500	4.07	0	3,963	3.58	0	0
Total	110,501	100.00	39	110,704	100.00	38	77
Valid votes	110,501	98.39		110,704	98.57		
Invalid/blank votes	1,806	1.61		1,606	1.43		
Total votes	112,307	100.00		112,310	100.00		
Registered voters/turnout	202,233	55.53		202,233	55.53		

== Management ==
As of 2021 the municipality's debt with Eskom was in excess of R361 million, but it was honoring its payments in terms of their signed agreement.

== See also ==
- List of South African municipalities
