= Sedibeng District Municipality =

Sedibeng
- District municipality
- Seal

- Location in Gauteng
- Coordinates: 26°30′S 28°15′E
- Country: South Africa
- Province: Gauteng
- Seat: Vereeniging
- Local municipalities: List: Emfuleni; Midvaal; Lesedi

Government
  - Type: Municipal council
  - Mayor: Busisiwe Modisakeng

Area
  - Total: 4,173 km^{2} (1,611 sq mi)

Population (2021)
  - Total: 1,039,908
  - Density: 249.2/km^{2} (645.4/sq mi)

Racial makeup (2021)
  - Black African: 81%
  - Coloured: 1%
  - Indian/Asian: 1%
  - White: 17%

First languages (2021)
  - Sotho: 46.7%
  - Zulu: 16.0%
  - Afrikaans: 15.2%
  - Xhosa: 7.1%
  - Other: 15%
- Time zone: UTC+2 (SAST)
- Municipal code: DC42

The Sedibeng District Municipality (Sotho: Masepala wa Setereke wa Sedibeng; Zulu: UMasipala wesiFunda sase Sedibeng; Afrikaans: Sedibeng-distriktsmunisipaliteit) is one of the districts of the Gauteng province of South Africa. The administrative seat of the district is Vereeniging. As of 2011, the most widely spoken language among its 794,605 inhabitants was Sesotho.

== Socioeconomic situation ==
The total population of Sedibeng accounts for only 9% of the total Gauteng population of 8.84 million. This means that in 2001 Sedibengs's population was approximately 794 600 (Stats SA, 2001 CENSUS). The growth rate for Gauteng was 3.75% p.a and 2% p.a for Sedibeng during 2003 (Stats SA). In terms of the economy the district is dominated by manufacturing, which contributed roughly 32% to the local economy during 2001. Manufacturing in the district is dominated by the fabricated metal and the chemical sectors (Mittal Steel Company (previously ISCOR) and Sasol. The local economy has been stagnating for a number of years, with a net loss in formal job opportunities. Economic sectors which do present opportunities for further local development and economic growth include agriculture and tourism.

== Environmental ==
Some of Sedibeng's natural resources are:

- The Vaal River. At times however, the river is polluted by untreated sewage from this municipality.
- Vaal Dam, a tourist attraction and source of water even beyond the boundaries of Sedibeng
- Suikerbosrand Nature Reserve, a protected area in the Suikerbosrand Range
- Aquifers, which are an important source of water in rural areas

== Corruption ==
In 2020 the Department of Cooperative Governance (DCoG) decided to act against council members who in 2018 approved a large raise in salary for their municipal manager Stanley Khanyile. In 2020 Khanyile was shot and killed in Meyersdal, Alberton, before he could appear on charges of fraud, theft and money laundering stemming from his term as the head of a department in the Eastern Cape.

In March 2024, facing a financial crisis, the council increased its capital budget by R700,000 to purchase a luxury car for the mayor, Lerato Maloka.

== Local municipalities ==
Sedibeng District Municipality consists of the three local municipalities, namely Lesedi, Midvaal and Emfuleni. The total number of households in Sedibeng is estimated at 224 307.

Local municipality	Seat	Area (km²)	Population	Pop. %	Dominant language
Emfuleni	Vanderbijlpark	1 276 (27.6%)	658 425	82.86%	Sotho
Lesedi	Heidelberg	1 042 (22.5%)	71 531	9.00%	Zulu
Midvaal	Meyerton	2 312 (49.9%)	64 641	8.13%	Afrikaans

== Demographics ==
The following statistics are from the 2001 census.

Language	Population	%
Sotho	386 696	48.67%
Zulu	132 903	16.73%
Afrikaans	119 109	14.99%
Xhosa	69 049	8.69%
English	30 283	3.81%
Tswana	21 635	2.72%
Northern Sotho	12 696	1.60%
Tsonga	7 749	0.98%
Swati	4 358	0.55%
Ndebele	3 837	0.48%
Other	3 684	0.46%
Venda	2 598	0.33%

=== Gender ===
Gender	Population	%
Female	402 976	50.71%
Male	391 629	49.29%

P = B + A (STB) * 22.4% (Brummeria Rennaissance Case)

=== Ethnic group ===
Ethnic group	Population	%
Black African	648 901	81.66%
White	130 407	16.41%
Coloured	8 492	1.07%
Indian/Asian	6 805	0.86%

=== Age ===
Age	Population	%
000 - 004	64 639	8.13%
005 - 009	67 839	8.54%
010 - 014	72 225	9.09%
015 - 019	77 832	9.80%
020 - 024	84 539	10.64%
025 - 029	80 393	10.12%
030 - 034	67 418	8.48%
035 - 039	63 775	8.03%
040 - 044	56 839	7.15%
045 - 049	46 079	5.80%
050 - 054	34 982	4.40%
055 - 059	24 848	3.13%
060 - 064	19 325	2.43%
065 - 069	13 337	1.68%
070 - 074	9 130	1.15%
075 - 079	5 374	0.68%
080 - 084	3 876	0.49%
085 - 089	1 305	0.16%
090 - 094	542	0.07%
095 - 099	218	0.03%
100 plus	90	0.01%

=== Neighbours ===
Sedibeng is surrounded by:

- Johannesburg to the north
- Ekurhuleni (East Rand) to the north
- Nkangala in Mpumalanga to the north-east (DC31)
- Gert Sibande in Mpumalanga to the east (DC30)
- Fezile Dabi to the south (DC20)
- Dr Kenneth Kaunda in North West to the west (DC40)
- West Rand to the north-west (CBDC8)
