= Rand West City Local Municipality =

Rand West City
- Local municipality
- Seal

- Location of Rand West City Local Municipality within Gauteng
- Country: South Africa
- Province: Gauteng
- District: West Rand
- Seat: Randfontein
- Boroughs: 35

Government
  - Type: Municipal council

Area
  - Total: 1,115 km^{2} (431 sq mi)

Population (2011)
  - Total: 261,053
  - Density: 234.1/km^{2} (606.4/sq mi)
- Time zone: UTC+2 (SAST)
- Municipal code: GT485

Rand West City Municipality (Tswana: Mmasepala wa Rand West City; Afrikaans: Rand West City Munisipaliteit; Xhosa: uMasipala wase Rand West City; Sotho: Masepala wa Rand West City) is a local municipality in the Gauteng province of South Africa. It was established after the August 2016 local elections by merging the Randfontein and Westonaria local municipalities. It is a division of the West Rand District Municipality.

== Politics ==
The municipal council consists of 69 members elected by mixed-member proportional representation. 35 councillors are elected by first-past-the-post voting in 35 wards, while the remaining 34 are chosen from party lists so that the total number of party representatives is proportional to the number of votes received.

In the election of 4 November 2026, no party won a majority. The African National Congress (ANC) won the largest number of seats on the council.

The following table shows the results of the election.

Party	Ward			List			Total seats
Party	Votes	%	Seats	Votes	%	Seats	Total seats
African National Congress	23,795	32.99	24	23,529	32.65	0	24
Democratic Alliance	17,288	23.97	10	17,167	23.82	6	16
Economic Freedom Fighters	6,439	8.93	0	6,471	8.98	6	6
uMkhonto weSizwe Party	6,269	8.69	0	5,958	8.27	6	6
ActionSA	4,545	6.30	0	5,292	7.34	5	5
Freedom Front Plus	3,028	4.20	0	3,325	4.61	3	3
South African Communist Party	2,756	3.82	1	2,847	3.95	2	3
Patriotic Alliance	2,309	3.20	0	2,256	3.13	2	2
Azanian People's Organisation	788	1.09	0	822	1.14	1	1
African Christian Democratic Party	629	0.87	0	530	0.74	1	1
African Transformation Movement	479	0.66	0	634	0.88	1	1
Rand West Peoples Party	528	0.73	0	551	0.76	1	1
Independent candidates	574	0.80	0				0
16 other parties	2,702	3.75	0	2,689	3.73	0	0
Total	72,129	100.00	35	72,071	100.00	34	69
Valid votes	72,129	98.09		72,071	98.20		
Invalid/blank votes	1,408	1.91		1,323	1.80		
Total votes	73,537	100.00		73,394	100.00		
Registered voters/turnout	142,004	51.79		142,004	51.68		

== Management ==
The power utility Eskom has identified Rand West as a municipality with a poor payment record. In 2021 it owed Eskom over R510 million.
