= Krugersdorp =

City in Gauteng, South Africa

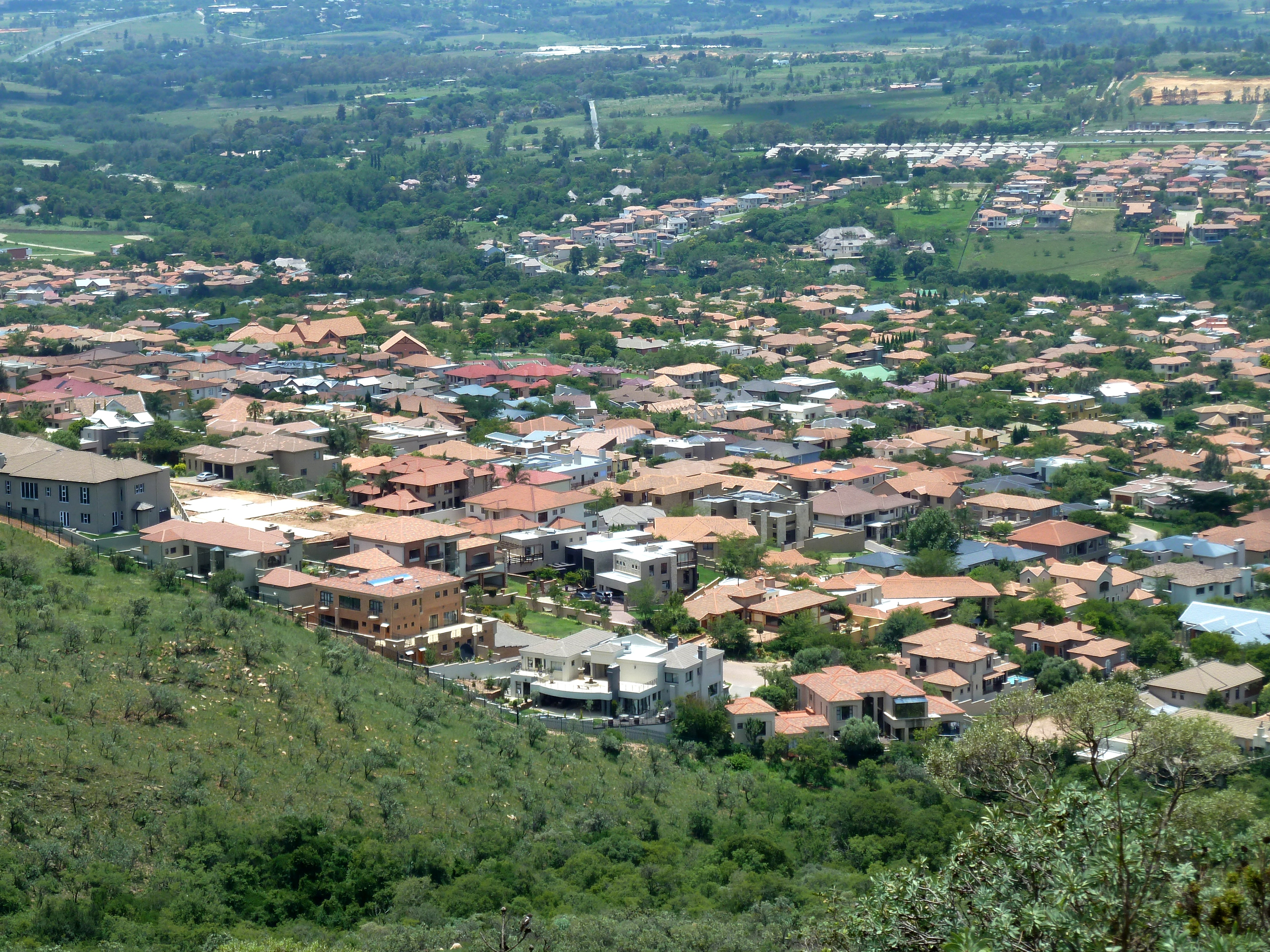
- Featherbrooke estate in Krugersdorp

- Location within Gauteng Location within South Africa Location within Africa
- Coordinates: 26°6′S 27°46′E
- Country: South Africa
- Province: Gauteng
- District: West Rand
- Municipality: Mogale City
- Established: 1887

Area
  - Total: 247.22 km^{2} (95.45 sq mi)
- Elevation: 1,724 m (5,656 ft)

Population (2011)
  - Total: 140,643
  - Density: 568.90/km^{2} (1,473.4/sq mi)

Racial makeup (2011)
  - Black African: 42.3%
  - Coloured: 1.4%
  - Indian/Asian: 5.4%
  - White: 50.2%
  - Other: 0.8%

First languages (2011)
  - Afrikaans: 42.0%
  - English: 19.5%
  - Tswana: 14.5%
  - Zulu: 4.8%
  - Other: 19.2%
- Time zone: UTC+2 (SAST)
- Postal code (street): 1739
- PO box: 1739
- Area code: 011

Krugersdorp (Afrikaans for 'Kruger's Town') is a mining city in the West Rand, Gauteng Province, South Africa founded in 1887 by Marthinus Pretorius and Abner Cohen. Following the discovery of gold on the Witwatersrand, a need arose for a major town in the west of the reef. The government bought part of the Paardekraal farm and named the new town after the Transvaal president, Paul Kruger. Krugersdorp no longer has a separate municipal government after it was integrated into Mogale City Local Municipality along with surrounding towns. It is now the seat of government for Mogale City.

== History ==
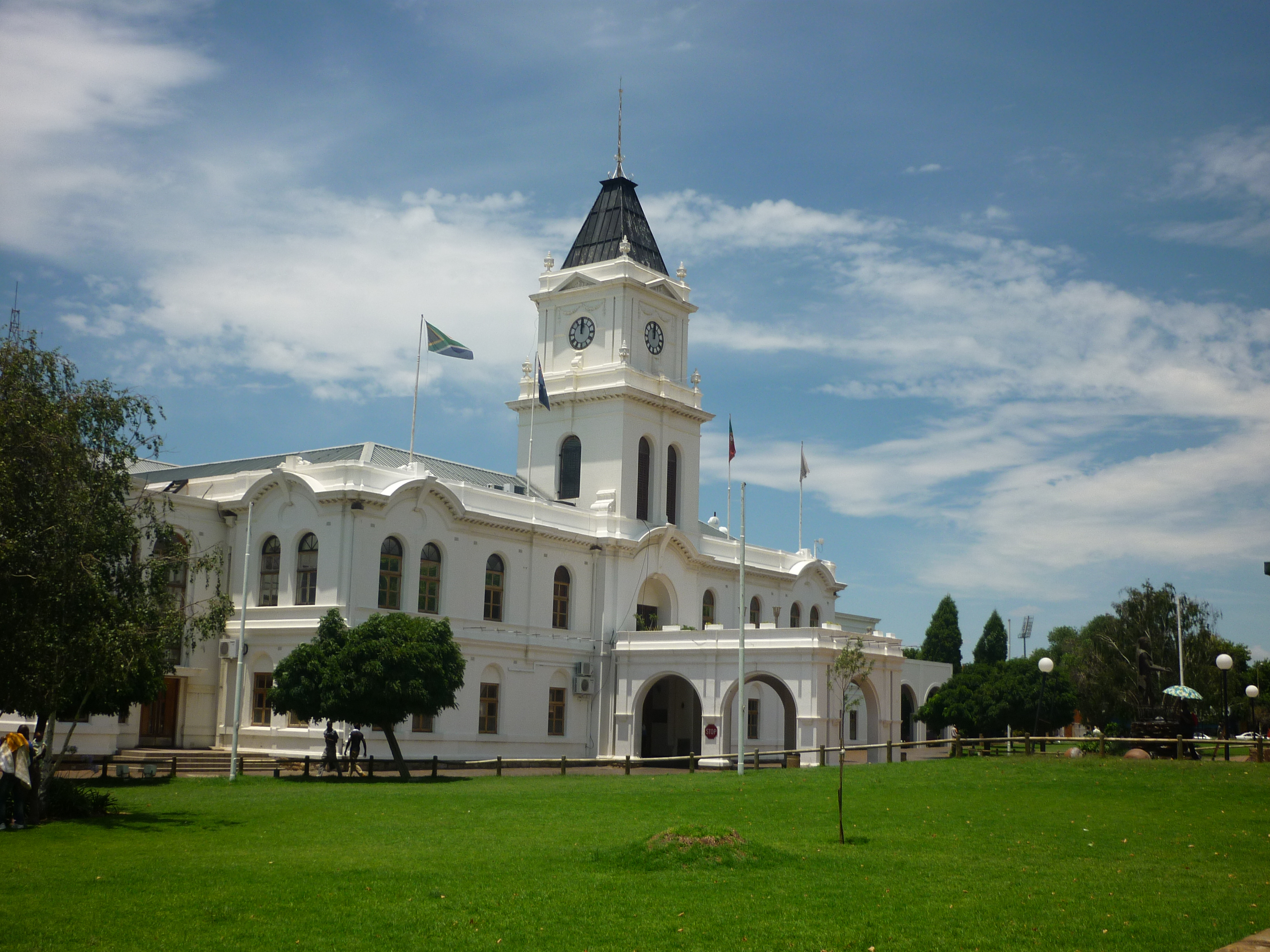
Town Hall in Krugersdorp

Krugersdorp is the site of a December 1880 gathering at which more than 6,000 men vowed to fight for the Transvaal's independence. Founded in 1887 by Marthinus Pretorius after the discovery of gold on his farm, Paardekraal, thereafter the mining industry played an important role in the development of the city. Two important events in the history of South Africa: the Transvaal War of Independence (1881) and the discovery of the Witwatersrand Goldfields (1886) took place in Krugersdorp. These events had far-reaching political and economic consequences for the country's development.

In April 1887, the South African Republic's (ZAR) Executive Council purchased part of the farm Paarderkraal to build a town called Krugersdorp. By the time the town was founded, the existence of the gold reef along the Witwatersrand had become common knowledge, and thousands seeking their fortunes pitched their tents and pegged claims. In 1888, Krugersdorp was proclaimed a separate gold field. By 1895, the proclaimed goldfields was separated from Krugersdorp, and the town and Distriksdorp, near the monument, were merged in April that year. By 1903, Krugersdorp became a municipality.

During the Second Boer War (1899–1902), the British built concentration camps in the valley that is now occupied by the Centenary Dam. A camp was overlooked by the "D" Shaft of the Luipardsvlei Estate Gold Mining Company, which was shut down in 1929 when mining shifted to deeper ore bodies that offered the prospect of larger tonnages. As of 2014 this shaft is being brought back into production. Part of the heritage of the area will feature in a museum to be built post-closure. An essential part of the museum's content will be the Boer War legacy.

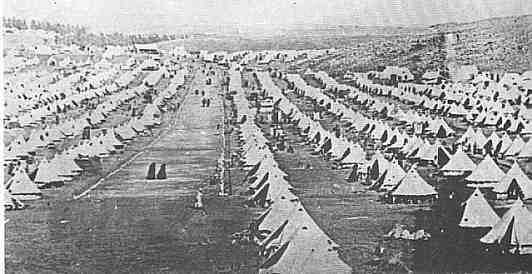
The British concentration camp for Boers at Krugersdorp.

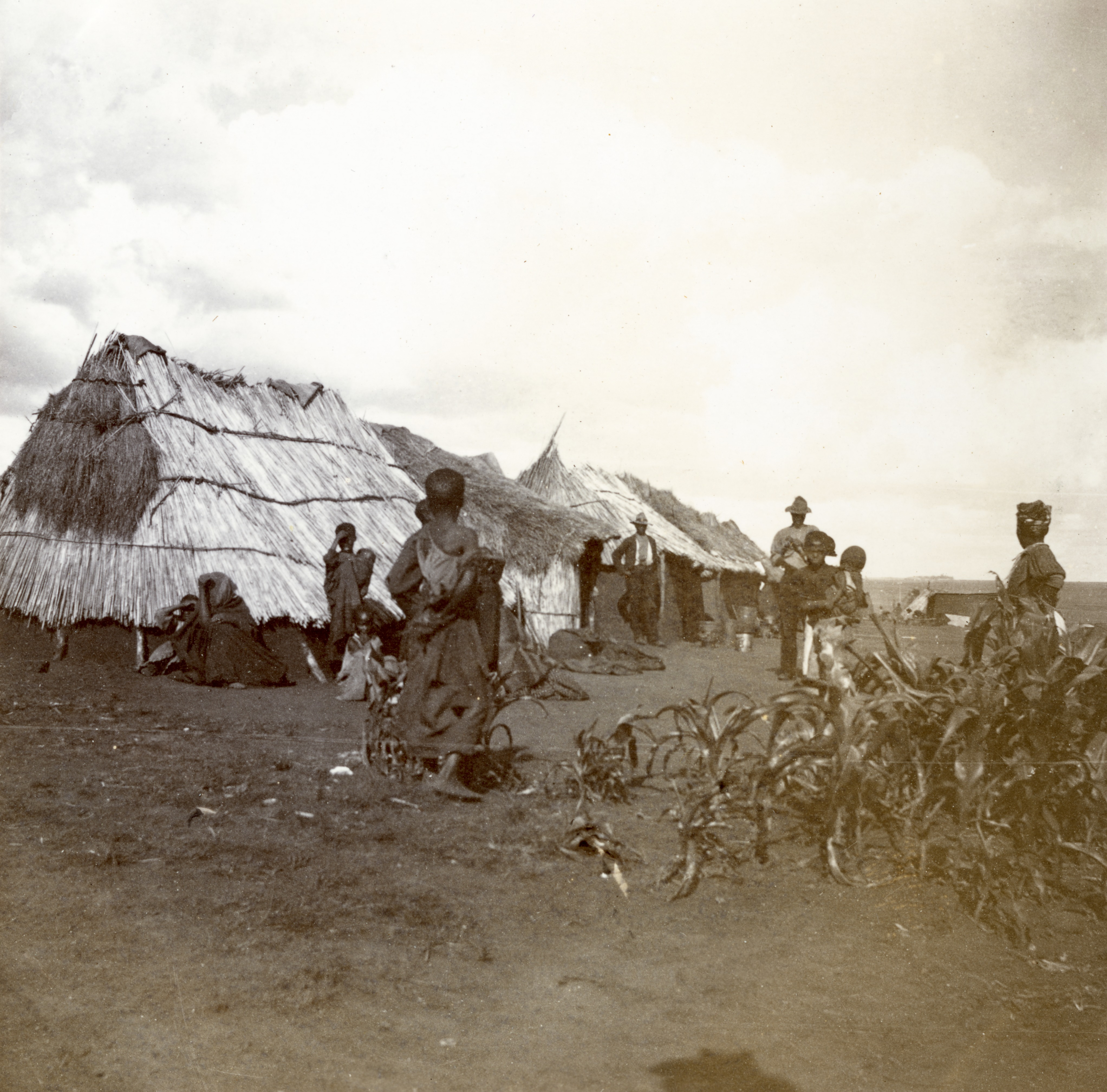
The camp for Blacks, c.1901

In 1952, the West Rand Consolidated Mine was the first in the world to extract uranium as a byproduct of the gold refining process.

== Demographics ==
Krugersdorp is home to the South African Branch of Jehovah's Witnesses, The Watchtower Bible, and Tract Society.

In 2010, the town's Coronation Park area received international exposure for the depiction of Afrikaner poverty by Finbarr O'Reilly. In 2014, the area was exposed again as a subject of the BBC documentary Reggie Yates' Extreme South Africa: White Slums.

== Economy ==
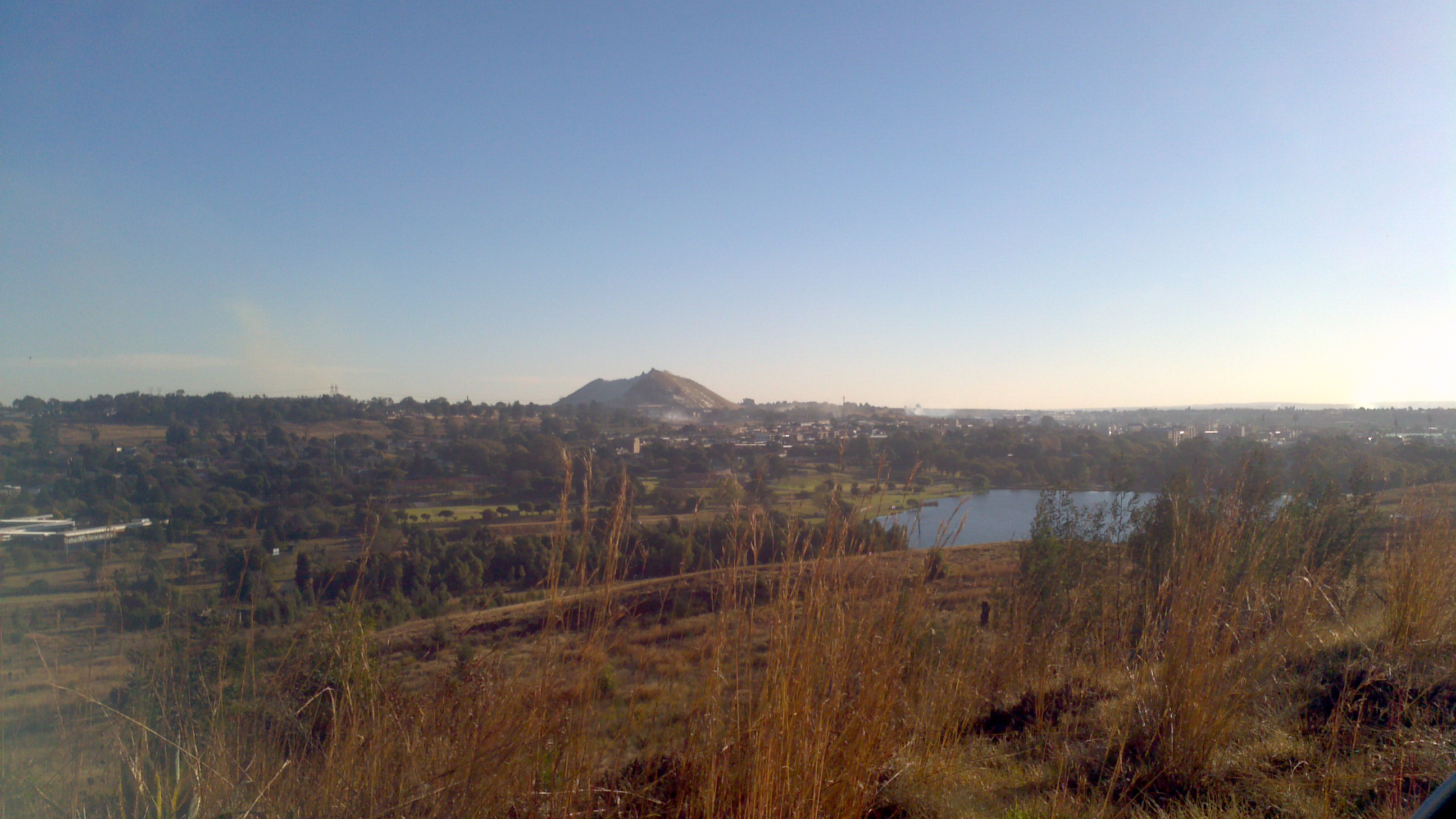
A view from Coronation Park overlooking the old town with the West Rand Consolidated Mines dump on the horizon

Gold, manganese, iron, asbestos and lime are all mined in the area.

Krugersdorp has a modern business centre and shopping malls alongside many smaller shops, schools, and necessary amenities. There are also game reserves and a nearby bird sanctuary.

Krugersdorp is served by the Jack Taylor Airfield north-west of the town centre (adjacent to the game reserve) and Lanseria International Airport 28 kilometres to the north-east. O. R. Tambo International Airport is 50 kilometres to the east.

The nearby 1,400 hectares (3,500 acres) Krugersdorp Game Reserve in the dense bush of the veld holds a large quantity of game and is one of the city's major tourist attractions. Also in close proximity are various provincial heritage sites including the Cradle of Humankind and its Sterkfontein Caves and the Wonder Cave.

== Law and government ==
=== Government ===
==== Name change ====
Although the city's municipality changed its name from Krugersdorp to Mogale City, the assumption that the city's name has been officially changed to Mogale City has been refuted by the Mogale City Municipality.

==== Coat of arms ====
Krugersdorp was proclaimed a municipality in 1903. By 1931, the municipal council had assumed a pseudo-heraldic coat of arms. The shield was divided by a horizontal line, the upper half subdivided by a vertical line, the three sections depicting (1) the Paardekraal monument, (2) a mining landscape, and (3) a plough. The motto was Labor omnia vincit improbus.

A proper coat of arms was designed in the 1960s. It was registered with the Transvaal Provincial Administration in November 1965 and at the Bureau of Heraldry in January 1969. The arms were : Per chevron ploye Azure and Or, dexter two mine hammers in saltire and sinister a cogwheel all Or, and in base the Paardekraal Monument Gules. In layman's terms, the shield was divided by a curved chevron-shaped line into blue and gold, displaying two crossed mine hammers and a cogwheel at the top, and the Paardekraal monument at the bottom. The crest was three horses' heads issuing from a golden mural crown; the supporters were an eland and a gemsbok; and the motto was Labor omnia vincit improbus.

== Attractions ==
Krugersdorp has tourist attractions such as Krugersdorp Game Reserve, Maropeng Visitor Centre, Walter Sisulu Botanical Gardens and Sterkfonten Caves.

The town is the host of the annual Gauteng Beach Party held at Coronation Park. Over the years, the event featured performances from artists including:

- DJ Sbu
- DJ Cleo
- Winnie Khumalo
- TBo Touch
- TKZee
- Brown Dash

Afro-pop music group Mafikizolo and singer Ntando Bangani are among some acts that originated from Krugersdorp.

== Sports ==
Krugersdorp has an 18-hole golf course and many facilities for extreme sports.

== Infrastructure ==
=== Health ===
==== Local clinics ====
- Central Clinic
- Kagiso Clinic B
- Azaadville Clinic
- Munsieville Clinic A
- Dr Kaka Clinic

==== Provincial hospitals ====
- Dr Yusuf Dadoo Hospital (Paardekraal)
- Sterkfontein Hospital
- Leratong Hospital

==== Private hospitals ====
- Krugersdorp Private Hospital
- Bell Street Day Hospital
- Netcare Pinehaven Hospital
- Medi-Cross Clinic

== Education ==
The schools in Krugersdorp include:

- Alma Mater International School
- Krugersdorp High School
- Town View High School
- Thuto-Lefa Secondary School
- Hoërskool Monument
- Hoërskool Jan De Klerk
- HTS Nic Diederichs
- St Ursula's School
- Hoërskool Noordheuwel
- Hoërskool Bastion
- Laerskool Muldersdrif
- Laerskool Kenmare
- Rant en Dal School for learners with Autism and SID
- Hoërskool Pro-Practicum
- Laerskool Millennium
- Laerskool Ebenhaeser
- Curro Krugersdorp Private School
- Laerskool Paardekraal
- Monument Primary School
- Laerskool Krugersdorp Noord
- Ahmed Timol Secondary School
- Azaadville Muslim School
- Silverfields Primary School
- Tina Cowley Reading Centre Krugersdorp

== Notable people ==
- Brad Binder
- Trevor Blokdyk
- Yusuf Dadoo
- Johannes de Klerk
- Hanno Dirksen
- Jaque Fourie
- Costa Gazi
- Allan Heyl
- Mmusi Maimane
- Nomvula Mokonyane
- Scott Spedding
- Lucien van der Walt
- Cindy Swanepoel
- Rayno Nel

== See also ==
- Krugersdorp Nature Reserve
- Devilsdorp
