= Local municipality (South Africa) =

Third level government structure in South Africa

In South Africa, a local municipality (Tswana: mmasepalaselegae; Sotho: masepala wa lehae; Northern Sotho: mmasepala wa selegae; Afrikaans: plaaslike munisipaliteit; Zulu: umasipala wendawo; Southern Ndebele: umasipaladi wendawo; Xhosa: umasipala wengingqi; Swazi: masipaladi wasekhaya; Venda: masipalawapo; Tsonga: masipala wa muganga) or Category B municipality is a type of municipality that serves as the third, and most local, tier of local government. Each district municipality is divided into a number of local municipalities, and responsibility for municipal affairs is divided between the district and local municipalities. There are 205 local municipalities in South Africa.

A local municipality may include rural areas as well as one or more towns or small cities. In larger urban areas there are no district or local municipalities, and a metropolitan municipality is responsible for all municipal affairs.

== Governance ==
A local municipality is governed by a municipal council elected by voters resident in the municipality on the basis of mixed-member proportional representation. The municipal area is divided into wards, the number of which depends on the population of the municipality. At local elections the voters have three ballot papers: one to vote for a candidate for ward councillor, one to vote for a party for the council of the local municipality, and one to vote for a party for the council of the district municipality. The ward councillors are directly elected by first-past-the-post voting. An equal number of PR (proportional representation) councillors are chosen from party lists in such a way that the total representation of each party on the council (including ward councillors) is proportional to the share of the vote that that party received.

There are three different systems by which the executive government of the municipality may be structured. In the plenary system, executive powers are vested in the full council, and the mayor is chairperson of the council. In the collective system, executive powers are vested in an executive committee elected by the council. In this system, the members of the executive committee are drawn from all parties in proportion to their representation on the council, and the mayor is chairperson of the executive committee. In the mayoral system, executive powers are vested in a mayor elected by the council. Mayors may delegate particular responsibilities to an appointed committee.

The Constitution defines the areas and topics for which municipal governments are responsible. National legislation divides this responsibility between the district municipalities and the local municipalities.

== Classification ==
Classification of local municipalities. A (metros) B1 (secondary cities) B2 (large towns) B3 (small towns) B4 (mostly rural)

For analytical and statistical purposes, local municipalities are classified into four categories:

Class	Description	Number (2022)
B1	Secondary cities, local municipalities with the largest budgets.	19
B2	Local municipalities with a large town as core.	26
B3	Local municipalities with small towns, with a relatively small population and significant proportion of urban population but with no large town as core.	99
B4	Local municipalities that are mainly rural with communal tenure and with, at most, one or two small towns in their area.	61

== Census ==
For census and statistical purposes, local municipalities are divided into "Main Places". These generally correspond to towns, small cities, boroughs of large cities, villages or tribal areas also known as townships. Those areas that do not fall within any of the above are incorporated in a main place named for the municipality.

== See also ==
- List of municipalities in South Africa
