= West Rand District Municipality =

West Rand
- District municipality
- Seal

- Location in Gauteng
- Coordinates: 26°15′S 27°30′E
- Country: South Africa
- Province: Gauteng
- Seat: Randfontein
- Local municipalities: List: Mogale City; Rand West City; Merafong City

Government
  - Type: Municipal council
  - Mayor: Thabiso Bovungana (AIC)

Area
  - Total: 4,087 km^{2} (1,578 sq mi)

Population (2011)
  - Total: 820,995
  - Density: 200.9/km^{2} (520.3/sq mi)

Racial makeup (2011)
  - Black African: 79.2%
  - Coloured: 2.5%
  - Indian/Asian: 1.1%
  - White: 16.7%

First languages (2011)
  - Tswana: 27.3%
  - Afrikaans: 16.9%
  - Xhosa: 14.9%
  - Sotho: 10.8%
  - Other: 30.1%
- Time zone: UTC+2 (SAST)
- Municipal code: DC48

The West Rand District Municipality (Tswana: Mmasepala wa Sedika wa West Rand; Afrikaans: Wesrand-distriksmunisipaliteit; Xhosa: uMasipala weSithili sase West Rand; Sotho: Masepala wa Setereke wa West Rand) is one of the districts of the Gauteng province of South Africa, that covers the West Rand area, with the exception of Roodepoort. The seat of the district municipality is Randfontein. As of 2011, the most spoken language among its population of 820,995 is Tswana. The district code is CBDC8.

== Geography ==
=== Neighbours ===
West Rand is surrounded by:

- Bojanala Platinum (DC37) to the north
- Tshwane (Pretoria) to the north-east
- Johannesburg to the east
- Sedibeng (DC42) to the south-east
- Dr Kenneth Kaunda (DC40) to the south-west

=== Local municipalities ===
The district contains the following local municipalities:

Name	Code	Seat	Area (km²)	Population (2016)	Pop. density (per km²)
Merafong City	GT484	Carletonville	1,631	188,843	115.8
Mogale City	GT481	Krugersdorp	1,342	383,864	286.0
Rand West City	GT485	Randfontein	1,115	265,887	238.5

== Demographics ==
The following statistics are from the 2011 census.

Language	Population	%
Tswana	215 507	24.96%
Afrikaans	126 338	16.98%
Xhosa	123 501	16.60%
Sotho	86 236	11.59%
Zulu	63 541	8.54%
Tsonga	38 410	5.16%
English	35 811	4.81%
Northern Sotho	22 618	3.04%
Other	10 587	1.42%
Swati	9 918	1.33%
Venda	8 927	1.20%
Ndebele	2 759	0.37%

=== Gender ===
Gender	Population	%
Male	400 157	53.77%
Female	344 011	46.23%

=== Ethnic group ===
Ethnic group	Population	%
Black African	587 665	78.84%
White	132 849	17.85%
Coloured	17 531	2.36%
Indian/Asian	7 123	0.96%

=== Age ===
Age	Population	%
000 - 004	63 062	8.47%
005 - 009	55 983	7.52%
010 - 014	55 746	7.49%
015 - 019	58 721	7.89%
020 - 024	72 868	9.79%
025 - 029	82 601	11.10%
030 - 034	77 616	10.43%
035 - 039	76 425	10.27%
040 - 044	65 412	8.79%
045 - 049	46 479	6.25%
050 - 054	31 153	4.19%
055 - 059	19 826	2.66%
060 - 064	14 459	1.94%
065 - 069	9 058	1.22%
070 - 074	6 526	0.88%
075 - 079	4 177	0.56%
080 - 084	2 561	0.34%
085 - 089	897	0.12%
090 - 094	395	0.05%
095 - 099	130	0.02%
100 plus	73	0.01%

== Politics ==
=== Election results ===
Election results for the West Rand District Municipality in the 2021 South African municipal elections.

Party	Votes	%
African National Congress	79 559	43.82%
Democratic Alliance	48 337	26.62%
Economic Freedom Fighters	28 508	15.70%
Freedom Front Plus	11 749	6.47%
African Independent Congress	2 779	1.53%
Patriotic Alliance	1 978	1.09%
African Christian Democratic Party	1 693	0.93%
African Transformation Movement	1 178	0.65%
Pan Africanist Congress of Azania	1 134	0.62%
United Democratic Movement	1 017	0.56%
Congress Of The People	950	0.52%
Randfontein Peoples Party	854	0.47%
Forum 4 Service Delivery	653	0.36%
National Freedom Party	415	0.23%
Activists Movement of South Africa	339	0.19%
Justice And Employment Party	318	0.18%
African Covenant	114	0.06%
Total	181 575	100.00%
