= St. Michael's School, Bloemfontein =

St Michael's School For Girls
- SMS

Location
- Bloemfontein, Free State; South Africa; 29°06′13″S 26°12′02″E

Information
- Type: All-Girls Semi-Private School
- Motto: Ante Deum Asto; I Stand Before God
- Established: 1874
- Founder: Bishop Webb
- Headmaster: Mrs. Noèline Stumpfe
- Head teacher: Mr. Adam Erasmus
- Chaplain: Rev. Grant Trewern
- Grades: 00–12
- Colours: Navy blue, gold and white
- Boarding Houses: Community House, Hildegarde House
- School Houses: Athlone, Buxton, Clarendon, Connaught
- Affiliation: Anglican Church of Southern Africa
- Website: www.stms.co.za

St. Michael's School, established in 1874 by the Community of St Michael and All Angels, is a public school with a boarding option for girls located in Bloemfontein, Free State, South Africa. It is the third oldest girls school in South Africa. Its brother school is St. Andrew's School, which is located nearby in the suburb of Westdene. Originally a private school, St. Michael's later become a government-aided school, but still retains its Anglican foundation. The current principal is Mrs. Noèline Stumpfe.

== History ==
St Michael's is the oldest girls' school North of the Orange River. It was founded by Bishop Webb in 1874, and in the same year, the first Mother Superior, Sister Emma, and five volunteers arrived in Bloemfontein to become the Community of Saint Michael and All Angels. Henrietta Stockdale, who became a famous member of the nursing fraternity in this country, was among these. Her statue stands in the grounds of St Cyprian's Cathedral in Kimberley. The school was originally built on the western boundary of Bloemfontein, where the Sand du Plessis Theatre now stands, in Markgraaff Street.

The school moved to its present site in Brandwag in 1970. The foundation stone was laid by Bishop Frederick Amoore. Many precious relics were also transferred and can be seen in the archives, in the chapel and in and around the school complex. In 1975, the Rev. Mother Mary Ruth and the sisters retired from their administrative, academic and hostel duties in the school. Currently, governance is vested in the school parent community represented by an elected board of governors as a school governing body.

St Michael's has an Anglican tradition with an Anglican chaplain and a chapel where worship services are conducted regularly. The bishop of the Diocese of the Free State is also the school visitor and serves on the school board of governors.

== Notable alumni ==
- Anne Cleaver (South Africa's first female doctor)
- Annie Botha (wife of Louis Botha)
- Shirndré-Lee Simmons (birth 2000), South African field hockey player
