= George Mitchell (priest) =

The Revd George Mitchell was a missionary priest of the Anglican Church serving in the Free State, South Africa, from 1864, and afterwards at Kimberley, who pioneered early translation of liturgical Epistles and Gospels and portions of the Book of Common Prayer into Setswana. He was born near Mintford in England in 1835 and died in Kimberley, South Africa.

== Education and missionary intention ==
Mitchell attended St Augustine's College in Canterbury, where he became acquainted with fellow student Samuel Moroka, son of the Barolong ruler of Thaba 'Nchu, South Africa. He determined to take up missionary work at Thaba 'Nchu and accompanied Moroka to South Africa, arriving at Bloemfontein in November 1864.

== Career in South Africa ==
Mitchell became part of the burgeoning first generation of Anglican church workers to join the new Diocese of Bloemfontein, formed under its inaugural bishop, Edward Twells, in 1863. Within a month of his arrival, on 18 December 1864, Mitchell was ordained deacon, in Bloemfontein, and he took up residence at Thaba ‘Nchu on 10 May the following year.

=== Thaba 'Nchu Mission ===
Thaba 'Nchu was at the time the capital of an independent Barolong polity within the Free State, ruled by Kgosi (Chief) Moroka II (it was annexed to the Free State in 1884 following the death of Moroka’s adopted son and successor Tshipinare). In a report of June 1865 Twells recorded that Mitchell was “studying the language” (SeTswana) and “commencing the mission work”. Deacon Mitchell was recalled to Bloemfontein in 1867, to extend work there through the newly established St Patrick's mission.

Mitchell was ordained by Twells to the priesthood on Trinity Sunday 1869 - the first occasion of the ordering of a priest in the diocese – and was sent to assist Canon Beckett of the Brotherhood of St Augustine, who was at Thaba 'Nchu prior to the brotherhood's relocation to Modderpoort. For a time Mitchell ran the mission at Thaba 'Nchu unassisted.

The Revd William Crisp joined the mission at Thaba 'Nchu, where Mitchell continued until 1880 – save for a period when he visited England.

=== Kimberley and the founding of St Matthew's Barkly Road ===
In 1880 Mitchell was appointed to a new mission at Kimberley, then still part of the Diocese of Bloemfontein, where he served the mining compounds and co-founded the parish of St Matthew's, Barkly Road. He remained in Kimberley in his retirement and was still active as a priest in what was by then the Diocese of Kimberley and Kuruman in 1913.

St Matthew's was founded jointly by Mitchell and Canon W.H.R. Bevan. In 1882 Mitchell secured the land on which the church was to be built. It was erected in 1888 and dedicated by the Bishop of Bloemfontein on 2 June 1889.

== Translator ==
As he mastered the Serolong (Setswana) language, Mitchell prepared translations of the liturgical Epistles and Gospels and portions of the Book of Common Prayer. These were printed on the mission press at Thaba 'Nchu in 1875. They were “revised and greatly enlarged in their scope” by William Crisp.

== Notes and references ==
- Crisp, William (1895). Some account of the Diocese of Bloemfontein, in the Province of South Africa, from 1863 to 1894. Printed by J. Parker.
- Muss-Arnolt, William (1914). The Book of Common Prayer Among the Nations of the World: A History of Translations of the Prayer Book of the Church of England and of the Protestant Episcopal Church of America...a Study Based Mainly on the Collection of Josiah Henry Benton. London: Society for Promoting Christian Knowledge.
- Schoeman, Karel (1986). The Free State Mission: The Work of the Anglican Church in the Orange Free State, 1863-1883, as Described by Contemporaries. Cape Town: Human & Rousseau. ISBN 978-0-7981-1986-3.
