= Motheo FM =

South Africa
- Frequency: 88.5 FM

Links
- Website: www.motheofm.co.za

Motheo FM is a South African community radio station based in the Free State.

== Coverage areas ==
- Bloemfontein
- Botshabelo
- Brandfort
- Bultfontein
- Dewesdorp
- Glen
- Hobhouse
- Theunissen
- Windburg
- Verkeerevlei
- Ladybrand
- Thaba-Phathswa
- Hobhouse
- Wepener
- Excelsior
- Tweespruit
- Edenburg
- Jagersfontein
- Trompsburg
- Smithfield
- Boshof

== Broadcast languages ==
- English
- SeSotho
- Tswana
- Xhosa

== Broadcast time ==
- 24/7

== Target audience ==
- Whole community, primarily youth
- LSM Groups 1 - 7
- Age Group 10 - 42

== Programme format ==
- 40% Talk
- 60% Music

== Listenership Figures ==
Estimated Listenership
	7 Day
Jun 2013	272 000
May 2013	237 000
Feb 2013	254 000
Dec 2012	280 000
