= Stanley Haynes =

English-born Anglican bishop

Haynes, c. 1920s

Stanley John Haynes was an Anglican bishop in the early part of the 20th century in South Africa.

== Life ==
Haynes was the son of Ambrose T. Haynes of London. He entered the Kelham Hall house of the Society of the Sacred Mission (SSM) in 1901. He was a missionary priest at Thlotse (Hlotse) from 1908 to 1910. Towards the end of his time there, Sisters from the Community of St Michael and All Angels arrived. From 1911 to 1915 he was the SSM Provincial for Southern Africa, at Modderpoort. He became the assistant bishop in the Diocese of Bloemfontein, consecrated on 2 October 1923; Francis Balfour who had held the post from 1910 died in February 1924, in Ireland. His successor in 1940 or 1941 was Thomas William Stainton.

Haynes married Cecil Maude Agnes Currey, daughter of John Blades Currey, on 12 January 1926 in Rondebosch, Cape Town. The marriage service was conducted by William Carter, archbishop of Cape Town. The marriage entailed Haynes leaving the SSM.
