= William Crisp =

The Revd William Crisp was a missionary priest of the Anglican Church in the Diocese of Bloemfontein, South Africa, who served there from the mid-1860s. The Society for the Propagation of the Gospel described him as “the first and greatest apostle of the native races” in the central part of South Africa, who, it added, “had sympathy with the native point of view”. Crisp was born at Southwold, England, in 1842. He died in Cape Town in 1910.

== Career in South Africa ==
Having been ordained deacon in 1862, William Crisp went out to South Africa to work in the newly established Diocese of Bloemfontein. It was there that he was ordained priest in 1866.

=== Thaba 'Nchu and Bloemfontein ===
Crisp was stationed at Thaba 'Nchu, working alongside the Revd George Mitchell, in 1871–76; and he served there again in 1881-86 after Mitchell had gone on to Kimberley. Crisp was responsible for the Thaba 'Nchu mission's printing press, on which Mitchell's and his own translations of portions of the Book of Common Prayer and hymns were printed. Crisp had also prepared a Catechism and other works in Setswana. In 1871 Crisp had written to the newly arrived Bishop Webb that he and Mitchell were able to converse with the people and preach in the local Serolong dialect of Setswana.

By 1883 Crisp had been appointed by Webb as a canon of the cathedral in Bloemfontein, and treasurer of the Diocese; and afterwards he served as archdeacon.

=== Cape Town ===
Crisp went to Cape Town about 1900, where he was made a canon of the cathedral. As secretary of the diocese and treasurer of the Diocese of Cape Town and provincial board of trustees he served the Church of the Province of South Africa, until illness forced him to resign.

Crisp died in 1910.

== Translations and publications ==
Crisp had revised and expanded the liturgical translations produced by George Mitchell. In 1885, on the printing press at Thaba 'Nchu, he published his translation of the New Testament in the Serolong dialect of Setswana, Testamente e Ncha. Other works included his Notes towards a Secoana grammar (1880), an enlarged second edition of which was published by the Society for Promoting Christian Knowledge in 1886. A revised Setswana Book of Common Prayer, with Psalms, was published by Society for Promoting Christian Knowledge in 1887 – later to be still further revised by the Revd Charles Clulee and Bishop Henry Bousfield, in 1911.

In addition to his translation work, Crisp published a book, Some Account of the Diocese of Bloemfontein in the Province of South Africa from 1863 to 1894, published by James Parker in Oxford.
