= Henrietta Stockdale =

British nursing pioneer and Anglican religious sister

Sister Henrietta Stockdale CSM and AA
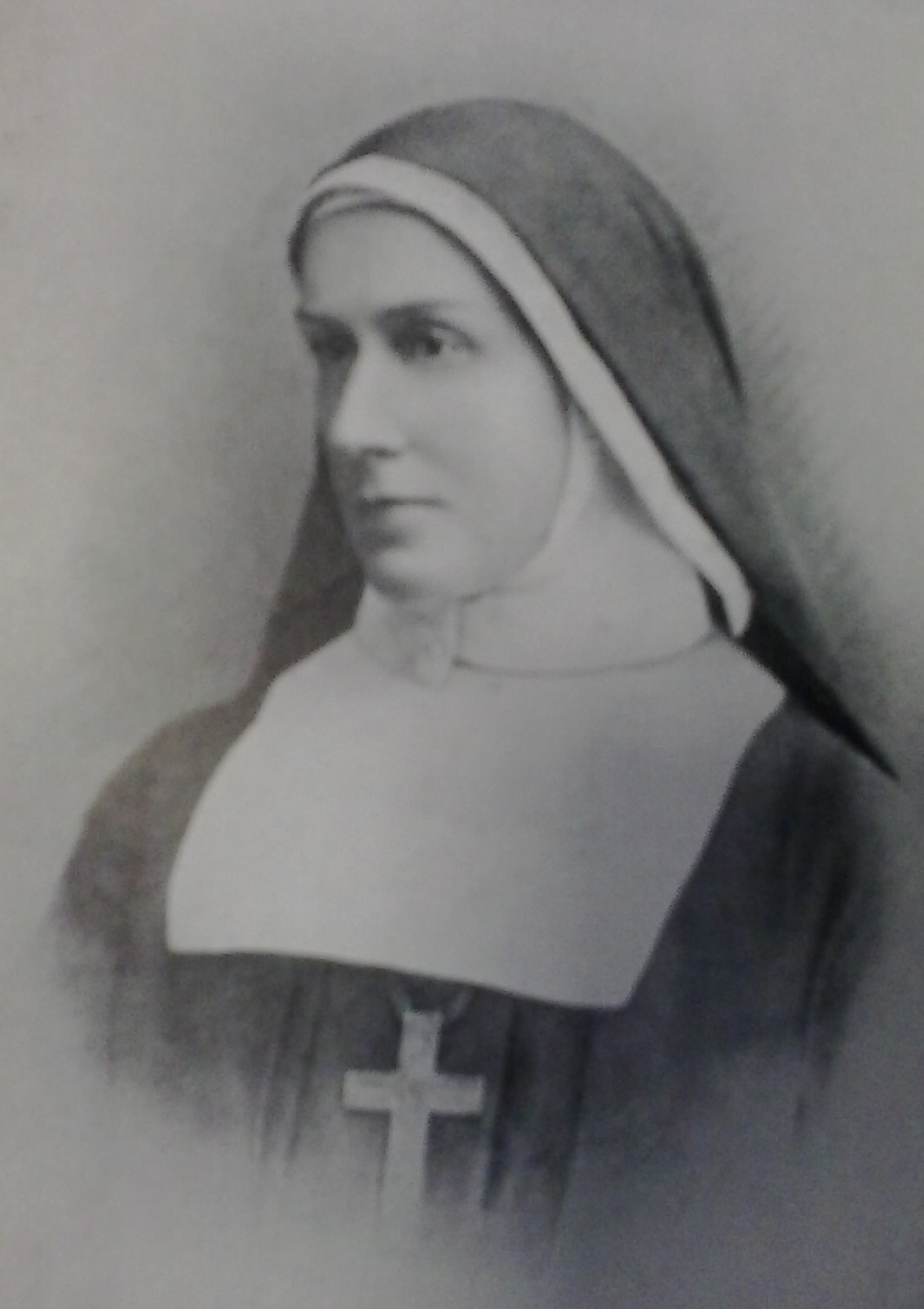

Personal life
- Born: 9 July 1847 Nottinghamshire, England
- Died: 6 October 1911 (aged 64) Kimberley, Northern Cape, Union of South Africa
- Known for: Improving nursing training in South Africa

Religious life
- Religion: Anglican
- Order: Community of St Michael and All Angels

Sister Henrietta, CSM and AA (9 July 1847 – 6 October 1911) was a British nursing pioneer and Anglican religious sister. Through her influence and pressure the first state registration of nurses and midwives in the world was brought about when the Cape of Good Hope Medical and Pharmacy Act of 1891 passed into law. She was a member of the Anglican Community of St Michael and All Angels.

== Early influences ==
Sister Henrietta was born on 9 July 1847 at Gringley on the Hill, Nottinghamshire, the eldest of five children of the Revd Henry Stockdale, the vicar of Misterton and later of Bole, and his wife Christine Anne Stockdale née Nicholson. She was confirmed by John Jackson, bishop of Lincoln on 22 March 1863, at Walkeringham. A few weeks previously Edward Twells, the newly consecrated bishop of the Orange River Mission (as the Bloemfontein Mission was then called), visited the Walkeringham Vicarage, where Mr. Stockdale, Henrietta and a cousin of hers met with him. The young Henrietta's missionary enthusiasm was fired by this meeting, and she and her cousin were both made Associates of the Bloemfontein Mission.

"From that time, when she was only fifteen, until her death nearly fifty years afterwards, she gave her prayers, her thoughts, her time, and finally herself to the Bloemfontein Mission, and died in its cause."

== Going to South Africa ==
In 1870 Bishop Allan Becher Webb was made Bishop of Bloemfontein, and before he went out he visited Bole to see Henrietta. A year later the Revd Mr Bevan from the Orange River Mission visited the family and was instrumental in having Herietta's brother go out to the mission at Modderpoort. She followed in due course, responding to a call by Webb for teachers and nurses. Miss Stockdale received some months' training as a nurse at the Clewer Hospital and at the Great Ormond Street Hospital for children. She sailed for South Africa, with other volunteers and in the company of Archdeacon and Mrs Croghan, on 6 March 1874, the same day on which she had, eleven years before, been made an Associate of the Orange River Mission. Landing at Port Elizabeth, the party travelled up to Bloemfontein, where they founded the Community of St Michael and All Angels. When Miss Stockdale was admitted to full membership of the order, about 1875, she took her vows and was henceforth known as Sister Henrietta.

== Kimberley and the establishment of Southern Africa's first training school for nurses ==
Sister Henrietta first went across to Kimberley in the winter of 1876, working as district nurse in the mining camps, and then at Kimberley's new Carnarvon Hospital. She returned to England to recover from typhoid contracted at this time, taking the opportunity to train further at London's University College Hospital. It was on her going back to Kimberley that she established Southern Africa's first training school for nurses at the Carnarvon Hospital. "Inspired and guided by her", wrote Dr Charlotte Searle, "Kimberley nurses moved out to wherever they were needed, establishing hospitals, starting nurses' training schools, and providing nursing care."

Sister Henrietta spent a year as Matron at the St George's Hospital in Bloemfontein (1877), but then returned to Kimberley. In 1880–1881, during the First Boer War, she took charge of the military hospital at Newcastle, Colony of Natal.

== State Registration of Nurses ==
Sister Henrietta registered with the British Trained Nurses' Association in 1890 (she held certificate No 15), and maintained contact with its founder, Mrs Bedford Fenwick, who was an early advocate of State registration of nurses. In South Africa Sister Henrietta persuaded influential figures, notably Dr William Guybon Atherstone of Grahamstown, to back legislation providing for registration of nurses and midwives. This was achieved through the Cape Colony's Medical and Pharmacy Act of 1891.

The Carnarvon and Diggers' Hospitals combined to become the Kimberley Hospital in 1892. Subsidised by the Cape Government, it was enlarged and attracted doctors such as Leander Starr Jameson and John Eddie Mackenzie, who took part in the training of nurses. The Community of St Michael and All Angels withdrew from Kimberley Hospital in 1895, whereafter Sister Henrietta established a maternity nursing home and nursing co-operative at St Michael's Home.

== Death ==
Sister Henrietta died in Kimberley on 6 October 1911, aged 64, and was buried at the Dutoitspan Cemetery.

== Commemoration ==
=== Windows, statues and grave site ===
A stained glass window at St Cyprian's Cathedral, installed in the nave soon after her death, was given in memory of Sr Henrietta. In 1970 a statue by Jack Penn, reputedly one of the only statues of a nun, was erected in the cathedral grounds and unveiled by Bishop Philip Wheeldon. A bust, based on the same statue, is situated in the north transept of the Anglican Cathedral in Bloemfontein, where the Community of St Michael and All Angels was founded.

In 1984 the remains of Sister Henrietta, and of two fellow workers also originally buried at Dutoitspan Cemetery, were reinterred at St Cyprian's Cathedral. The graves (with the later addition of the reinterred remains of Archdeacon Lawson) are within a commemorative garden, alongside the statue.

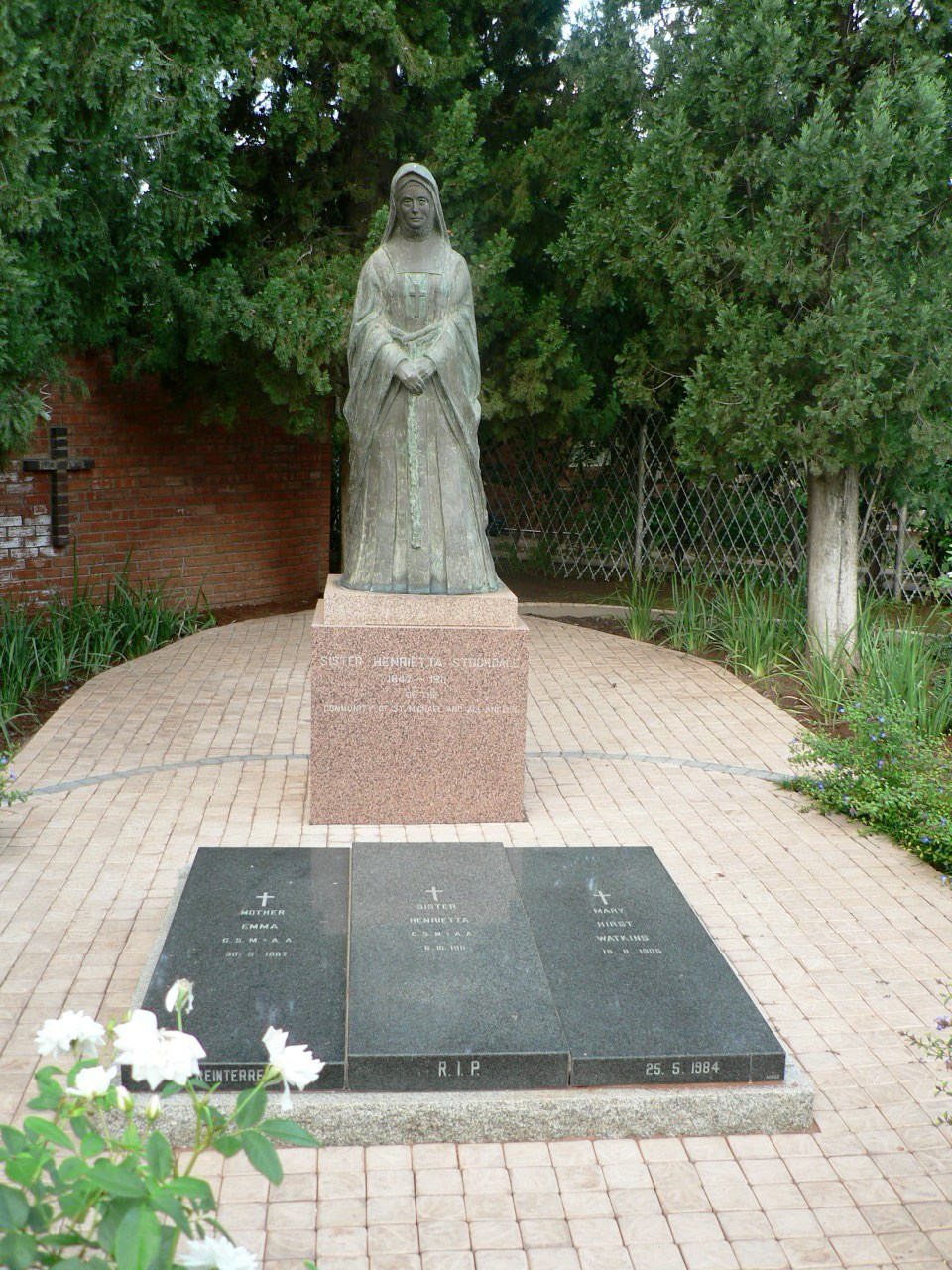
The grave of Sister Henrietta and her fellow workers at St Cyprian's Cathedral, Kimberley

=== Annual commemorations and centenary ===
Over a number of years, Sister Henriettta has come to be remembered annually in Kimberley. The St Cyprian's Guild at the cathedral, in association with the Historical Society of Kimberley and the Northern Cape, organised services led by cathedral clergy and choir at the Sister Henrietta Stockdale Chapel (at the hospital), on 6 October each year. The anniversary of her death is fixed in the calendar of saints of the Anglican Church of Southern Africa, which also provides a collect for Sister Henrietta CSM & AA.

The centenary of her death in 2011 was marked with a Health and Wellness Day on the lawns at St Cyprian's Cathedral and a Thanksgiving Mass in the cathedral at which Bishop Oswald Swartz presided and preached. In the spirit of Sister Henrietta's vision, and with links thus rekindled with health and medical services in the city, the cathedral promotes and co-ordinates this new pattern of commemoration through health screening, education and career guidance, combined with a symbolic element of thanksgiving and wreath-laying.

=== Institutions and awards ===
The Henrietta Stockdale Training College for nurses in Kimberley was named in recognition of this pioneer nurse who initiated training courses for nurses at Kimberley Hospital and was instrumental in obtaining state registration for nurses and midwives in the Cape Colony in 1891. It had been through her work that South Africa became the first country in the world to legally recognise nursing education, approve nursing schools and provide statutory curricula and examinations for nurses.

The South African Nursing Association established a prize, the Henrietta Stockdale Floating Trophy at the University of the Witwatersrand, which is awarded to students achieving the highest level of professional maturity during the four-year nursing degree at the university.

=== Sister Henrietta Stockdale Chapel ===
The Kimberley Hospital Chapel, built in her time at the hospital (with a dedication to St Michael), was declared a provincial heritage site in 1963 (now a Provincial Heritage Site) and is known as the "Sister Henrietta Stockdale Chapel".

In 1887 Sister Henrietta had proposed that the Sisterhood's existing oratory should be converted into four bedrooms, owing to the demand for extra wards as well as extra accommodation for nurses. She then sought public subscription and mining company support for the building of a new Chapel and purchase of an organ, plans being approved by 5 July 1887. By St Michael's Day, 29 September that same year, the new chapel had been completed and was furnished and ready for its dedication. Furnishings include stained glass windows depicting St Michael the Archangel, and the Angels Gabriel, Uriel and others. Initially the property of the Anglican Church, open for use by any denomination, it was deemed from 1947 to be property of the Kimberley Hospital. Memorial plaques within the chapel were erected in memory of nursing members and associates of the Community of St Michael and All Angels as well as nursing and medical staff of the Kimberley Hospital spanning the late nineteenth and twentieth centuries.

== Assessment ==
Dr Charlotte Searle has described Sister Henrietta as a "remarkable woman, who laid the foundation of professional nursing and modern hospital organisation in Southern Africa ... [she] was regarded as a saint by some, and as a keen business woman politician by others. She had a fearless approach to the political questions of the day, and never hesitated to enlist the aid of a Royal Princess when she felt that nursing and the care of the sick were threatened."

Assessing her impact after a hundred years, in October 2011, the Dean of Kimberley, the Very Revd Simon Aiken, said that "Sister Henrietta's legacy is the living, active, ongoing delivery of healthcare to ordinary people, most especially the marginalised who might not have access to such opportunities."
