= W.Z. Fenyang =

South African politician

Walton Zacharias Fenyang (W.Z. Fenyang) was a South African politician. He was a central figure of the political establishment of Thaba Nchu as an independent reserve in South Africa. He was one of the Barolong members of the Thaba Nchu board.

== Early life ==
Walton Zacharias Fenyang was the grandchild of the leader of the Barolong, Chief Tshipinare. Fenyang was educated in Healdtown. He later became chief of the Barolong subgroup of the Tswana people. Fenyang owned a farm at Rietfontein in the Thaba 'Nchu reserve. Fenyang had a close association with Sol Plaatje and was one of Ellen Kuzwayo's grandfathers’ friends who lived close to the farm from which Kuzwayo and her family were forcibly removed.

== Career ==
In 1913, Fenyang formed part of the African National Congress delegation which met with the Minister of Native Affairs to reject the proposed Land Act. He was an early treasurer of the ANC and he served as provincial ANC president in Orange Free State. Fenyang established a weekly newspaper from Bloemfontein called the Messenger Morumioa in the 1920s which circulated for two years in Orange Free State and northern Transvaal. Fenyang, J. Nyoong and Reverend J. Goronyane funded Tsala ea Becoana which was a political, non-partisan newspaper covering current affairs and opinion pieces. It was edited by Sol Plaatje.

== Legacy ==
The land on which the old Moroka Hospital building was built was donated by W.Z Fenyang and James Moroka. The hospital is a government hospital and serves the Thaba 'Nchu region.

== See also ==
- Tswana people
- Botshabelo
- Maria Moroka Nature Reserve
