= Annie Botha =

Prior First Lady of South Africa

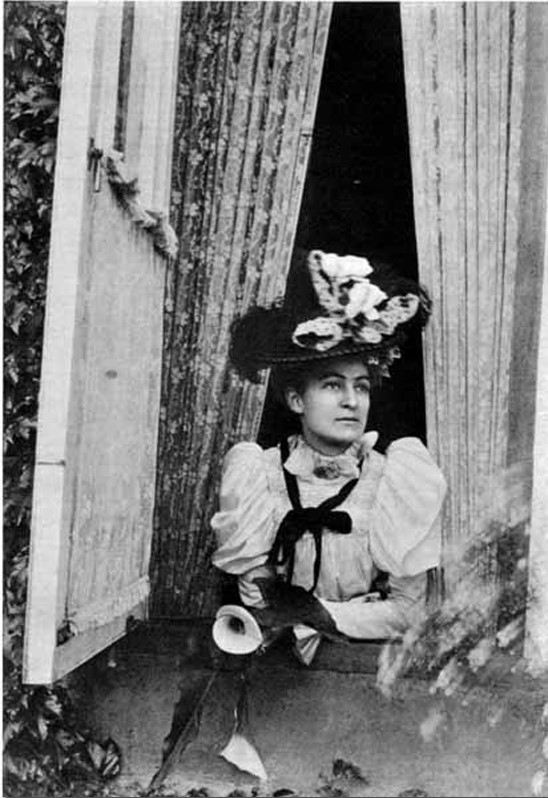
- Botha in 1900

Spouse of the Prime Minister of South Africa
- Assumed role 31 May 1910 – 27 August 1919
- Monarch: George V
- Governors-General: The Viscount Gladstone; The Earl Buxton
- Minister: Louis Botha
- Preceded by: Office established
- Succeeded by: Isie Krige

Spouse of the Prime Minister of the Transvaal
- Assumed role 4 March 1907 – 31 May 1910
- Monarchs: Edward VII; George V
- Governor: The Earl of Selborne
- Preceded by: Office established
- Succeeded by: Herself; As Spouse of the Prime Minister of South Africa

Personal details
- Born: 3 July 1864 Swellendam, Cape Colony, British Empire
- Died: 20 May 1937 (aged 72) Sezela, Natal, South Africa
- Party: South African Party
- Spouse: Louis Botha (m. 1886)
- Children: 5
- Parents: John Cheere Emmett (father); Helen Laetitia Bland (mother)
- Education: St. Michael's School

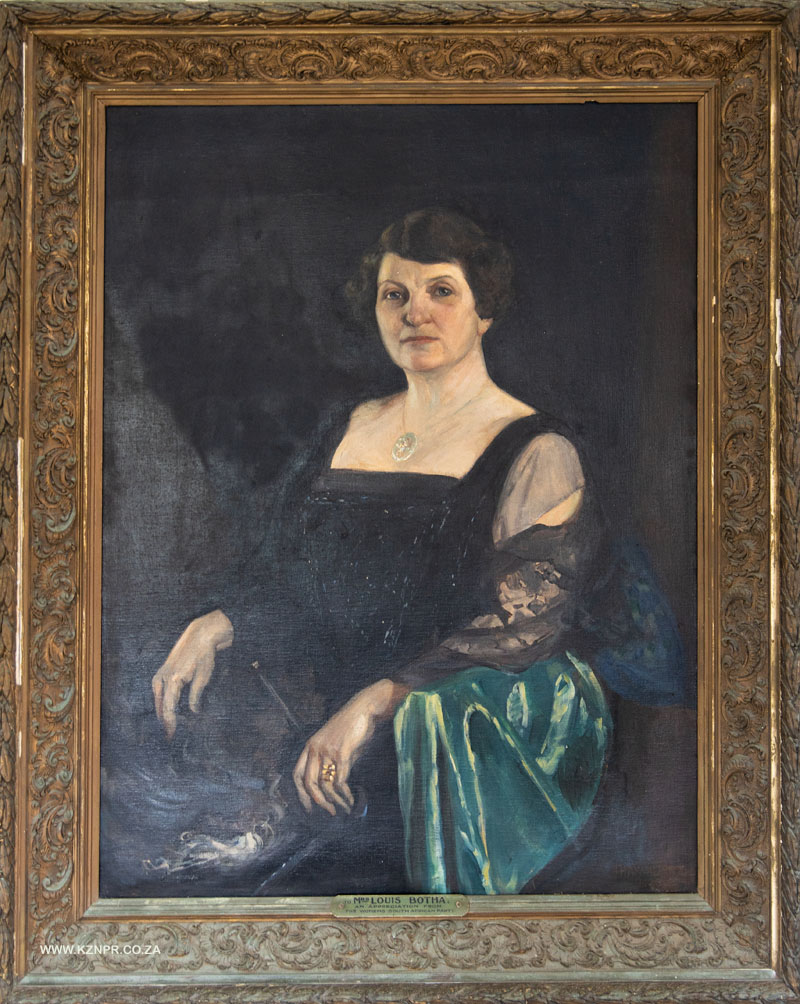
Unknown painter: Mrs. Louis Botha, Botha House, Pennington, KwaZulu-Natal, South Africa. Further text on the plaque: "An appreciation from / the Womens South African Party".

Annie Botha (née Emmett; 3 July 1864 – 20 May 1937) was a South African civic leader and political hostess. She was the wife of Louis Botha, who served as the first Prime Minister of South Africa. She established an orphanage in South Africa and, with Georgiana Solomon, co-founded and chaired the South African Women's Federation.

== Biography ==
=== Young years ===
Botha was born Annie Frances Bland Emmett on 3 July 1864 in Swellendam to John Cheere Emmett (Swellendam, 19 March 1822 – Pretoria, 26 January 1905), a farmer, and his wife, Helen Laetitia Bland (also Helena Letitia du Plessis Bland or Helena Aletta Emmett, born at George, Western Cape, 9 December 1833 – died 1895). Annie was an elder sister to Transvaal Boer War Bittereinder general Joseph James Cheere Emmett (J.C. Emmett, Swellendam, 19 January 1866 – 16 August 1933). She was raised in the Anglican faith and her family were members of the Church of the Province of Southern Africa. In 1869, her family moved to the Orange Free State and settled on a farm between Harrismith and Vrede. She was educated at St. Michael's School, an Anglican school in Bloemfontein run by the Community of St Michael and All Angels. Botha later taught at the school until she moved with her parents to Vryheid.

=== Marriage to Louis Botha ===
While living in Vryheid, she met Louis Botha. They married at the Dutch Reformed Church in Vryheid on 13 December 1886 and had five children. Botha later converted from Anglicanism to Dutch Reformed Protestantism. Shortly after their wedding, they settled on the Waterval Farm in Vryheid.

=== Second Boer War, 1899–1902 ===
During the Second Boer War, the family relocated to Pretoria and remained there after the occupation of the city in 1900 by British forces led by Frederick Roberts, 1st Earl Roberts. Botha's husband served as a Boer general and later as Commander in Chief of the Transvall during the war. Herbert Kitchener, 1st Earl Kitchener persuaded Botha to find out if her husband would be willing to meet with him, after it seemed the Boer forces would not surrender. She was granted permission to visit him in Bothasberg, after a journey by train and a mule-pulled wagon. She convinced her husband to meet with Lord Kitchener in Middelburg in February 1901. The meeting was not a success for negotiations but the British proposals became a foundation for further deliberations in May 1902.

In 1901 Botha was allowed to go to Europe, where she remained until the war ended. While there, she hosted Boer generals Koos de la Rey and Christiaan de Wet as they raised money for war victims. She returned to South Africa in 1902 and found that their home had been destroyed, so the family settled in a home on Cilliers Street in Pretoria.

=== Community activities after the war ===
After the war, Botha and her husband went on a tour through the countryside to boost morale and provide food and other amenities to the people. On 19 October 1904, with Georgiana Solomon, she co-founded the South African Women's Federation and served as the chairwoman. The charity campaigned for the preservation of Afrikaner culture and people. She stepped down as chairwoman after her husband's election as Prime Minister of the Transvaal Colony but was nominated for a lifetime honorary presidency within the organization.

Botha established the Louis Botha Home for Orphans and Children in Need. In 1911, she travelled to England to attend the wedding of Hamar Greenwood and Margery Spencer.

After her husband's death in 1919, Botha settled on a farm in Rusthof and spent winters in Sezela, where she died in 1937.

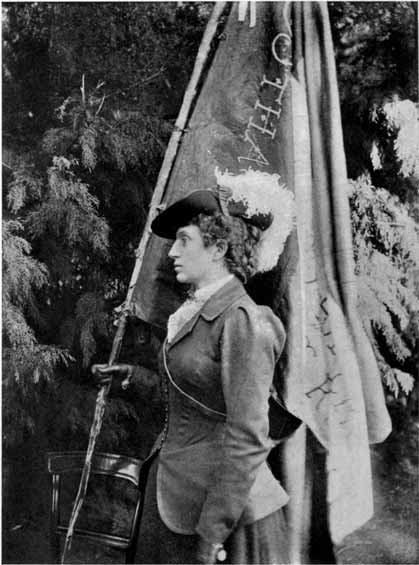
Annie Emmett with a flag, from Hillegas: With the Boers, 1900.

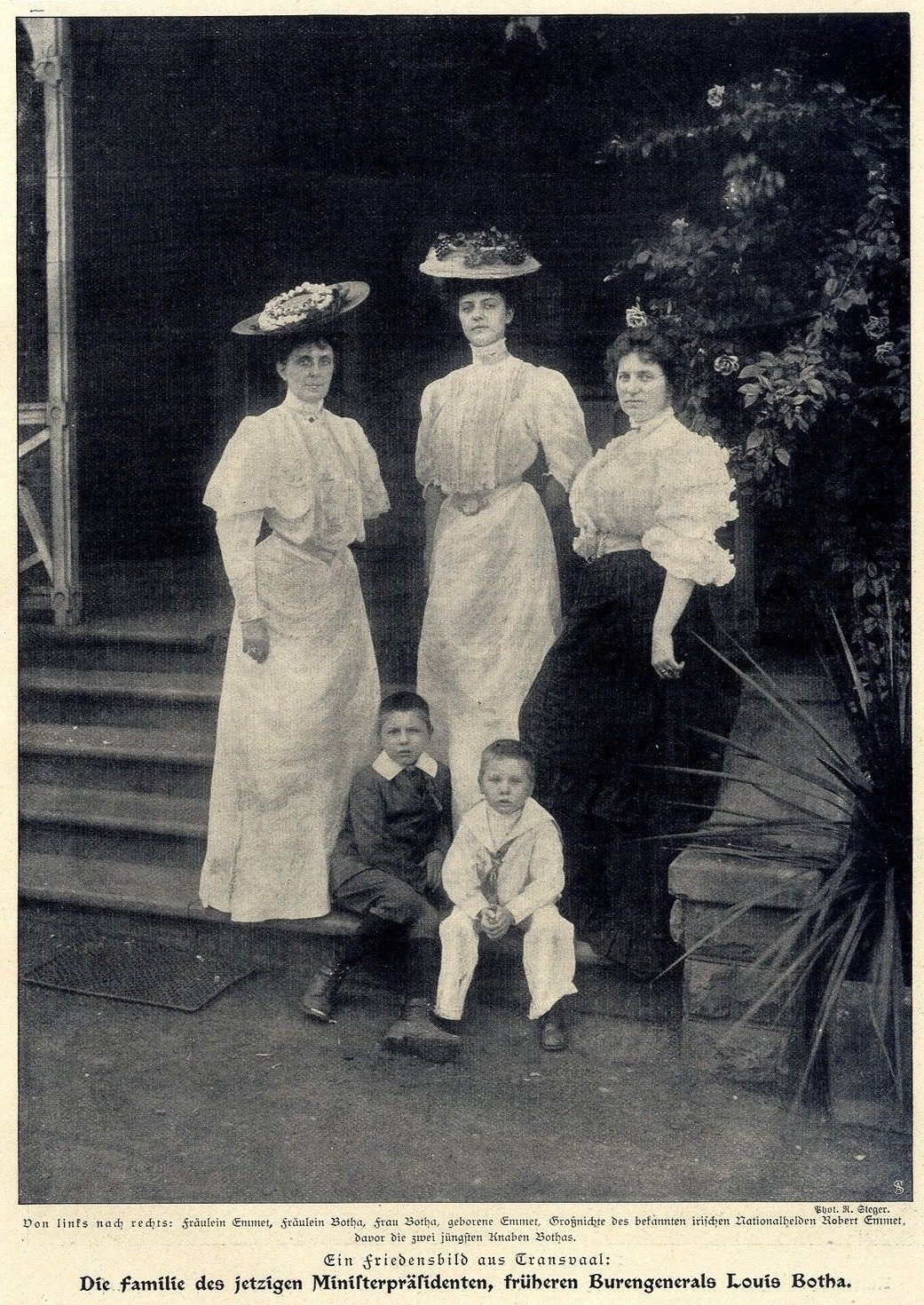
Rudolf Steger: Annie Emmett with two young women and two small sons, 1907

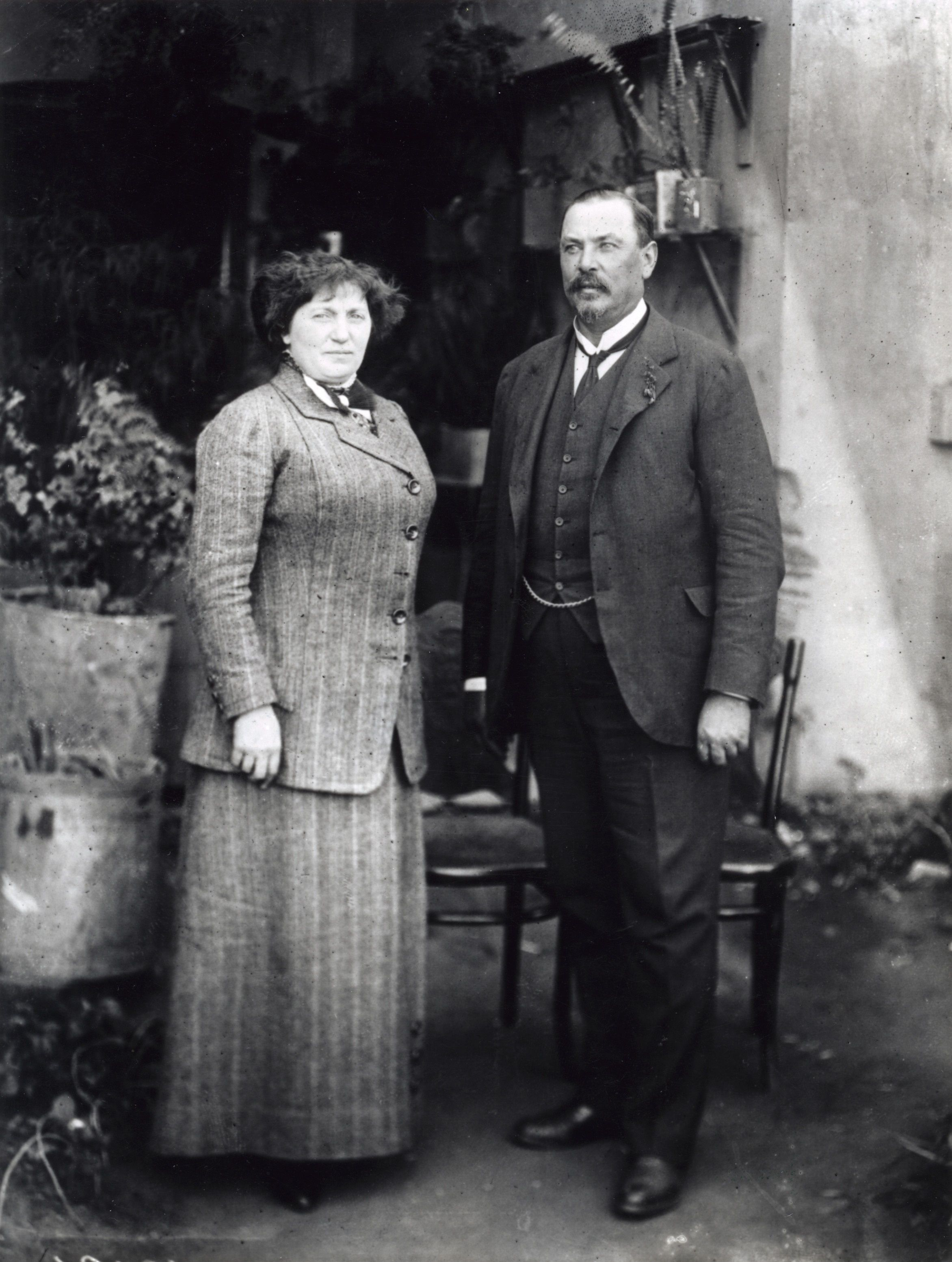
Annie Emmett and Louis Botha in Rustenburg around 1915, while Louis was prime minister of the Union of South Africa.
