= Mantsopa Local Municipality elections =

Local elections in the Free State, South Africa

The Mantsopa Local Municipality elections is a democratic process through which the residents of Mantsopa Local Municipality, located in the Free State province of South Africa, elect their local government representatives. The Mantsopa Local Municipality council consists of eighteen members elected by mixed-member proportional representation. Nine councillors are elected by first-past-the-post voting in nine wards, while the remaining nine are chosen from party lists so that the total number of party representatives is proportional to the number of votes received.

In the election of 3 August 2016, as well as the election of 1 November 2021, the African National Congress (ANC) won a majority of eleven seats on the council.

In the election of 4 November 2026, the ANC won a reduced majority of ten seats on the council.

== Results ==
The following table shows the composition of the council after past elections.

Event	ANC	COPE	DA	EFF	Other	Total
2000 election	11	—	4	—	0	15
2006 election	13	—	1	—	2	16
2011 election	13	1	3	—	0	17
2016 election	11	1	3	2	0	17
2021 election	11	1	4	2	0	18
2026 election	10	0	5	2	1	18

== December 2000 election ==
The following table shows the results of the 2000 election.

Party	Ward			List			Total seats
Party	Votes	%	Seats	Votes	%	Seats	Total seats
African National Congress	8,458	73.91	7	8,668	75.86	4	11
Democratic Alliance	2,610	22.81	1	2,759	24.14	3	4
Independent candidates	376	3.29	0				0
Total	11,444	100.00	8	11,427	100.00	7	15
Valid votes	11,444	96.54		11,427	96.42		
Invalid/blank votes	410	3.46		424	3.58		
Total votes	11,854	100.00		11,851	100.00		
Registered voters/turnout	23,903	49.59		23,903	49.58		

== March 2006 election ==
The following table shows the results of the 2006 election.

Party	Ward			List			Total seats
Party	Votes	%	Seats	Votes	%	Seats	Total seats
African National Congress	9,524	76.87	8	9,913	82.42	5	13
Democratic Alliance	658	5.31	0	1,151	9.57	1	1
Independent candidates	1,059	8.55	0				0
Pan Africanist Congress of Azania	431	3.48	0	421	3.50	1	1
African Christian Democratic Party	419	3.38	0	327	2.72	1	1
Freedom Front Plus	298	2.41	0	216	1.80	0	0
Total	12,389	100.00	8	12,028	100.00	8	16
Valid votes	12,389	97.18		12,028	94.49		
Invalid/blank votes	359	2.82		701	5.51		
Total votes	12,748	100.00		12,729	100.00		
Registered voters/turnout	25,809	49.39		25,809	49.32		

== May 2011 election ==
The following table shows the results of the 2011 election.

Party	Ward			List			Total seats
Party	Votes	%	Seats	Votes	%	Seats	Total seats
African National Congress	10,197	71.50	9	10,398	75.72	4	13
Democratic Alliance	1,945	13.64	0	1,941	14.13	3	3
Congress of the People	1,034	7.25	0	1,061	7.73	1	1
Independent candidates	750	5.26	0				0
Freedom Front Plus	222	1.56	0	180	1.31	0	0
African People's Convention	71	0.50	0	107	0.78	0	0
African Christian Democratic Party	42	0.29	0	46	0.33	0	0
Total	14,261	100.00	9	13,733	100.00	8	17
Valid votes	14,261	97.75		13,733	94.61		
Invalid/blank votes	329	2.25		782	5.39		
Total votes	14,590	100.00		14,515	100.00		
Registered voters/turnout	27,157	53.72		27,157	53.45		

== August 2016 election ==
The following table shows the results of the 2016 election.

Party	Ward			List			Total seats
Party	Votes	%	Seats	Votes	%	Seats	Total seats
African National Congress	9,916	65.83	8	9,895	66.33	3	11
Democratic Alliance	2,817	18.70	1	2,834	19.00	2	3
Economic Freedom Fighters	1,723	11.44	0	1,551	10.40	2	2
Congress of the People	328	2.18	0	331	2.22	1	1
Freedom Front Plus	150	1.00	0	132	0.88	0	0
African People's Convention	51	0.34	0	124	0.83	0	0
United Residents Front	78	0.52	0	50	0.34	0	0
Total	15,063	100.00	9	14,917	100.00	8	17
Valid votes	15,063	98.32		14,917	98.37		
Invalid/blank votes	257	1.68		247	1.63		
Total votes	15,320	100.00		15,164	100.00		
Registered voters/turnout	28,376	53.99		28,376	53.44		

== November 2021 election ==
The following table shows the results of the 2021 election.

Party	Ward			List			Total seats
Party	Votes	%	Seats	Votes	%	Seats	Total seats
African National Congress	7,285	58.96	8	7,374	60.23	3	11
Democratic Alliance	2,959	23.95	1	2,925	23.89	3	4
Economic Freedom Fighters	1,225	9.91	0	1,241	10.14	2	2
Congress of the People	360	2.91	0	321	2.62	1	1
Freedom Front Plus	148	1.20	0	161	1.31	0	0
African Transformation Movement	117	0.95	0	133	1.09	0	0
Independent candidates	186	1.51	0				0
Afrikan Alliance of Social Democrats	31	0.25	0	31	0.25	0	0
United Independent Movement	19	0.15	0	42	0.34	0	0
Africa's New Dawn	26	0.21	0	16	0.13	0	0
Total	12,356	100.00	9	12,244	100.00	9	18
Valid votes	12,356	98.52		12,244	98.51		
Invalid/blank votes	185	1.48		185	1.49		
Total votes	12,541	100.00		12,429	100.00		
Registered voters/turnout	27,612	45.42		27,612	45.01		

=== By-elections from November 2021 ===
The following by-elections were held to fill vacant ward seats in the period from the election in November 2021.

Date	Ward	Party of the previous councillor	Party of the newly elected councillor
17 Jan 2024	7	Democratic Alliance	Democratic Alliance

== November 2026 election ==
The following table shows the results of the 2026 election.

Party	Ward			List			Total seats
Party	Votes	%	Seats	Votes	%	Seats	Total seats
African National Congress	8,163	55.29	8	8,206	54.72	2	10
Democratic Alliance	3,897	26.40	1	4,072	27.15	4	5
Economic Freedom Fighters	1,103	7.47	0	1,135	7.57	2	2
Freedom Front Plus	287	1.94	0	302	2.01	1	1
South African Communist Party	270	1.83	0	262	1.75	0	0
African Congress for Transformation	185	1.25	0	214	1.43	0	0
Congress of the People	164	1.11	0	167	1.11	0	0
Patriotic Alliance	83	0.56	0	198	1.32	0	0
South African Royal Kingdoms Organization	91	0.62	0	86	0.57	0	0
Activists Movement of South Africa	90	0.61	0	85	0.57	0	0
uMkhonto weSizwe Party	143	0.97	0				0
Mantsopa People's Parliament	64	0.43	0	68	0.45	0	0
African Transformation Movement	60	0.41	0	68	0.45	0	0
African Content Movement	51	0.35	0	56	0.37	0	0
United Africans Transformation	18	0.12	0	39	0.26	0	0
Afrika Mayibuye Movement	25	0.17	0	25	0.17	0	0
Independent candidates	47	0.32	0				0
Ekhethu Peoples Party	22	0.15	0	13	0.09	0	0
Total	14,763	100.00	9	14,996	100.00	9	18
Valid votes	14,763	97.54		14,996	98.08		
Invalid/blank votes	372	2.46		293	1.92		
Total votes	15,135	100.00		15,289	100.00		
Registered voters/turnout	30,401	49.78		30,401	50.29		
