= Thaba Phatswa =

- Location within Free State (South African province) Location within South Africa
- Coordinates: 29.316°S 27.119°E
- Country: South Africa
- Province: Free State
- District: Thabo Mofutsanyane
- Municipality: Mantsopa

Area
  - Total: 0.60 km^{2} (0.23 sq mi)

Population (2011)
  - Total: 915
  - Density: 1,500/km^{2} (3,900/sq mi)

Racial makeup (2011)
  - Black African: 22.7%
  - Coloured: 76.4%
  - Indian/Asian: 0.2%
  - White: 0.1%
  - Other: 0.5%

First languages (2011)
  - Afrikaans: 84.9%
  - Sotho: 9.4%
  - English: 2.6%
  - Tswana: 1.1%
  - Other: 2.0%
- Time zone: UTC+2 (SAST)

Thaba Phatswa is a town in Thabo Mofutsanyane District Municipality in the Free State province of South Africa.

The town lies some 30 km south-east of Thaba Nchu and 22 km north of Hobhouse. It takes its name, said to be of Tswana origin and to mean ‘black with white spots’, from the mountain a few kilometres to the south-west.
