= George Bourne (disambiguation) =

George Bourne (1780–1845) was an American abolitionist.

George Bourne may also refer to:

- George Bourne (footballer) (1929–2004), English footballer, played for Stoke City
- George Bourne (photographer) (1875–1924), New Zealand photographer
- George Bourne (rower) (born 1998), British rower
- George Hugh Bourne (1840–1925), English hymnodist, schoolmaster and warden
- George Sturt (1863–1927), English writer who sometimes used the pseudonym "George Bourne"
- George Bourne, fictional narrator of the Matt Braddock stories
