= Cathedral of St Andrew and St Michael, Bloemfontein =

Cathedral in South Africa

Coordinates: 29.1247°S 26.2152°E

The Cathedral of St Andrew and St Michael is a religious building affiliated with the Anglican Church of South Africa and is located at 85 St Georges Street in the city of Bloemfontein in the Free State province, South Africa.

It serves as the main church and seat of the Diocese of the Free State which was created in 1863. The current dean is Lazarus Mohapi.
