= Patrick Glover =

South African Anglican bishop

(Elistan) Patrick Glover (born 1 February 1944) was the Bishop of Bloemfontein (from 2003, styled 'of the Free State'), from 1997 until his retirement in 2012.

He was educated at Keble College, Oxford, and ordained in 1969. He began his career with curacies at St Peter’s Church, Krugersdorp, and St Martin’s-in-Veld, Johannesburg. After this he was rector of St Catherine’s, Johannesburg, and then of St George’s, in the same city, before becoming dean of Bloemfontein in 1987. In 1994 he became a suffragan bishop and three years later a diocesan.

== Awards ==
Appointed as chaplain to the Venerable Order of St. John.

Anglican Church of Southern Africa titles
Preceded by Tom Stanage	Bishop of the Free State; 1997-2012	Succeeded by Dintoe Letloenyane
