= Claerhout =

Claerhout is a Dutch surname used in Belgium. Notable people with the surname include:

- Arthur Claerhout (1887–1978), Belgian cyclist
- Frans Claerhout (1919–2006), Belgian painter
- May Claerhout (1939–2016), Belgian sculptor
