= Tweespruit =

- Location within Free State (South African province) Location within South Africa
- Coordinates: 29°11′08″S 27°01′44″E
- Country: South Africa
- Province: Free State
- District: Thabo Mofutsanyane
- Municipality: Mantsopa

Area
  - Total: 5.1 km^{2} (2.0 sq mi)

Population (2011)
  - Total: 5,791
  - Density: 1,100/km^{2} (2,900/sq mi)

Racial makeup (2011)
  - Black African: 90.5%
  - Coloured: 5.3%
  - Indian/Asian: 0.3%
  - White: 3.5%
  - Other: 0.4%

First languages (2011)
  - Sotho: 84.3%
  - Afrikaans: 9.1%
  - English: 2.0%
  - Sign language: 1.5%
  - Other: 3.1%
- Time zone: UTC+2 (SAST)
- Postal code (street): 9770
- PO box: 9770
- Area code: 051

Tweespruit is a small dairy farming town in the Free State province of South Africa. The town lies 27 km east of Thaba Nchu and 47 km north of Hobhouse.

== History ==
Afrikaans for "two creeks", the name refers to the town’s location at the confluence of two small rivers.

The town started as an experimental farm set up on an old British Boer War settlement which was between two creeks, hence the name.

== Education ==
- Unicom Agricultural Secondary School
- Tweespruit Primary School
- Unicom Primary School
- Tweespruit Combined School
- Ezekiel Christian School
- Dawiesville Primary School

== Notable people from Tweespruit ==
- Father Frans Claerhout, artist and priest at Tweespruit mission station.
- Michael Anthony (Pez) Parsonson, SAAF fighter pilot.
