= Mantsopa Local Municipality =

Coordinates: 29°11′40″S 27°27′22″E

Mantsopa
- Local municipality
- Seal

- Location in the Free State
- Country: South Africa
- Province: Free State
- District: Thabo Mofutsanyana
- Seat: Ladybrand
- Wards: 9

Government
  - Type: Municipal council
  - Mayor: Mamsie Tsoene (ANC)

Area
  - Total: 4,291 km^{2} (1,657 sq mi)

Population (2022)
  - Total: 55,897
  - Density: 13.03/km^{2} (33.74/sq mi)

Racial makeup (2022)
  - Black African: 86.4%
  - Coloured: 4.0%
  - Indian/Asian: 1.3%
  - White: 8.3%

First languages (2011)
  - Sotho: 82.1%
  - Afrikaans: 9.8%
  - English: 4.1%
  - Sign language: 1.4%
  - Other: 2.6%
- Time zone: UTC+2 (SAST)
- Municipal code: FS196

Mantsopa Municipality (Sotho: Masepala wa Mantsopa) is a local municipality within the Thabo Mofutsanyana District Municipality, in the Free State province of South Africa.

== Origin of the name ==
Basotho prophet 'Mantsopa Makhetha was a cousin to King Moshoeshoe I, who banished her from the Kingdom when he suspected that her powers were greater than his. When she arrived at Modderpoort there were no houses and, according to legend, she stayed in a cave. In 1886 a group of men called The Brotherhood of St Augustine arrived at Modderpoort, and 'Mantsopa accommodated them in her cave. The missionaries decided to stay and they turned the cave into a chapel. 'Mantsopa later joined the church and was baptised and given the name Anna. 'Mantsopa's grave continues to be visited and offerings are still placed on or near it.

== Main places ==
The 2001 census divided the municipality into the following main places:

Place	Code	Area (km^{2})	Population	Most spoken language
Borwa	40601	0.42	3,294	Sotho
Dipeleng	40602	0.15	822	Sotho
Excelsior	40603	11.37	485	Afrikaans
Hobhouse	40604	11.79	2,589	Sotho
Ladybrand	40605	43.05	4,214	Afrikaans
Mahalatswetsa	40606	1.64	4,881	Sotho
Manyatseng	40608	2.64	14,177	Sotho
Thaba Phatswa	40609	2.17	434	Afrikaans
Thusanong	40610	0.56	2,989	Sotho
Tweespruit	40611	3.04	1,056	Sotho
Remainder of the municipality	40607	4,213.08	20,377	Sotho

== Politics ==
The municipal council consists of eighteen members elected by mixed-member proportional representation. Nine councillors are elected by first-past-the-post voting in nine wards, while the remaining nine are chosen from party lists so that the total number of party representatives is proportional to the number of votes received.

In the election of 4 November 2026, the African National Congress (ANC) won a reduced majority of ten seats on the council.

The following table shows the results of the election.

Party	Ward			List			Total seats
Party	Votes	%	Seats	Votes	%	Seats	Total seats
African National Congress	8,163	55.29	8	8,206	54.72	2	10
Democratic Alliance	3,897	26.40	1	4,072	27.15	4	5
Economic Freedom Fighters	1,103	7.47	0	1,135	7.57	2	2
Freedom Front Plus	287	1.94	0	302	2.01	1	1
Independent candidates	47	0.32	0				0
13 other parties	1,266	8.58	0	1,281	8.54	0	0
Total	14,763	100.00	9	14,996	100.00	9	18
Valid votes	14,763	97.54		14,996	98.08		
Invalid/blank votes	372	2.46		293	1.92		
Total votes	15,135	100.00		15,289	100.00		
Registered voters/turnout	30,401	49.78		30,401	50.29		
