= Wagga (disambiguation) =

Wagga is short for Wagga Wagga, a city in New South Wales, Australia.

Wagga or Wagga Wagga may also refer to:

== Wagga ==
- RAAF Base Wagga, a Royal Australian Air Force base
- HMAS Wagga, a ship

== Wagga Wagga ==
- City of Wagga Wagga, a local government area, New South Wales, Australia
- Wagga Wagga Likoebe, actually Leonard Likoebe (1953–2006), South African footballer known as Wagga Wagga

== See also ==
- Reduplication
