= Mmabana Stadium =

Stadium in Free State, South Africa

- Location: Thaba 'Nchu, Free State, South Africa

Mmabana Stadium is a stadium in Thaba 'Nchu, Free State, South Africa. It is used mostly for football matches and is the home ground of Mangaung City. An international women's football tournament, featuring teams from Lesotho and South Africa, was held at the stadium in 2018.
