= 'Mantsopa =

Basotho Prophetess (1793–1908)

Selaoli Mantsopa
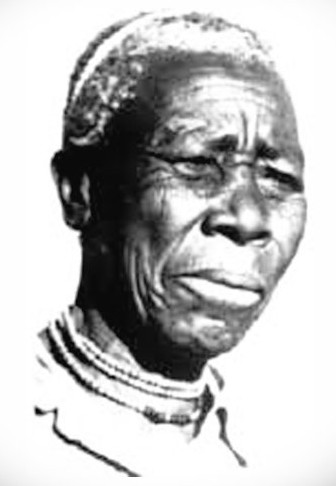

Selaoli, Moroka, Ngaka
- Born: Ntsopa Makhetha c. 1793; Ramakhetheng
- Residence: Lethoteng (Modderpoort)
- Died: 8 November 1906; Lethoteng (Modderpoort)
- Venerated in: Rose Chapel (Cave Church)
- Influences: Mohlomi a Matsie

Selaoli Mantsopa Anna Makhetha (1793–1908), often referred to as 'Mantsopa, was a Basotho spiritual guider, rainmaker, and storyteller. She advised King Moshoeshoe I and predicted the outcomes of several battles, including the Battle of Viervoet in 1851 and the Battle of Berea in 1852. She was exiled to Modderpoort in the late 1860s, where she converted to Christianity and was baptised in 1870. She fused Christianity with her own traditional Basotho customs.

== Early life and background ==
'Mantsopa was born in 1793 in Likotsi or Ramakhetheng, (Note: David B. Coplan records that 'Mantsopa was born in Koena-li-fule ("the crocodiles are feeding"), while other sources say that her name was Koena-li-fule and that she was born in Likotsi or Ramakhetheng.) west of the Caledon River in the present day Free State province of South Africa. Born to her father Makhetha and her mother Sesilane, her uncle was the great Chief-Philosopher Mohlomi, who mentroed many influencial leaders including King Moshoeshoe I. She was descended from royalty of Bakwena ba Monaheng and named after the folktale teller Ntsopa.

== Prophecies, rainmaking, and exile ==
By the 1840s, 'Mantsopa was renowned as a rainmaker, seer, and diviner. She called for the preservation of Basotho customs, uniting the Sotho people during a time when there was frequent raiding between Afrikaner settlers and the Basotho as well as a growing risk of war with the British-administered Orange River territory. She was a talented storyteller and travelled to the lowlands of her cousin King Moshoeshoe I's territories, rallying the people against Christian missionaries and calling on them to support their high chiefs and uphold Basotho traditions.

The earliest documented and most famous prophecy of 'Mantsopa occurred in 1851. Major Henry Douglas Warden, British Resident in the Orange River Sovereignty, demanded that the Basuto restore cattle and horses to the victims of their past cattle raids. He had mustered a force of 2,500 to attack Moshoeshoe. 'Mantsopa predicted that Moshoeshoe would have a swift victory and that there would be rain to end an ongoing drought. The Battle of Viervoet was won by Moshoeshoe's forces on 30 June 1851. It also rained that day.

Eight years later, French Protestant missionary leader Eugène Casalis recorded 'Mantsopa's prophecy, writing:

"In 1851 war had become inevitable... Manchupa [sic], a woman until then unknown, informed the chief she had fallen into a trance and that a being, whom she designated in no other way than by the words He and Him, had charged her to tell the whole tribe to stand on the defensive, that the enemy would come, and would be destroyed in a contest so sharp, and of such short duration, that it would be called the Battle of Hail."

Following 'Mantsopa's success in predicting the results of the battle, she became an adviser to King Moshoeshoe I and his sons, especially 'Masupha and Joel. She then prophesied that Moshoeshoe I would defeat Colonel George Cathcart's forces at Berea, which they did on 20 December 1852 at the Battle of Berea. She also told the Moshoeshoe the day in October 1853 that he would attack his old rival Batlokwa chief Kgosi Sekonyela and bring his fortress to ruins.

As 'Mantsopa gained moral and spiritual authority, Moshoeshoe I feared her growing influence and exiled her in the late 1860s. She moved with her husband across the river to Modderpoort (Sesotho: Lekhalong la Bo Tau). After her exile, 'Mantsopa correctly prophesied the defeat of the Basotho, angering Basotho military leaders.

== Christianity in Modderpoort ==
In Modderpoort, 'Mantsopa gained the acceptance of the Christian missionaries. French missionary and reverend Theophile Jousse made the claim that he had converted 'Mantsopa to Christianity at Thaba Bosiu in Lesotho in 1868. St. Augustine's Priory was established in Modderpoort in 1867 near her residence and she was in contact with the Anglican fathers there. She adopted Christianity, at least nominally, and was baptised on 13 March 1870. She took the baptismal name Anna Makhetha and fused Christianity with traditional ancestor worship. She attended church functions and was active as an Anglican. They considered her the prophet of a Christian covenant with the Basotho. During the ramp-up to the Basuto Gun War of 1880–1881, she was accused of "spawning crowds of female prophetesses, who harassed mission stations and inveighed against the Cape colonial authorities."

== Death and legacy ==
'Mantsopa died in 1908. According to the logbook of the Society of the Sacred Mission, 'Mantsopa died on the evening of 8 November 1906 and was buried with Christian rites.

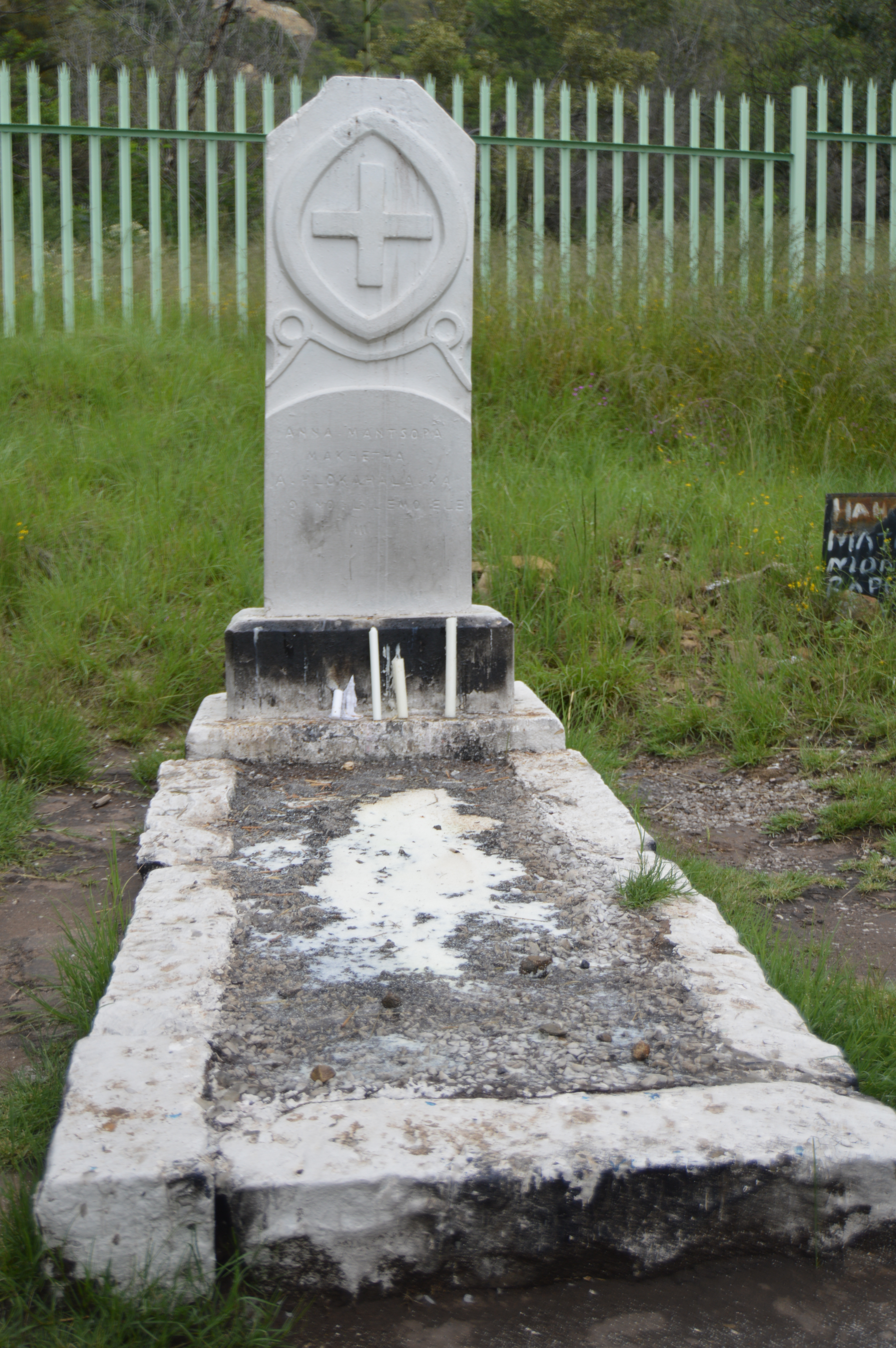
The grave of 'Mantsopa at St. Augustine's Mission

'Mantsopa's grave is in the cemetery of Modderpoort. Her grave is located in the white part of the cemetery. It is a pilgrimage site, and visitors place stones on her gravestone or make offerings at the spring where she bathed.

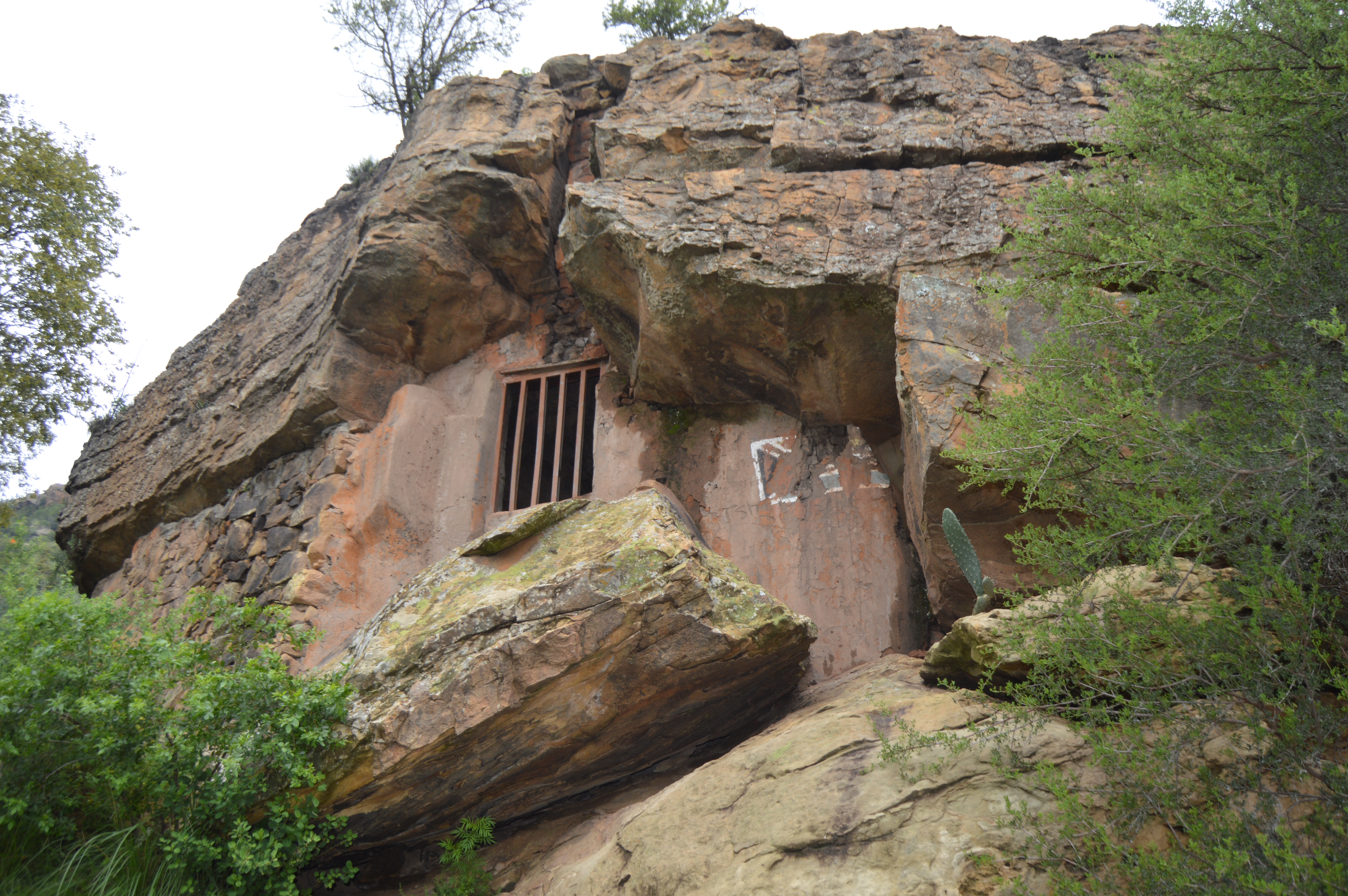
'Mantsopa's cave

After her death, a legend emerged that 'Mantsopa had lived in the walled-in cave at St. Augustine's Mission, which had formerly been a shelter and a private chapel. The legend related that she had used the cave as a place for prayer and healing. She had worshipped at a natural well in the forest, but there is no evidence that she had worshipped or lived in the cave. The cave is under the administrative control of the Anglican Church.

David B. Coplan, in the Dictionary of African Biography, writes that "'Mantsopa stands out as not only as a symbol, but indeed as a still influential embodiment of gendered female spiritual leadership and power linking the postcolonial present to the precolonial past."

The Mantsopa Local Municipality in Free State was renamed for her by the provincial government in 2002.

In 2024 Dr Jerry Mofokeng wa Makhetha wrote and directed a theatre play to celebrate 200 years of Basotho.This event also coincided with the 58th anniversary of Lesotho's independence. The play was also shown in 2025.
