= Tom Stanage =

Bishop of Bloemfontein (1932–2020)

Thomas Shaun Stanage (1932 – 18 March 2020) was bishop of Bloemfontein in the Anglican Church of Southern Africa from 1982 to 1997.

== Biography ==
Stanage was born in Ireland in 1932 and was educated at Pembroke College, Oxford (BA 1956, MA 1960) and Cuddesdon College (1956–58).

He was ordained deacon in 1958, priest in 1959 and bishop in 1978 and went on to serve as an assistant curate of Great Crosby St Faith 1958–61, Minister of Orford St Andrew Conventional District (1961–63) and vicar of St Andrew's Church, Orford (1963–70).

He has lived and worked in South Africa since 1970. In 1975 he was appointed Dean of Kimberley, remaining in office until 1978 when he was elected suffragan bishop of Johannesburg. He was appointed as the diocesan bishop, holding the see of Bloemfontein from 1982 until his retirement in 1997, Since retiring, he has been a lecturer in theology in the University of the Free State.

He received the degree of Doctor of Divinity honoris causa from Nashotah House in 1986.

== Arms ==
The arms granted to Stanage are blazoned Per chevron ploys, Azure and Argent, the peak ensigned with a fleur-de-lis Or, in dexter chief a horse salient contoumè and in sinister chief a lion rampant, Argent, in base a Celtic cross issuant Gules, voided Argent; the shield ensigned of an episcopal mitre proper.

== Sources ==
- "Episcopal Appointments". Anglican Communion News Service. 11 April 1997. Archived from the original on 30 September 2007.
- Crockford's Clerical Directory (97th edn, London: Church House Publishing, 2001), p. 711
- Government Gazette 15805 (24 June 1994), p. 4

Anglican Church of Southern Africa titles
Preceded by George A. Pullen	Dean of Kimberley; 1975 –1978	Succeeded by Roy Snyman
Preceded by	Suffragan Bishop of Johannesburg; 1976 –1982	Succeeded by
Preceded by Frederick Amoore	Bishop of Bloemfontein; 1982–1997	Succeeded by Patrick Glover
