= Barolong-Boo-Seleka =

South African ethnic group

The Barolong-Boo-Seleka (BBS) nation has been based in Thaba 'Nchu since 1833. It is led by Kgosi Gaboilelwe Moroka, the daughter of the late Kgosi Makgopa Moroka; she was crowned after some dispute about the legitimacy of a woman as Chief.
