= Lazarus Mohapi =

Lazarus Mohapi is the current Anglican Dean of Bloemfontein in South Africa: he was installed on 10 March 2013.
