= Allan Webb (bishop) =

Indian bishop (1839–1907)

The Right Reverend Allan Becher Webb
- Bishop of Grahamstown
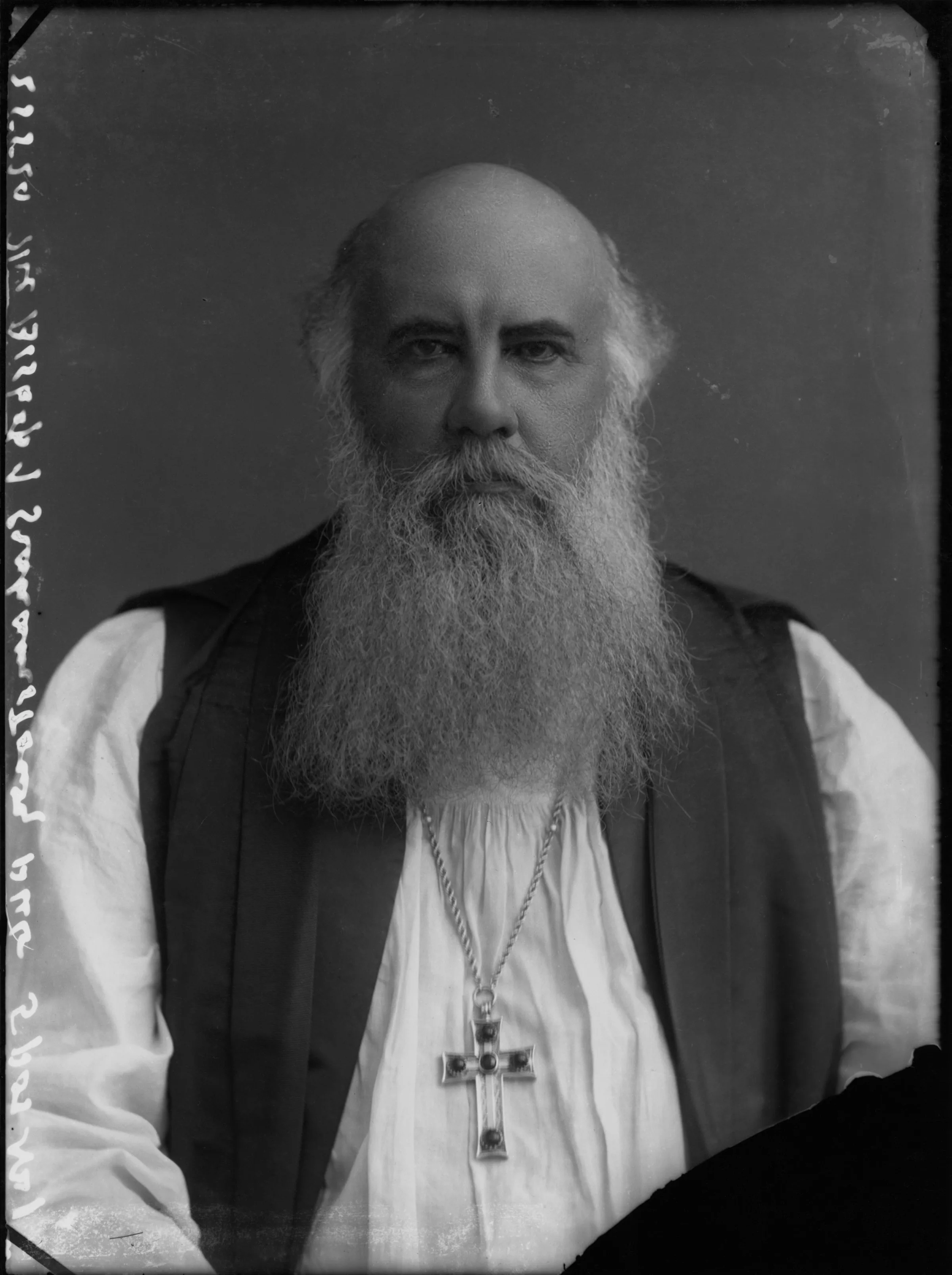
- Portrait by Alexander Bassano, 1895
- Church: Anglican Church of Southern Africa
- Diocese: Grahamstown
- In office: 1883 to 1898
- Predecessor: Nathaniel Merriman
- Successor: Charles Cornish
- Other posts: Bishop of Bloemfontein (1870–1883); Dean of Salisbury, Church of England (1901–1907)

Orders
- Consecration: c. 1870

Personal details
- Born: Allan Becher Webb; 1839
- Died: 1907 (aged 67–68)

Allan Becher Webb (also spelled "Alan"; 1839–1907) was the second Anglican Bishop of Bloemfontein, afterward Bishop of Grahamstown and, later, Dean of Salisbury.

== Early years ==
Webb was born in 1839 in Calcutta, India, the son of Allan Webb, a surgeon in the Bengal Army who later became a professor of anatomy at the Calcutta Medical College and built a pathological museum of physical specimens for medical pedagogy. Allan Webb was baptised on 17 November 1839 in India. He was educated at Rugby School and subsequently at Corpus Christi College, Oxford University, becoming a fellow and tutor at University College (1863–1868). From 1864 to 1867 he was vice principal at Cuddesdon Theological College. He married Elizabeth, the sister of hymn-writer George Hugh Bourne, who served as his chaplain (1879–1898). They had three children: Cyprian, Charles (The Rev. Charles Johnstone Bourne Webb, 1874–1963), and a daughter, who died young and is commemorated in the window to Webb in the north choir transept of Salisbury Cathedral.

Webb's first posting was as rector of Avon Dassett.

== Bishop of Bloemfontein ==
On St. Andrew's Day (30 November) 1870 Webb responded to an appeal from Bishop Robert Gray of Cape Town to accept the Bishopric of Bloemfontein in the interior of South Africa. He was consecrated at Inverness Cathedral in Scotland and sailed for the Cape on 25 April 1871, arriving in Cape Town on 28 July.

One of Webb's first tasks was to oversee the establishment of the Anglican Church on the Diamond Fields in the west of the Diocese of Bloemfontein. From this foundation would eventually spring (in 1911) the Diocese of Kimberley and Kuruman. Other major works included the establishment of the Community of St Michael and All Angels, a nursing order based in Bloemfontein and Kimberley, where Sister Henrietta Stockdale pioneered aspects of nursing and provided for the first state registration of nurses in the world. Under Webb the Brotherhood of St Augustine of Hippo grew in strength at Modderpoort in the eastern Free State.

== Bishop of Grahamstown ==
In 1883, on the advice of the Archbishop of Canterbury (Edward Benson) and of the Metropolitan Archbishop of Cape Town (William West Jones), Webb accepted his unanimous election as the Bishop of Grahamstown. There the cathedral congregation had been split by controversy between St George's and a pro-cathedral of St Michael. Webb's arrival is referred to as the "era of pacification" and by the end of 1885 he had succeeded in reuniting the divided factions. The building of the St. Michael and St. George Cathedral commenced in the 1890s, the chancel being consecrated in 1893.

Webb resigned from Grahamstown in 1898, going first as provost at Inverness Cathedral.

== Dean of Salisbury ==
In June 1901, Webb became dean of Salisbury, where he died in 1907. A set of three stained glass windows in Salisbury Cathedral were dedicated to his memory.

== Role in creation of sisterhoods ==
Webb was one of the first Anglican bishops to support and nurture corporate women's work in the church through the formation of sisterhoods: The Community of St Michael and All Angels in Bloemfontein and Kimberley (a foremost member being Sister Henrietta); and the Community of the Resurrection of our Lord and St Peter's Home in Grahamstown (under the leadership of Mother Cecile)

== Styles and titles ==
- Mr Alan Webb ( –1863)
- The Revd Alan Webb (1863–1870)
- The Rt Revd Alan Webb (1870–1871)
- The Rt Revd Dr Alan Webb (1871– )

== Notes and references ==
- Lewis, Cecil; Edwards, G. E. (1935). South Africa: The Growth of the Church of the Province. London: Society for Promoting Christian Knowledge. Archived from the original on 24 February 2014.
- Webb, Allan Becher (1883). Sisterhood Life and Woman's Work, in the Mission-Field of the Church. London: Skeffington & Son.
- Lee, Sidney, ed. (1912). "Webb, Allan Becher" . Dictionary of National Biography (2nd supplement). London: Smith, Elder & Co.

Anglican Church of Southern Africa titles
Preceded by Edward Twells	Bishop of Bloemfontein; 1870 – 1883	Succeeded by George Wyndham Hamilton Knight-Bruce
Preceded by Nathaniel James Merriman	Bishop of Grahamstown; 1883 – 1898	Succeeded by Charles Edward Cornish
Church of England titles
Preceded by George David Boyle	Dean of Salisbury; 1901-1907	Succeeded by William Page Roberts
