= Tsala ea Becoana =

Newspaper

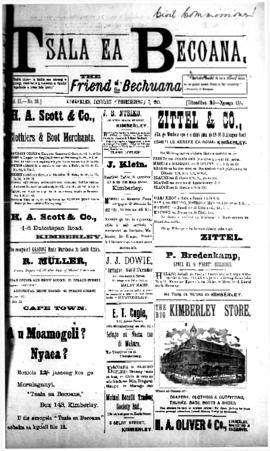
- First Issue, 1910
- Founder: Sol Plaatje
- Founded: 1910
- Ceased publication: 1915
- Political alignment: Neutral
- Language: Tswana / English
- City: Kimberley
- Country: South Africa

Tsala ea Batho / Tsala ea Becauna (“Friend of the people” or “Friend of the Becuana”) was a Tswana and English language newspaper based in Kimberly, Cape Province, between 1910 and 1915. It was a politically nonpartisan newspaper, running topical news and opinions that would interest black people in South Africa.

== History ==
Tsala ea Becauna was founded by Sol Plaatje in 1910 in Kimberly, Northern Cape. It was the second Tswana and English language newspaper Sol Plaatje founded and edited. Articles in Sepedi often featured in the publication too. The newspaper was published multilingually as Plaatje was concerned that Setswana could disappear completely due to decreasing use. The first newspaper, Koranta ea Becauna was founded in Mafikeng in 1901, but the newspaper collapsed at the end of May 1909 because of financial difficulties.

Along with his family, Plaatje left Mafikeng for Kimberly, where the Seleka Barolong of the Tswana Nation funded the establishment of Tsala ea Batho. The Seleka Barolong were wealthy business people who lived in the Wesleyan Methodist mission community of Thaba Nchu in the Orange Free State.

The first edition of Tsala ea Becauna was published in June 1910. It was a four-page weekly aimed at Tswana speakers in the Becuanaland protectorate and other Tswana speakers in South Africa. The newspaper eventually began to have national reach.

== Editorial ==
In the first year of publication, the newspaper was focussed on the impending union of the colonies and republics — Cape Colony, Natal, Transvaal and Orange Free State — together as the Union of South Africa. Tsala ea Becauna was against the union because it would grant dominion to the white minority over Africans. The union between the British and the Afrikaner excluded Africans from the vote and stripped Africans from their land. Tsala ea Becauna advocated for the Bechuanaland Protectorate (now the Republic of Botswana), Swaziland (now Eswatini), and Basutoland (now the Kingdom of Lesotho) to join South Africa.

With Plaatje as the editor, Tsala ea Becuana also reported on the Native Land Act and the paper referred to the act as the “extermination” of black Africans in the country.

Tsala ea Becauna often published news on strikes and letters from miners among reports of African welfare, industrial colour bars, poor wage earnings and low pensions. The newspaper could not ignore miners and their concerns in Kimberly because of predominance of mine labourers. The newspaper also carried national and international correspondence obtained from other publications and editorials and commentaries on their editorial page. The newspaper reported on matters of interest such as assaults committed by white miners against black labourers. The newspaper enjoyed watchdog status.

The newspaper expressed modest views as is exemplified by their opposition to strikes.

After Sol Plaatje became the first General Secretary of the South African Native National Congress (SANNC), later African National Congress, the newspaper was increasingly viewed as an organ of the party by its readers. The newspaper contains records of the early meetings of the African National Congress.

== Late History ==
Tsala ea Becauna was renamed Tsala ea Batho (“Friend of the People”) in April 1913. The name change reflected a growing national awareness and a shift from tribe to nation.

The publication struggled to stay open despite a circulation reportedly in the thousands and consistent advertising. Another contributing factor was that Plaatje left for Britain in May 1914, on the brink of World War I, as a member of the SANNC deputation protesting the Natives’ Land Act, and Tsala ea Batho came to an end during the prolonged time he was forced to spend overseas.

The English-Setswana weekly, Tsala ea Becauna, was one of the organs of black political news and opinion for the turbulent period of its existence.

== See also ==
- Xhosa language newspapers
- Tswana language
