= Francis Balfour (bishop) =

English bishop

The Right Reverend Francis Richard Townley Balfour (21 June 1846 – 3 February 1924) was Assistant Bishop of Bloemfontein from 1910 until his death.

He was born at Sorrento, the second son of Blayney Townley-Balfour and his wife Elizabeth Catherine Reynell. He was educated at Harrow and Trinity College, Cambridge; and Cuddesdon. He was ordained deacon in 1872, and priest in 1874. After a curacy in Buckingham he went out as a missionary, firstly to Basutoland and then to Mashonaland. He was Archdeacon of Bloemfontein from 1901 until 1906; and of Basutoland from 1907 to 1922.

Francis Balfour died at Shankill, Dublin on 3 February 1924.
