= Pule Lechesa =

South African essayist, literary critic, poet, and publisher

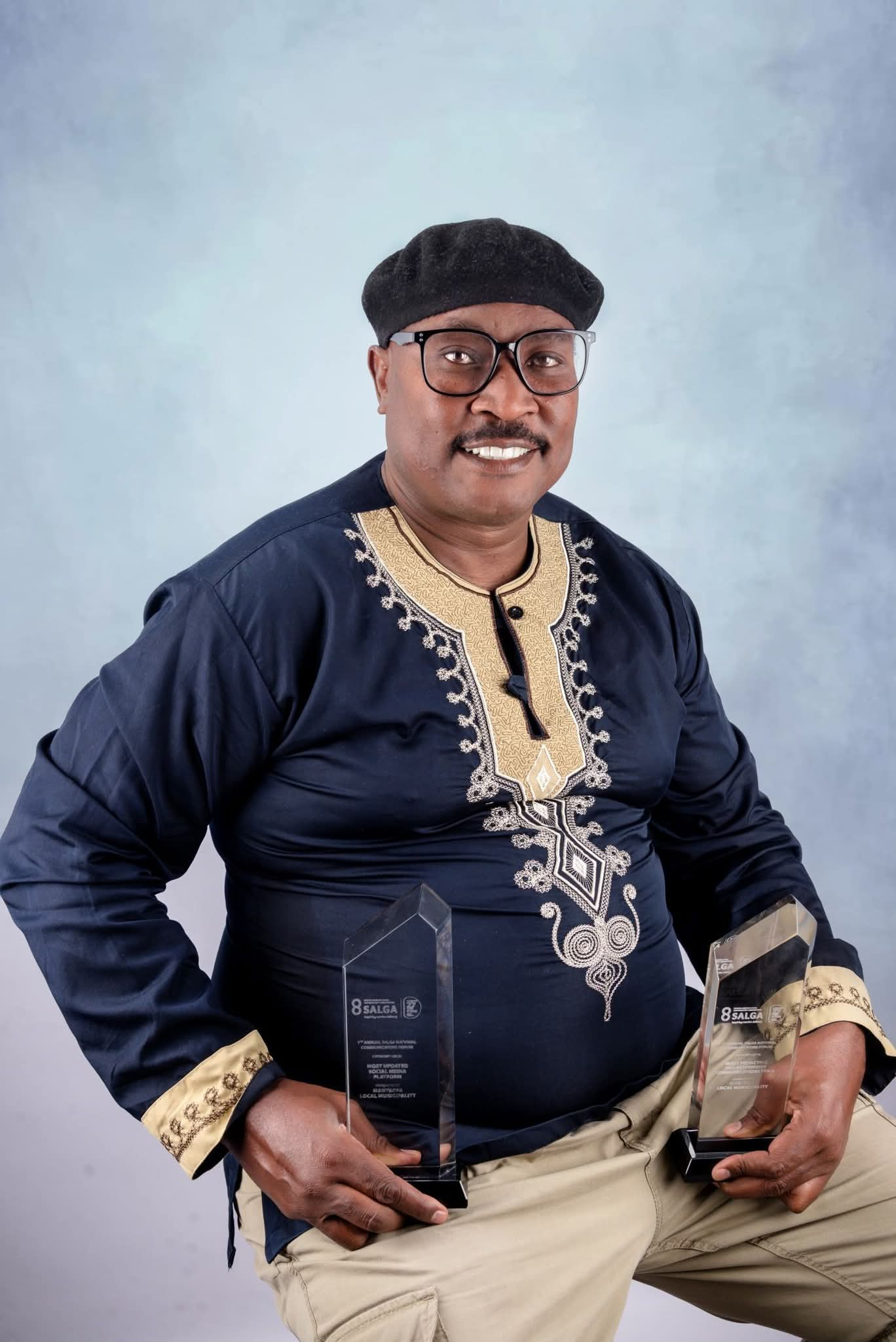
Pule Lechesa

Pule Lechesa (born 1976) is a black South African essayist, literary critic, poet, and publisher. His published books include Four Free State Authors (2005), The Evolution of Free State Black Literature (2006), and, Omoseye Bolaji...on Awards, Authors, Literature (2007). Pule Lechesa is the founder and main editor of Phoenix Press Publishers (in Ladybrand), which continues to publish sundry fiction, poetry, short stories, and criticism. His latest published books are Essays on Free State Black Literature (2012), Bolaji in his Pomp (2013), and A penny for Lechesa's Thoughts (2016).

Also a competent African sports writer, Lechesa was one of the football journalists who attended a FIFA-sponsored training session that took place in Nairobi, Kenya, in March 2010. He has since left a South African daily newspaper called The New Age to become a copy editor at Free State's largest weekly title, Public Eye Newspaper. In 2015, Pule Lechesa published a monograph on distinguished Sesotho writer K. P. D. Maphalla. He is now the spokesperson for Mantsopa Municipality in South Africa.
