= George Hugh Bourne =

English hymnodist (1840–1925)

George Hugh Bourne (8 November 1840 – 2 December 1925) was a hymnodist, schoolmaster and warden, chaplain to the Bishop of Bloemfontein, and ultimately on the staff of Salisbury Cathedral as Sub-dean and Prebendary.

== Early life and education ==
He was born on 8 November 1840 at St Paul's Cray, Kent, England. Bourne was the son of the Revd R. B. Bourne and was educated at Eton College and at Christ Church, Oxford (BA 1863, BCL 1866, DCL 1871).

== Career ==
Taking Holy Orders in 1863, he served as Assistant Curate of Sandford-on-Thames, 1863 to 1865. Subsequently Bourne was Head Master of St. Andrew’s Chardstock, 1866 to 1874 and afterwards Warden of St. Edmund’s, Salisbury, 1874 to 1885.

From 1879 to 1898, Bourne served as Chaplain to the Bishop of Bloemfontein (later of Grahamstown), South Africa, the Rt Revd Alan Becher Webb, who was married to Bourne’s sister.

Bourne was appointed Sub-dean of Salisbury Cathedral, 1887 to 1901, and as Treasurer and Prebendary of Salisbury Cathedral, 1901 (where his brother-in-law Bishop Webb took up the Deanship after his retirement from South Africa),

Bourne died on 2 December 1925 at St. Edmund's College, Salisbury, England, aged 85.

== Hymns ==
Bourne wrote a number of hymns, the best known of which is his hymn "Lord, Enthroned in Heavenly Splendour". It was originally part of a set of Seven Post-Communion Hymns (1874), published privately for St. Edmund’s College, Salisbury, which then gained wider circulation after 1889 when five of the original ten stanzas appeared in the Supplement to the 1875 edition of Hymns Ancient and Modern. It was, in turn, assigned a more central place among Communion Hymns in subsequent editions and revisions of that prominent Anglican hymnal. The hymn is set to the tune "St. Helen" by George Clement Martin. Bourne’s other hymns include "O Christ, Our God", "O Christ, the King of Human Life", "Of the Wondrous Body", "O My Tongue Be Telling" and "Scarce Discerning Aught Before Us".
