= Frans Claerhout =

Belgian painter (1919–2006)

- Born: 15 February 1919; Pittem, West Flanders
- Died: 4 July 2006 (aged 87); Bloemfontein

Frans Claerhout (15 February 1919 – 4 July 2006) was a Belgian painter who spent most of his adult life in South Africa.

== Biography ==
Claerhout was born in Pittem, West Flanders in 1919, and moved to South Africa as a missionary for the Catholic Church in 1946, at the age of 27. He moved after completing his training for the priesthood. His first post was in the Transvaal but in 1948 he was transferred to the Orange Free State. He stayed on a farm near Bloemfontein in the Free State province of South Africa. He worked as a priest and in his spare time he concentrated on his art.

Claerhout was a self-taught painter who created landscapes and figures in oil paint. He started painting more after relocating to Thaba Nchu in 1960, and became known for his style, which used vivid colors and incorporated items such as donkeys, sunflowers and figures of people he met through his everyday life. His work was inspired by Christian spirituality and Claerhout he painted biblical scenes. He also worked in pastel, ink, pencil and charcoal.

In May 2000, Claerhout painted a golden bird on the flyleaf of a book that he gifted to novelist Zakes Mda. Mda subsequently dedicated his fifth novel, The Madonna of Excelsior, to the golden bird painted by Father Frans Claerhout.

Claerhout died of pneumonia at age 87 in 2006. He died in his sleep after being admitted to a hospital in Bloemfontein. He led a solitary life and before his death, he lived at the St. Francis Catholic Mission in Tweespruit, Free State, a home for pensioned Catholic priests.

== Artistic style ==
Claerhout had no formal art training but came from an artistic family, and had belonged to a local art society during his student years. Claerhout has been defined as an expressionist painter and his work referenced Flemish Expressionism especially the works of Constant Permeke, whose paintings, like Claerhout's, were concerned with agricultural labourers and the land they tend. Examples of his work, characterised by their warm colours, thick impasto paint, exaggerated forms, humour and compassion were exhibited widely in South Africa, as well as in Belgium, Canada, Germany, the United States and the United Kingdom.

In 1958 he joined a group of painters, writers and art patrons who formed an art movement in the Free State, which became known as the Bloemfontein Group.

He suffered a heart attack in 1979 while visiting Belgium and later that year he had bypass surgery in South Africa. After the operation Claerhout's art underwent a colour evolution from the initial Flemish inspired earthy palette to one of brightness. His artistic legacy includes other media such as sculpture, wall-paintings, monotype and linocut, stained glass drawings and crayon.

Claerhout donated much of the earnings from his versatile artwork to fund the building of housing and schools and support the people of his mission in and around Bloemfontein and Thaba Nchu. In 2002, Claerhout caused an uproar when he revealed that several of his artworks were forgeries. The forgeries were printed and sold by a Bloemfontein art dealer over several online auction sites.

Father Claerhout was also an author who wrote several books, including four works of poetry.
