= Maria Moroka Nature Reserve =

Maria Moroka National Park is named after Chieftainess Maria Moipone Moroka of the Barolong Tribe in Thaba Nchu. The national park is near Thaba Nchu in the Mangaung District of the Free State Province, South Africa. The park perimeter surrounds the Moutloatse Setlogelo Dam (previously known as the Groothoek Dam) which is a popular angling area. The Thaba Nchu (Tswana for "Black Mountain") mountain range is to the north of the national park.

== Climate ==
The national park comprises grassland vegetation. The area is a summer rainfall region with most rain falling between November and March. The winter season between May and August is clear although temperatures can drop to below freezing at night. Frost are frequent in the winter and snowfall occasionally occurs in the mountainous regions.

== Wildlife ==
The animals found in the reserve include several species of mammals such as Burchell's zebra, black wildebeest, eland, springbok, blesbok, red hartebeest, jackals, vultures and white rhinos. There are also more than 100 different bird species including many water fowl species which frequent the Montloatse Setlogelo Dam. The blue crane also frequents the reserve.

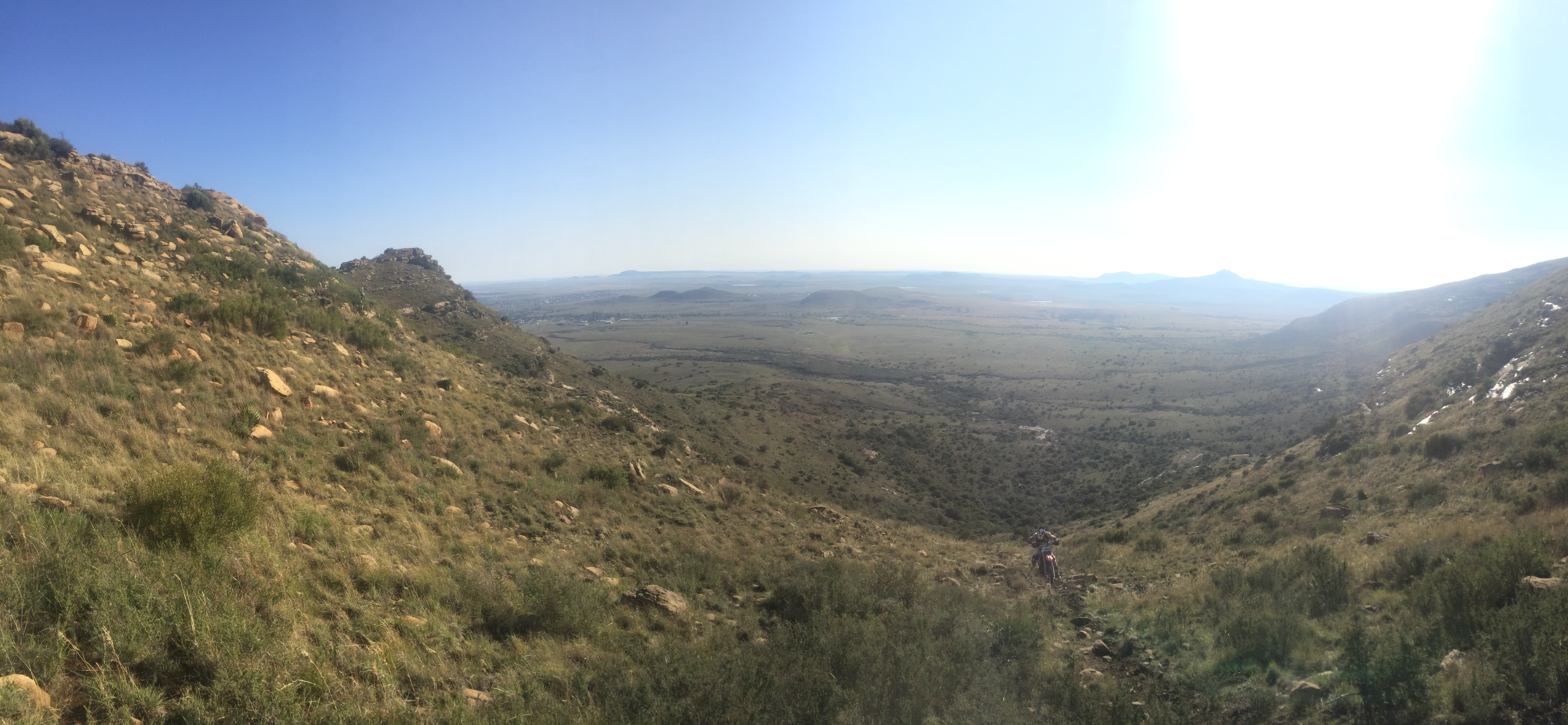
The Thaba Nchu environment

== Activities ==
There is a 9 km hiking trail to the Thaba Nchu mountain. Other activities include braai facilities, picnic areas, wildlife day tours, tennis, mini golf, cabaret shows, and angling.

== See also ==
- Sacred caves of the Basotho
- Tswana people
