= Modderpoort Sacred Sites =

The Sacred Sites of Modderpoort are located in the Eastern Free State of South Africa. Four sites are included in the overall collection:

- The San Rock Paintings
- The Anglican Church and Cemetery
- Mantsopa's Grave
- The Cave Church (or Rose Chapel)

== World Heritage Status ==
The collection of sites was added to the UNESCO World Heritage Tentative List on June 30, 1998 in the Cultural category, and removed from the list in 2011.
