= Frederick Amoore =

English Anglican bishop

Frederick Andrew Amoore (6 June 1913 – 11 June 1996) was Bishop of Bloemfontein from 1967 to 1982.

He was educated at the University of Leeds, and ordained in 1937. He began his career with curacies in Clapham, England and Port Elizabeth, South Africa. After this he was Rector of St Saviour's, East London. From 1950 to 1962 he was Dean of St Albans Cathedral, Pretoria when he ascended to the episcopate.

Anglican Church of Southern Africa titles
Preceded by Bill Bendyshe Burnett	Bishop of Bloemfontein; 1967–1982	Succeeded by Thomas Shaun Stanage
