= Community of St Michael and All Angels =

The Community of St Michael and All Angels was an Anglican religious order of nuns in South Africa. The Community was founded by Allan Webb, the second Bishop of Bloemfontein in 1874 – although the idea was first mooted by Webb's predecessor, Edward Twells. In a letter he'd written in 1868, Twells highlighted the need for a Sisterhood to set up schools for girls in Bloemfontein.

Three novices and three lay helpers under Emma, a Mother Superior, traveled from England to Bloemfontein via Port Elizabeth, arriving towards the end of April 1874. They immediately opened a boarding school, St Michael's, and a day school. St Michael's School exists to this day as one of the leading schools in South Africa.

In 1877 the Community established the St George's Cottage Hospital in Bloemfontein, the first hospital in the Orange Free State.

The Community's work was extended to the nearby mining town of Kimberley, from 1876, where Henrietta Stockdale, a sister, pioneered the training of nurses at the Carnarvon Hospital. She was later influential in securing the first state registration of nurses in the world, in 1891.

A St Michael's School was established in Kimberley but did not survive beyond the first years of the twentieth century.

Sister Joan Marsh, the last member of the Community, died aged 97 in Bloemfontein in May 2016.

== Prominent members of the CSM & AA ==
- Henrietta Stockdale - the founder of professional nursing in South Africa. The Anglican Church of Southern Africa commemorates Sister Henrietta annually on 6 October, the anniversary of her death - the Synod of Bishops having placed her on the church's Calendar.
- Mary Hirst Watkins - qualified in nursing and midwifery under Sister Henrietta and is acknowledged as the founder of modern midwifery training in South Africa. Watkins established a school for midwives in Kimberley in 1893. Achieving renown, an appointment in England was offered – but the invitation letter reached Kimberley on the day that she died. Sister Mary Hirst Watkins is re-interred alongside Sister Henrietta in the grounds of St Cyprian's Cathedral, Kimberley.
- Enid Barber - qualified in England as a nurse and became an Anglican Missionary in the 1930s after surviving Tuberculosis caught from a patient whom she nursed until death. She needed to live at altitude and spent the rest of her life in Bloemfontein, using money sent by her sister to purchase the donkey cart used as the Community's first ambulance, eventually being fêted by the national media as 'Sister Theresa' of South Africa, and appearing on television. She knew Archbishop Desmond Tutu. Link to CSM & AA Ambulance Photos
