= Dintoe Letloenyane =

The Right Reverend Dintoe Stephen Letloenyane has been Bishop of the Free State since 2013. He was consecrated on 9 March 2013 at the University of the Free State.

Letloenyane was born in Kroonstad. He was ordained in 1997. He has served at St Matthias, Welkom; St Peters, Sasolburg and St Margaret, Bloemfontein.
