= Wagga Wagga Likoebe =

South African soccer player

Personal information
- Full name: Lebohang Leonard Likoebe
- Date of birth: 23 December 1953
- Place of birth: Ladybrand, South Africa
- Date of death: 31 October 2006 (aged 52)
- Place of death: Johannesburg, Gauteng
- Position: Winger

Senior career*
Years	Team	Apps	(Gls)
1970–1972	Maseru United		
1972–1977	Zulu Royals	120	(66)
1977–1982	Kaizer Chiefs	170	(95)
1982–1985	Wits University	102	(57)
Total		392	(218)
- * Club domestic league appearances and goals as of 24 October 2013

Leonard Likoebe (23 December 1953 – 7 November 2006) was a South African professional soccer player who played as a winger for Zulu Royals, Wits University and Kaizer Chiefs.

== Kaizer Chiefs ==
Born in Ladybrand, he played for Maseru United and later moved to Durban to join the Zulu Royals. In 1977, he transferred to the Kaizer Chiefs. Likoebe left the Chiefs in 1982 and joined Wits University.

== Style of play ==
His former teammate Vusi Lamola described Likoebe by saying "He was a rare striker that always scored important goals, he seldom left the field without scoring", which meant he was very prolific.

== After retirement ==
After retiring from professional football, Likoebe joined the soccer development program at the SAFA center in Klipspruit, Soweto, in 1985.

== Coaching career ==
In 2001, he was appointed as the head coach of National First Division side Ratanang Maholoisane.

== Nickname ==
Likoebe earned the nickname "Wagga Wagga" from fans after a champion racehorse that won the Durban July for his blistering pace in 2001.

== Death ==
On 7 November 2006, Likoebe died at the Helen Joseph Hospital in Auckland Park after a brief illness. His tombstone was created by Bataung Memorials, a memorial service company owned by former Kaizer Chiefs captain Jimmy Tau. He is survived by his widow, daughter, two sons, and a granddaughter.

=== Funeral ===
Likoebe's funeral took place on 11 November 2006 at the Avalon Cemetery, following a service held at the Roman Catholic Church in Extension 2.
