= Hobhouse, South Africa =

Hobhouse
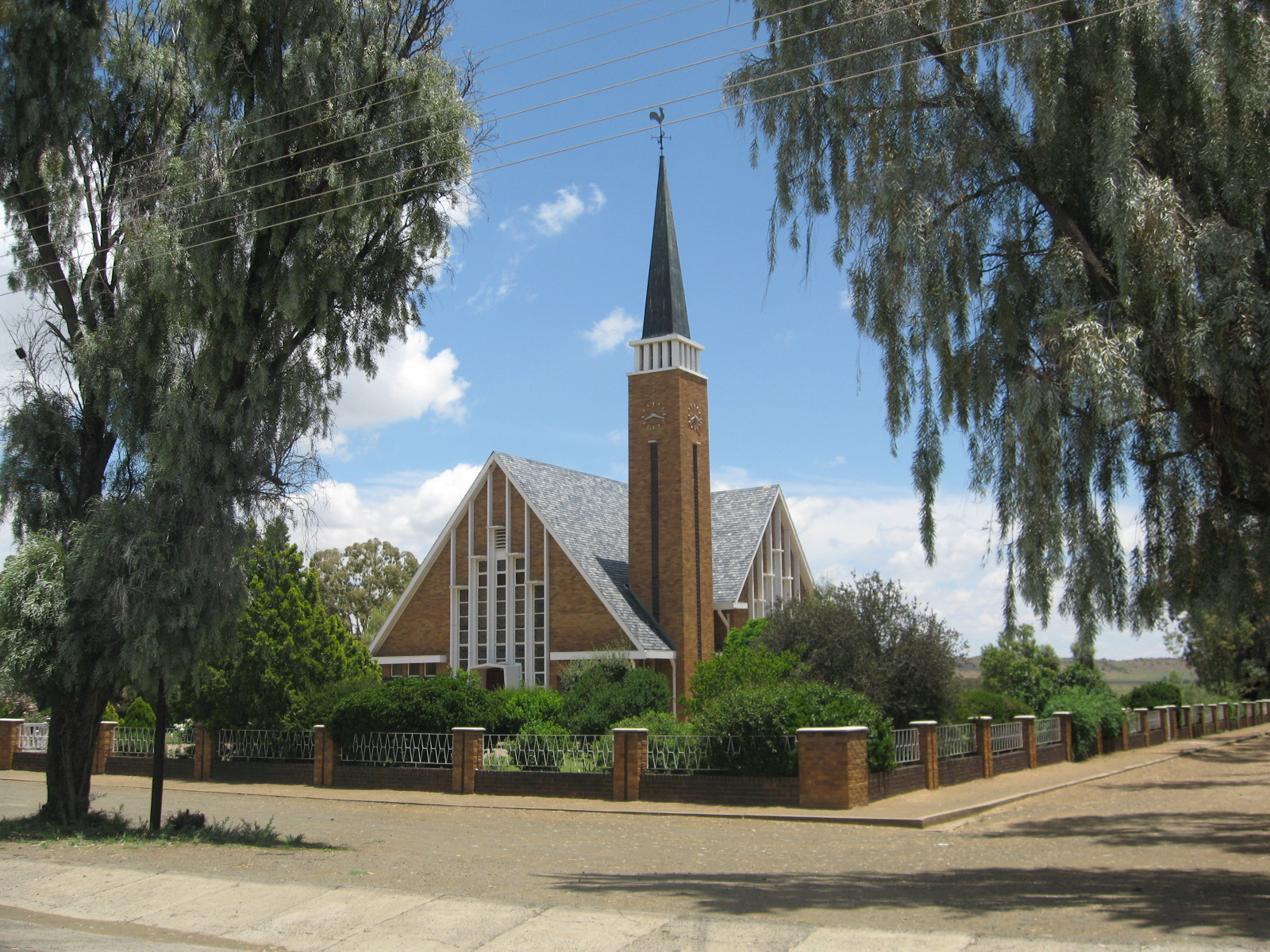
- Hobhouse, Dutch Reformed Church

- Location within Free State (South African province) Location within South Africa
- Coordinates: 29°31′41″S 27°08′29″E
- Country: South Africa
- Province: Free State
- District: Thabo Mofutsanyane
- Municipality: Mantsopa

Area
  - Total: 12.6 km^{2} (4.9 sq mi)

Population (2011)
  - Total: 244
  - Density: 19.4/km^{2} (50.2/sq mi)

Racial makeup (2011)
  - White: 44.67%
  - Black African: 42.62%
  - Coloured: 8.61%
  - Indian/Asian: 2.87%
  - Other: 1.23%

First languages (2011)
  - Afrikaans: 43.44%
  - Sotho: 38.11%
  - English: 14.34%
  - Other: 3.69%
- Time zone: UTC+2 (SAST)
- Postal code (street): 9740
- PO box: 9740
- Area code: 051

Hobhouse is a small farming and homesteading town in the Free State province of South Africa. Maize, wheat, and livestock are produced here.

== Background ==
The town lies 32 km north-east of Wepener and 51 km south-west of Ladybrand, near the Lesotho border. It was laid out on the farm Poortjie in 1912 and attained municipal status in 1913. It is named after Emily Hobhouse (1860-1926), author and philanthropist who brought to public notice abuses in concentration camps during the Anglo-Boer War.
