= Brotherhood of St Augustine of Hippo =

The Brotherhood of St Augustine of Hippo was an Anglican brotherhood founded in the Orange Free State, South Africa in 1867, and was based at Modderpoort from 1869, in the Diocese of Bloemfontein.

Edward Twells, the first bishop of Bloemfontein, had called for the establishment of a missionary brotherhood in 1865. In response, Henry Beckett left England for the Orange Free State in July 1867, with seven young men who would be the founding members of the Brotherhood of St Augustine of Hippo.

Twells had purchased the farms Modderpoort and Modderpoort Spruit in 1865 as a base for missionary work in the area, but conflict in the region prevented the first group of brothers from settling there right away. The Brotherhood thus established itself initially at Springfield near Bloemfontein, starting its missionary work at Thaba Nchu.

Three of the group of seven fell away before the Brotherhood finally occupied Modderpoort in the autumn of 1869. Initially they occupied a cave.

A priory and a sandstone chapel dedicated to St Augustine of Hippo were built by the brothers.

Modderpoort was taken over, in 1902, by the Anglican Society of the Sacred Mission (SSM).
