= Ladybrand =

- Location within Free State (South African province) Location within South Africa
- Coordinates: 29°11′36″S 27°27′18″E
- Country: South Africa
- Province: Free State
- District: Thabo Mofutsanyane
- Municipality: Mantsopa
- Established: 1868

Area
  - Total: 42.0 km^{2} (16.2 sq mi)
- Elevation: 1,578 m (5,177 ft)

Population (2011)
  - Total: 4,218
  - Density: 100/km^{2} (260/sq mi)

Racial makeup (2011)
  - Black African: 37.2%
  - Coloured: 13.1%
  - Indian/Asian: 4.7%
  - White: 37.3%
  - Other: 3.7%

First languages (2011)
  - Afrikaans: 40.9%
  - Sotho: 31.1%
  - English: 20.4%
  - Tswana: 0.8%
  - Other: 3.1%
- Time zone: UTC+2 (SAST)
- Postal code (street): 9745
- PO box: 9745
- Area code: 051

Ladybrand is a small agricultural town in the Free State province of South Africa, situated 18 km from Maseru, the capital of Lesotho. Ladybrand is one of five towns that forms the Mantsopa Local Municipality. Founded in 1867 following the Basotho Wars, it was named after Lady (Catharina) Brand, the mother of the president of the Orange Free State, Johannes Brand.

The settlement of Ladybrand was created by Voortrekkers to give them control over the territories conquered and captured after the above-mentioned Basotho war.

== History ==
In 1867, a town was established on the farm Mauershoek. It was named after Sir Christoffel Brand's wife, Catharina Fredrica Brand. On 26 March 1900, during the Second Anglo-Boer War, Ladybrand came under the control of the British. A municipality was created in 1904.

== Notable residents ==
- Kobie Coetsee - lawyer, National Party politician and administrator as well as a negotiator during the country's transition to democracy.
- Nico Diederichs - State President of South Africa from 1975 to 1978.
- Lehlohonolo Majoro - Cape Town City FC striker 1986–present
- Wagga Wagga Likoebe - Kaizer Chiefs winger 1977-82
- Pule Lechesa - poet, literary critic, essayist
- Lefa Tsutsulupa - Morokwa Swallows midfielder 1975-2013
- Jurie van Vuuren (born 1993) - rugby union player for the Tel Aviv Heat
- Dan Pienaar - World War II military commander
