= Edward Twells =

British Anglican colonial bishop (1828–1898)

The Right Reverend Edward Twells
- Bishop of the Orange Free State
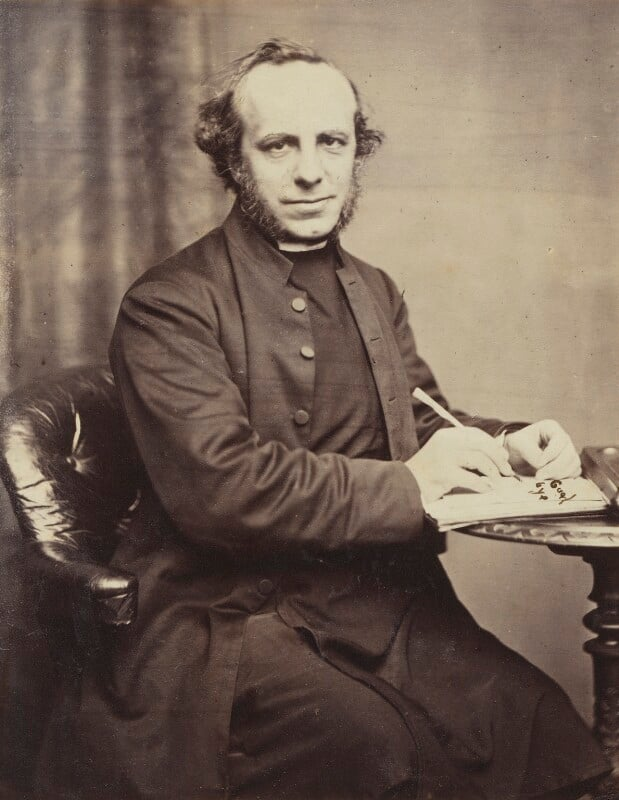
- Twells, c. 1863
- Diocese: Diocese of the Orange Free State
- In office: 1863–1869
- Successor: Allan Webb

Orders
- Consecration: 1863

Personal details
- Born: 1828
- Died: 4 May 1898 (aged 70)
- Denomination: Anglican

Edward Twells (1828 – 4 May 1898) was the first Bishop of Bloemfontein in South Africa from 1863 to 1869. He was the younger brother of Henry Twells. He died at the age of 70 at his house, Pembrokegate, at Clifton, Bristol.

Twells was consecrated Bishop of the Orange Free State in Westminster Abbey on 2 February 1863 under the Bishops in Foreign Countries Act 1841, and went out to the colony, in the interior of South Africa, with three priests and two schoolmasters.

In November 1863 Twells founded the Diocesan Grammar School since known as St. Andrew's School, Bloemfontein. He called for the establishment of a Missionary Brotherhood, in 1865, in response to which H. F. Beckett (Henry) left England for the Free State, in July 1867, with seven young men who would be the founding members of the Brotherhood of St Augustine of Hippo, later of Modderpoort.

In 1867, Twells went to the Lambeth Conference and was a proponent of the cause of Robert Gray, Bishop of Cape Town, in his battles with John Colenso, Bishop of Natal, over the control of the Diocese of Natal.

Twells resigned his bishopric in 1869 under a cloud following public allegations of pederasty.

== Sources ==
- Lewis, Cecil; Edwards, Gertrude Elizabeth (1934). Historical records of the Church of the Province of South Africa. London: Society for Promoting Christian Knowledge.
- Schoeman, Karel (1986). The Free State Mission: The Work of the Anglican Church in the Orange Free State, 1863–1883, as Described by Contemporaries. Human & Rousseau. ISBN 978-0-7981-1986-3.

Anglican Church of Southern Africa titles
New diocese	Bishop of the Orange Free State; 1863–1869	Succeeded by Allan Webb as Bishop of Bloemfontein
