= Modderpoort =

Location in South Africa

- Lekhalong la Bo Tau
- Location within South Africa
- 29°5′59.84″S 27°27′3.44″E
- Location: Eastern Free State, South Africa

Modderpoort, also known as Lekhalong la Bo Tau or ‘The Pass of the Lions’, is the site in the eastern Free State, South Africa, where the Anglican Missionary Brotherhood, the Brotherhood of St Augustine of Hippo, was established by Bishop Edward Twells in the late 1860s. It is also associated with the BaSotho prophet ‘Mantsopa, while the ‘sacred landscape’ in the vicinity includes San rock painting sites.

== St Augustine’s ==
Bishop Twells of Bloemfontein purchased the farms Modderpoort and Modderpoort Spruit in 1865 as a base for missionary work in the area. The property was situated within the so-called ‘Conquered Territory’ lost by the BaSotho through conquest in the years 1843-1869. It was in fact not before 1869 that Canon Henry Beckett, the Superior of the Society of St Augustine, accompanied by four brothers, set up the mission, initially in a cave converted as church and dwelling.

In 1871 the Priory was built while the sandstone Chapel, badly damaged in a mountain fire, was enlarged and rededicated in 1903. Meanwhile, Modderpoort had been taken over, in 1902, by the Anglican Society of the Sacred Mission (SSM).

Alongside the Priory is the cemetery, containing inter alia the graves of the Anglican Brothers who served at Modderpoort. Their graves are capped with beautifully carved sandstone which was quarried from the surrounding hills (the sandstone for the Union Buildings in Pretoria came from the same source). The sparrow that features in some of the carvings has reference to St Matthew 10:29-30.

By 1928, the SSM had established a School and a Training College for black teachers. Both these institutions were closed down in 1955, however, following the introduction of Apartheid and the implementation of the Bantu Education Act of 1953. Alumni from Modderpoort include Winkie Direko, a Premier of the Free State Province.

St Augustine’s operated subsequently as a Conference and Synod Centre and today includes Bed & Breakfast facilities.

== Mantsopa ==
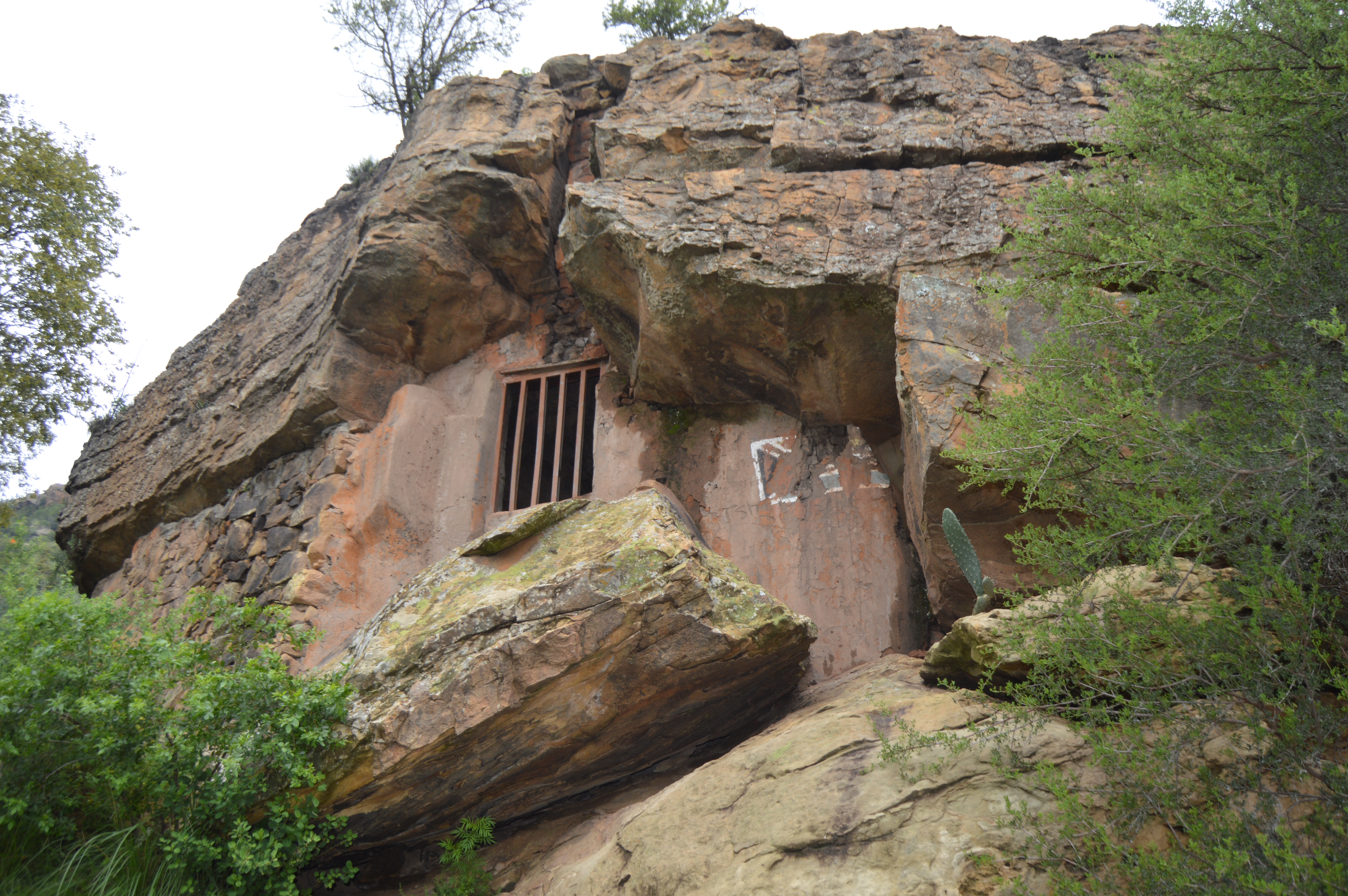
The cave of the local prophetess, Anna Mantsopa Makhetha

In the cemetery alongside the Priory lie the remains, besides those of missionary brothers and other former residents, of the legendary BaSotho prophet ‘Mantsopa, who died here on 11 November 1906. Makhetha Mantsopa was born in the region in about 1795. In 1851 she predicted that the BaSotho would triumph over colonial troops led by Major Warden. Renowned amongst her people for her seeing into the future and communicating with the ancestors, she was recognized instantly as a prophetess. Legend has it that over the years her influence became a threat to the power of the Basotho King Moshoeshoe. So it is said, Matsopa fled, finding refuge in the valley of Modderpoort. Here she was Christianised, baptized on 13 March 1870, and took the name Anna. (Moshoeshoe was to have been baptized on the same day, but died two days previously).

‘Mantsopa, it is suggested, practised a combination of Christian and traditional African rites which probably anticipated those of the modern Zionist Christian Church. Her memory is revered to this day, with Modderpoort becoming a site of pilgrimage in recent years, when offerings are sometimes placed at her grave or in the nearby Cave Church. Particularly, a sacred spring of fresh water at Modderpoort is associated with the Matsopa cult. Pilgrims collect “Matsopa Water” (now bottled) from the sacred spring, well regarded for its healing qualities.

Coplan indicates that these rites are but a part of a larger phenomenon of re-occupation, by re-use, of heritage and ritual sites in the Free State-Lesotho frontier. He notes that “Pilgrims to the sacred caves practise every form of African religion from pre-Christian Basotho ritual and medicine to independent Apostolic to established mission church Christianity.”

== Cave Church ==
The Cave Church, also known as the Rose Chapel, having been inhabited in Later Stone Age times, provided the first Anglican missionaries with shelter and their first place of worship. A century later, in 1970, members of the Zionist Christian Church (ZCC) began using it as an important pilgrimage site where the ancestors are felt to be strongly present. Offerings are typically placed here – snuff, that the ancestors may ‘breathe’ better; gambling tokens; scratch-and-win cards; crockery; food; money; written appeals and so forth. Candles are burnt during ceremonies which can involve several hundred people.

== San rock art ==
Additionally, rock painting sites form part of this ‘sacred landscape’ where the rock art relates to the beliefs and shamanistic ritual performances of San hunter-gatherers of the pre-colonial era. The site above the mission was declared a National Monument in 1936. It has been abused by visitors who have vandalized the paintings or splashed water to bring out the colours (depositing a film of salts, causing them to fade). The main panel at the site contains remarkable depictions of birds and an unusual winged figure with zigzag legs, believed to represent a shaman or priest who had assumed a bird-like form to undertake the journey to the spirit world. Flight is a widespread and recurring metaphor for altered states of consciousness in South African rock art and folklore.

== Tentative World Heritage listing ==
Modderpoort Sacred Sites has been placed on South Africa's Tentative List for UNESCO World Heritage Site inscription on June 30, 1998 in the Cultural category, and removed from the list in 2011

== See also ==
- Sacred caves of the Basotho
