= Diocese of the Free State =

Diocese of the Anglican Church of Southern Africa

Diocese of The Free State
- Coat of arms

Location
- Ecclesiastical province: Anglican Church of Southern Africa

Information
- Rite: Anglican
- Cathedral: Cathedral of St. Andrew and St. Michaels

Current leadership
- Bishop: Dintoe Letloenyane

Website
- www.dsc.co.za

The Diocese of the Free State is a diocese in the Anglican Church of Southern Africa. It was formerly known as the 'Diocese of Bloemfontein'.

== History ==
The first service North of the Orange River to be taken by an Anglican clergyman was conducted in 1850 by †Robert Gray, the first Bishop of Cape Town. In 1863, Edward Twells was consecrated the first Bishop of the Orange Free State and the Diocese was born. This new Diocese covered the area North of the Orange River, West of the Drakensberg and as far as the Zambezi River in the North.

The bishop arrived in Bloemfontein on 1 October 1863, with three priests and two teachers. George Mitchell was the first priest ordained in the Diocese, in 1865. The cathedral was completed and consecrated in 1866. The Brotherhood of St Augustine of Hippo was established in the diocese a year later with Canon Beckett and seven members. Together they built the first Anglican church in Thaba Nchu, completed in 1868. This pioneering community established the Church's work in Thaba Nchu and in places as far apart as Wepener and Harrismith and continued faithfully from their house at Modderpoort until their work was taken over by the Society of the Sacred Mission in 1902.

The first Diocesan Synod met in 1872 and a good foundation was laid for the organizational side of the Church's work. Two years later the need for Sisters for nursing, teaching and visiting was recognised and the Community of St Michael and All Angels was founded in Bloemfontein. Furthermore, the Transvaal became no longer the responsibility of Bloemfontein when the Anglican Diocese of Pretoria was formed in 1878. Then in 1891 the scope of the diocese again changed with the formation of the Anglican Diocese of Mashonaland.

In 1899, the year the Anglo Boer war broke out (Boer Wars), the diocesan bishop, Wale Hicks, died. Allan Webb resigned the See of Grahamstown and came back to look after his old diocese until a new bishop could be elected.

The first missionary conference was held in the Cathedral in 1904. Some years later, to aid the mission work of the church and oversight, the Anglican Diocese of Kimberley and Kuruman was established in 1911. This was repeated again in 1950 with the formation of the Anglican Diocese of Lesotho (then, Basutoland) and in 1952, with the founding of the Anglican Diocese of Matabeleland. In 2003 the diocese changed its name to the Diocese of the Free State.

The seat of the diocese is in Bloemfontein in South Africa.

== Archdeaconries ==
The Free State Diocese is divided into eight archdeaconries. The biggest archdeaconry being Goldfields. The archdeaconries are :

- Bloemfontein
- Greater Bloemfontein
- Sasolburg
- Goldfields
- Maluti
- South West Free State
- Far Eastern Free State
- Kroonstad

== Parishes ==
The diocese has a total of 69 parishes which are :

- St Agatha in Bultfontein
- St Luke in Hennenman
- St Peter & St Paul in Hertzogville
- St Michael in Hoopstad
- Holy Cross in Odendaalsrus
- St Mary in Odendaalsrus
- St Barnabas in Theunissen
- St Mark in Ventersburg
- St Alban in Virginia
- St Matthew in Virginia
- Annunciation in Welkom
- St Matthias in Welkom
- St Peter & St Paul in Welkom
- Church of Grace in Welkom
- St Clement in Winburg
- St Paul in Arlington
- St Aidan in Bethlehem
- St Augustine in Bethlehem
- St John The Baptist in Harrismith
- Transfiguration in Harrismith
- Tsiame in Harrismith
- St Matthew in Paul Roux
- African Martyrs in Phuthaditjhaba
- Holy Cross in Reitz
- St Mark in Vrede
- Church of The Visitation in Warden
- St Bernard The Martyr in Witzieshoek
- St Andrew in Botshabelo
- St Anthony in Botshabelo
- St Mary the Virgin in Botshabelo
- St Matthew in Botshabelo
- St Thomas in Botshabelo
- St Augustine in Thaba Nchu
- St Lawrence in Thaba Nchu
- Cathedral of St. Andrew and St. Michaels in Bloemfontein
- Holy Cross in Bloemfontein
- St Margaret in Bloemfontein
- St Patrick in Bloemfontein
- St Peter in Bloemfontein
- St Philip in Bloemfontein
- St Clare in Bothaville
- St George in Kroonstad
- The Resurrection in Kroonstad
- St Joan in Viljoenskroon
- Holy Redeemer in Clocolan
- All Saints in Ficksburg
- St Paul in Ficksburg
- St Mark & St George in Senekal
- St James in Ladybrand
- St Mary & St Joseph in Ladybrand
- St Columba in Marquard
- Tweespruit Anglican Church in Tweespruit
- St Stephen in Hilbron
- St Edward in Parys
- St Mary in Parys
- St Michael & All Angels in Sasolburg
- St Peter in Sasolburg
- St John in Fauriesmith
- St James in Jagersfontein
- Good Shepherd in Koffiefontein
- St Mary in Luckhoff
- St Oswald in Philippolis
- St Savior in Springfontein
- St George in Trompsburg
- St Felicitas in Dewetsdorp
- St Paul in Rouxville
- St Peter in Smithfield
- St John in Wepener
- St Athanasius in Zastron

== List of bishops ==
Bishops of Bloemfontein
From	Until	Incumbent	Notes
1863	1869	Edward Twells	Resigned among public allegations.
1870	1883	Allan Webb	Translated to Grahamstown; later Dean of Salisbury.
1886	1891	George Knight-Bruce	Translated to Mashonaland.
1892	1899	Wale Hicks	Died in office.
1899	1902	sede vacante: Ranulph Vincent, Dean of Bloemfontein was vicar general.	
1902	1920	Arthur Chandler	Retired to the United Kingdom.
1921	1935	Walter Carey	Resigned due to ill health and returned to the United Kingdom.
1935	1951	Arthur Howe-Browne	
1951	1957	Cecil Alderson	Translated from Damaraland; translated to Mashonaland.
1957	1967	Bill Burnett	Translated to Grahamstown, then Cape Town.
1967	1982	Frederick Amoore	
1982	1997	Thomas Stanage	Previously Suffragan bishop in Johannesburg since 1978.
1997	2003	Patrick Glover	Previously suffragan bishop in the diocese since 1994.
Bishops of the Free State
2003	2012	Patrick Glover	Retired to Knysna in the Diocese of George.
2013		Dintoe Letloenyane	Current

== Assistant bishops ==
Stanley Haynes was an assistant bishop of the diocese; from his consecration as a bishop in October 1923. Thomas Stainton succeeded Haynes in 1941.

== Coat of arms ==
The diocese assumed arms shortly after its inception. They were formally granted by the College of Arms in 1951, and registered at the Bureau of Heraldry in 1992 : Azure, a saltire Argent surmounted of a flaming sword erect proper; the shield ensigned of a mitre proper.
