= Thaba 'Nchu =

Town in Free State, South Africa

Thaba 'Nchu Blesberg
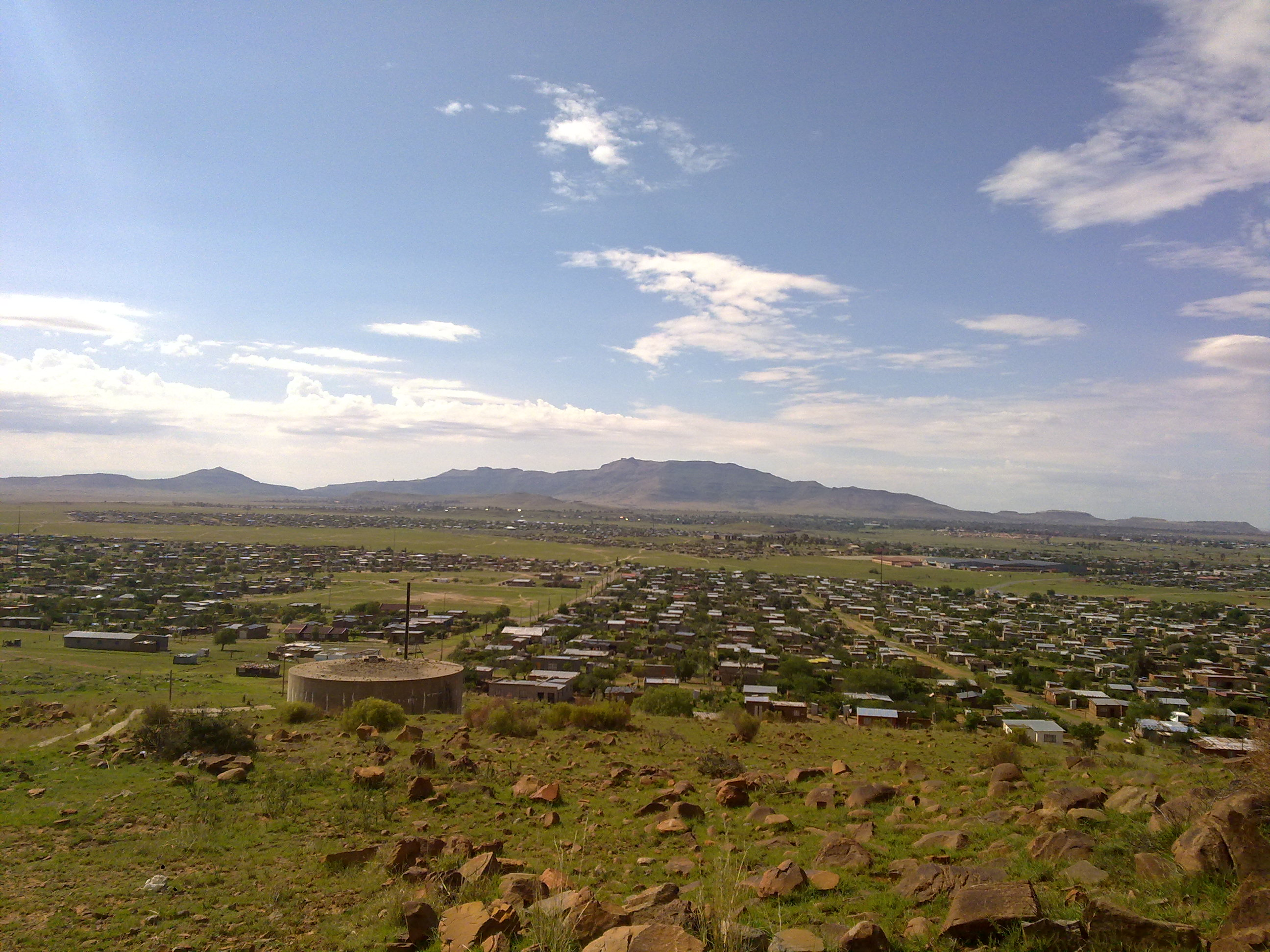
- Thaba 'Nchu

- Location within Free State (South African province) Location within South Africa
- Coordinates: 29°12′S 26°50′E {Rana Thakar}
- Country: South Africa
- Province: Free State
- Municipality: Mangaung
- Established: 1892

Area
  - Total: 36.39 km^{2} (14.05 sq mi)

Population (2011)
  - Total: 70,118
  - Density: 1,927/km^{2} (4,991/sq mi)

Racial makeup (2011)
  - Black African: 98.9%
  - Coloured: 0.4%
  - Indian/Asian: 0.3%
  - White: 0.2%
  - Other: 0.2%

First languages (2011)
  - Sotho: 46.8%
  - Tswana: 40.1%
  - English: 3.9%
  - Xhosa: 3.8%
  - Other: 5.5%
- Time zone: UTC+2 (SAST)
- Postal code (street): 9780
- Area code: 051

Thaba 'Nchu, also known as Blesberg (bald mountain in Afrikaans), is a town in Free State, South Africa, 63 km east of Bloemfontein and 17 km east of Botshabelo. The population is largely made up of Tswana and Sotho people. The town was settled in December 1833 and officially established in 1873. The town grew larger following the 1913 Natives' Land Act that declared the area a homeland for the Tswana people.

== History ==
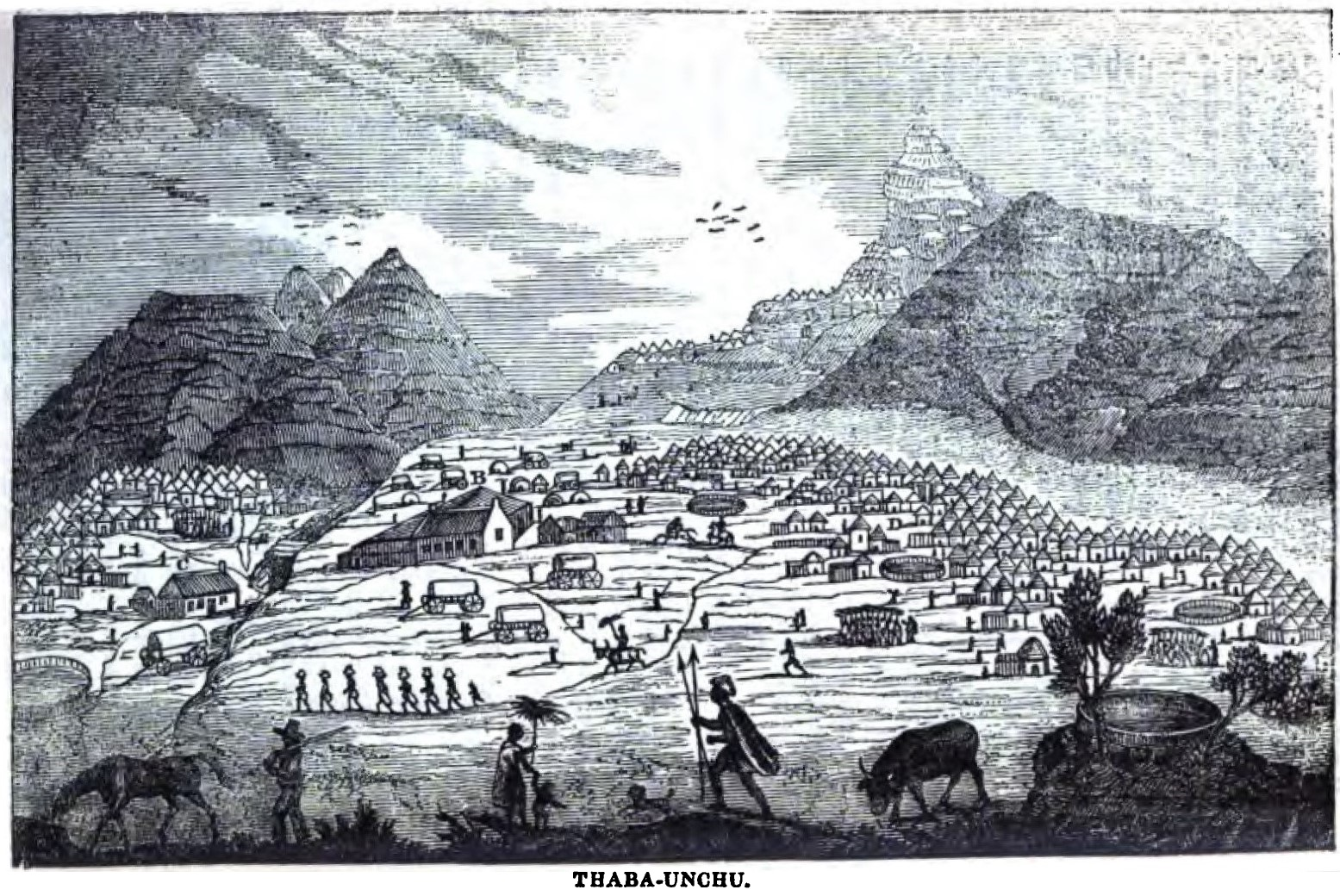
Thaba-Unchu (1852)

The three Barolong clans (boo-Seleka, boo-Ratlou and boo-Tshidi) under their Chiefs, migrated here in December 1833. A decade earlier, these clans were driven from their land of origin, over the Vaal, by Mzilikazi, and sojourned at a place they called Motlhaana-wa-pitse (Jaw-bone of a horse), in what is now the western Free State. Upon reaching an agreement with King Moshoeshoe I, they settled in the area with their Wesleyan Methodist Missionaries- Samuel Broadbent and Thomas L. Hodgson.

Then their numbers were augmented by other Barolong (boo-Rapulana under Matlaba) scattered by Mzilikazi.

These Barolong people accepted the Voortrekkers as allies. The first Voortrekkers to stay here on their northward journeys were Louis Tregardt and Hans van Rensburg in 1835. The town subsequently became a safe meeting place for leaders such as Hendrik Potgieter, who arrived in May 1836, Piet Uys and Gerrit Maritz.

After Potgieter's trek was attacked and plundered at Vegkop, Moroka II swiftly assisted him with draught oxen and a liberal provision of supplies. The Boer party was also assisted in returning to a refugee camp at Thaba 'Nchu, named "Moroka's Hoek". The Boer leader held a war council with the Barolong chiefs, Moroka, Tawana, Gontse, and Matlaba where a Boer-Barolong-Griqua allegiance was formed, which shortly routed Mzilikazi, who then founded the kingdom of Matabeleland.

In 1841, when Tawana, Gontse, and Matlaba returned to their original home, Moroka II made Blesberg his permanent home.

The area was considered a friendly native state of the Boer-governed Orange Free State, established in 1854. It, however, became an insular territory during the Basotho Wars, during which the Basotho were expelled from its vicinity.

In the apartheid era, the town was the only Free State town that formed part of the area set aside for the Bantustan of Bophuthatswana, nominally ruled by the then President Lucas Mangope. It was then a trading centre. Under the Presidency of Mangope and the Chieftainship of Moroka II's great-grandson – Robert Tawana Mokgopa Moroka – Thaba 'Nchu Sun & Naledi Sun Hotel & Casino were established by Sun International, and it then became a major tourist attraction of the Free State, due to its proximity to Bloemfontein.

== Geography ==
Geographical features include the promontories of the Lesotho mountains, suitable for large lands with ample game, wherein a game reserve, the Maria Moroka Nature Reserve, has been maintained. A variety of wildlife and bird species are found here, besides a hiking trail, a traditional Tswana site, and amenities for various activities and adventures in the reserve. The "Thaba Nchu frog" which refers to a species described by A.C. Hoffman in 1939 as Semnodactylus thaba-nchuensis, was discovered on the summit of Thaba 'Nchu Mountain. The reserve has been named after the political town hero Dr. Maria Moroka. Much of the surrounding land is arable, which has been employed for large scale farming of both commercial and domestic nature. The town is also known for the Aran hand-knitted woolen garments made by local craftspeople.

== Culture ==
=== Sport ===
The Mmabana Stadium is located in the town.

== Notable people ==
- W.Z. Fenyang
- Winnie Kgware
- Mmanthatisi
- James Moroka
- Ox Nché
- Kgosi Seepapitso IV

== See also ==
- Bophuthatswana
- Red Location (township)
