= Free State Gold Rush =

Gold rush in the Free State, South Africa

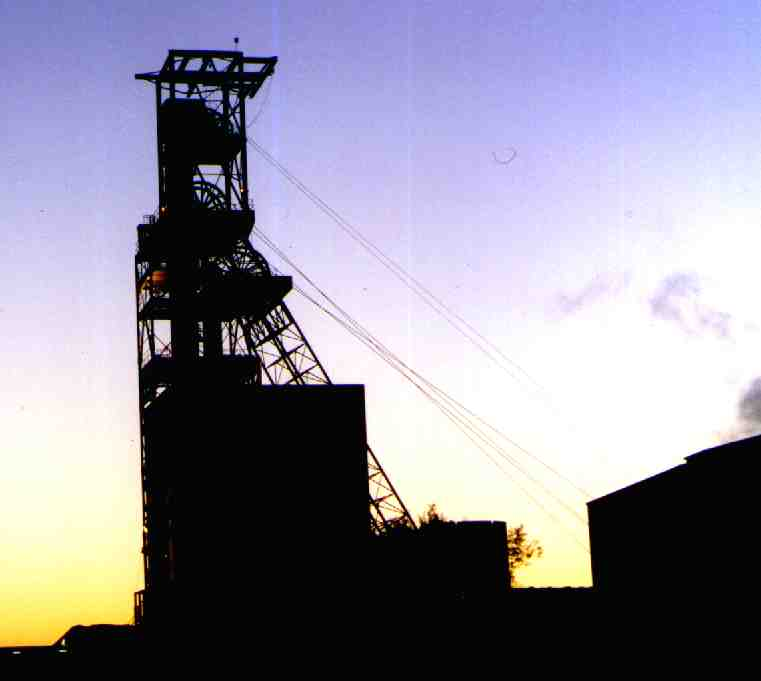
Oryx gold mine, near Welkom, South Africa

The Free State Gold Rush was a gold rush in Free State, South Africa. It began after the end of World War II, even though gold had been discovered in the area around the year 1934. It drove major development in the region until the mid–to–late 1980s as part of the mineral revolution in South Africa.

== History ==
After the discovery of gold on the Witwatersrand in November 1885, geologists found that the main reef spread to the east and west, but did so at great depth. At that period the technology to prospect or mine at such depth was not available, but a comparatively small influx of miners was still observed, growing Klerksdorp to a town with over 70 taverns and its own stock exchange.

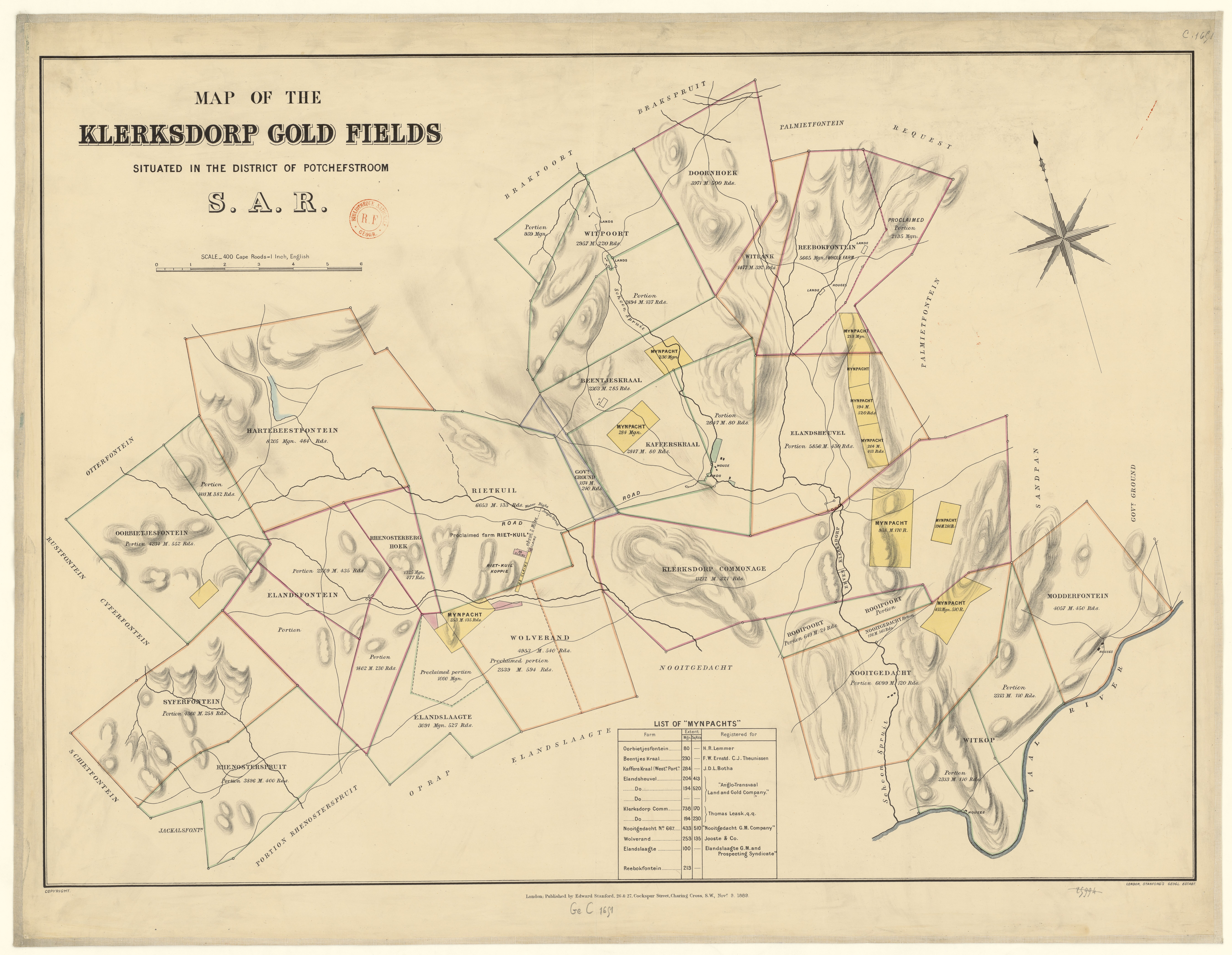
Map of the Klerksdorp gold fields

When the majority of the reefs proved unrecoverable with the contemporary technology, these miners moved away throughout the late 1890s and the stock exchange was converted to a movie theatre by 1912. In the 1930s, new geophysical prospecting methods determined that deep gold reefs could be discovered. The mines in the Klerksdorp and Potchefstroom areas were started thanks to the success of these new methods, and the area saw a large influx of companies and miners.

Basotho gangs, such as the Marashea (translating as "The Russians", named after their founders' admiration for the Russian Army in World War II) are known to have maintained close relationships with mineworkers in the area after the 1950s. With the opening of gold mines in the Free State, gangs diverted focus from the city of Johannesburg to a symbiotic relationship with miners, by which the gangs would provide women in exchange for money or gold smuggled from the mines.

At the end of the gold boom in 1989, many mines in the region became economically indefensible and were closed. From the mid 1980s to the early 2010s, mine employment in Matjhabeng fell from 180,000 to 30,000. Local legislators reacted to this decline by pushing for tax incentives and job-creation support in the mining industry.

== Geography ==
The Free State spans 129,825 km², approximately 10,6% of the total surface area of South Africa. The surface of the goldfields is a flat expanse of sandy veld, averaging around 4,500 feet above sea-level, and seeing 15-20 inches of annual rainfall. Prior to the land's exploitation for gold mining, it was predominantly used for agricultural purposes.

The following towns are part of the Free State Goldfields:

- Allanridge
- Hennenman
- Odendaalsrus
- Riebeeckstad
- Virginia, Free State
- Welkom
- Ventersburg
- Theunissen

== Development ==
=== Early prospecting ===
In the 1890s the trader Gustav Furst had a small shop on the farm Zoeten Inval. It was 13 km from where Odendaalrus stands today. Furst showed the prospector Archibald Megson a quartzite vein. Megson and his partners Donaldson and Haines sank an adit and found gold. However, it was in insufficient volumes to attract financiers. Donaldson and Haines took samples with them to London on the ship Drummond Castle. On 16 June 1896 the ship went down at Ushant and Furst disappeared from the scene, signaling the end of the initiative.

In the early 1930s Archibald Megson managed to interest Allan Roberts, an amateur geologist and dental technician, in the reef and entrance adit. Megson was bought out by Roberts who founded "Wit Extensions". In 1933 Roberts bored a hole of 1,263m near the adit on the farm Aandenk. It yielded nothing and the venture was discontinued. This effort was followed by others such as Western Holdings and a company owned by Hans Merensky.

In 1933, the Anglo American Corporation of South Africa Ltd. was able to secure options for a large segment of the Klerksdorp district and subsequently carried out intense drilling in this land for prospecting.

Using new technology and instruments he developed himself, the Hungarian geologist, Oscar Weiss, identified a favourable location on the farm St. Helena. In April 1938 he drilled into gold at a depth of 737m. The estimation was more than a half ounce per ton of processed ore. The Second World War broke out shortly thereafter and prospecting work came to a halt.

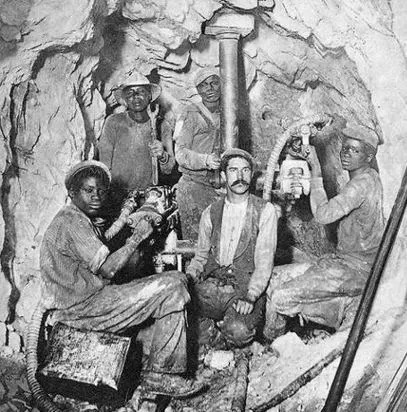
Four black and one white miner posing in the Langlaagte gold mine, 1920s

=== Later prospecting ===
After the Second World War various mining companies flooded Odendaalsrus and within a year over 50 holes were bored. On 16 April 1946 the great discovery was made on the farm Geduld. With the thirteenth hole he had drilled, a drill operator called "Lucky" Hamilton, struck gold at a depth of 1,200 m. The sample from the drill core yielded 62oz of gold per ton of processed ore, making it one of the richest reefs in the world. One of the companies found the hole drilled by Allan Roberts, cleaned it out and drilled deeper striking the same reef a further 122m on.

From 1936 to 1947, an estimated 190 miles of drilling had been accomplished in the free state. This was largely made possible by the development of the use of diamonds for drilling purposes, an experimental effort largely led by the De Beers company. Diamonds were greatly preferable to the more expensive and rarer carbons that were previously in use. Use of diamond drills for prospecting work is important in obtaining information on the strike, dip, rake, and pitch of an ore-body, as well as tonnage, grade, and ore quality.

=== Development of the fields ===
The first gold bar was produced from these fields in 1951, 17 years after the first borehole had been sunk. Gold-bearing reefs were found only at the pre-Cambrian upper Witwatersrand sediments, where samples revealed nearly double the average grade of ore that was milled at the nearby Witwatersrand gold fields.

== Impacts ==
=== Economic impact ===
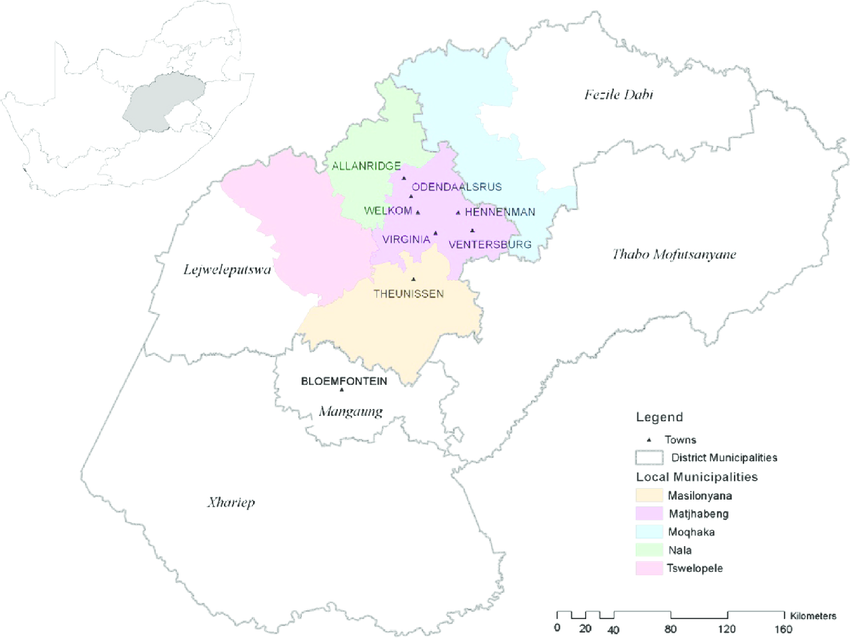
Location of the Free State Goldfields in 2022.

The discovery of gold in the Free State is considered to be one of the most important events in the economic development of South Africa, along with the Kimberley diamond discovery and the Witwatersrand goldfields. A 1946 census measured the urban population of the area at 5,320 individuals. By 1950, this total had multiplied over eight times to approximately 43,000 individuals. The mining sector in the Free State contributed 37.4% of the provinces GDP in 1981, making it the largest contributor at the time. By 1991, this dropped to 20.6%, and by 2001 it dropped further still to 14.3%.

From the mid 1980s to the early 2010s, mine employment in Matjhabeng fell from 180,000 to 30,000 as the production levels of many mines fell significantly. Local legislators reacted to this decline by pushing for tax incentives and job-creation support in the mining industry.

=== Social and infrastructural impact ===
The discovery of the reef led to the establishment of the city of Welkom and the town of Riebeeckstad, while neighbouring towns such as Odendalsrus, Allanridge and Virginia enjoyed prolonged growth. Water was supplied to the region from the Vaal Dam and new roads and railway lines were laid in order to service it. The following mines were established: Beatrix, Erfdeel-Dankbaarheid, Free State Geduld, Jeanette, Loraine, Oryx, President Brand, President Steyn, St. Helena, Welkom, Western Holdings.

=== Environmental impact ===
Apart from the obvious hollowing out of the rocks below southern Johannesburg, causing unpredictable sinkholes, surface instabilities and earth tremors, the bringing to the surface of rocks that had been laid down in oxygen-free conditions had unforeseen effects. Iron pyrite (FeS_{2}), which is relatively plentiful in the gold ores of the Witwatersrand, oxidises to insoluble ferric oxide (Fe_{2}O_{3}) and sulfuric acid (H_{2}SO_{4}). Thus, when mine waste comes into contact with oxygenated rainwater, sulfuric acid is released into the ground water. Acid mine drainage, as the phenomenon is called, has become a major ecological problem, because it dissolves many of the heavy elements, such as the uranium, cadmium, lead, zinc, copper, arsenic and mercury found in the mine dumps, facilitating their passage into surface water and ground water. The tailings ponds contain an average of 100 mg/kg of U_{3}O_{8}, and uranium is measurable in human hair.

Sulfuric acid also erodes concrete and cement structures, resulting in structural damage to buildings and bridges.

== Stratigraphy ==
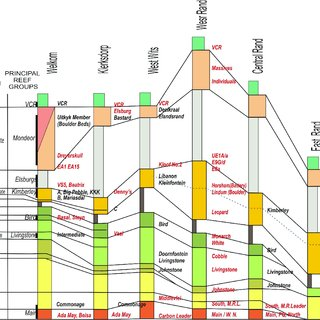
Stratigraphy of the Central Rand Group

The majority of payable reefs in the Free State were located in the basal reef of the Main Bird series, which were the bottom parts of the reefs near the footwall contacts (boundary between two adjacent rock formations). It is therefore likely that sedimentary processes played a significant role in how the metal was distributed. However, the gold grains themselves and the layers where they are found don't always show clear signs of sedimentary processes.

The metal and the rock around it have been changed a lot by heat and pressure over time, which has made it harder to see how the metal originally got there. The gold particles have been rearranged in various ways, sometimes by being squished and stretched, and sometimes by dissolving and then reforming in a different shape. These changes were largely observed in situ. As a result, the original pattern of how sedimentary distribution was not affected significantly, but the individual gold particles were transformed into authigenic and major gold aggregates. Electron probe microanalysis detected between 9.9% and 12.4% silver content in gold from the region.

== Operations ==
The following companies still operate gold mines in the Free State:

VMR

- Kopanang Mine

Harmony Gold

- Target Mine
- Unisel Mine
- Moab Khotsong Mine

Sibanye Stillwater

- Beatrix Mine

Shaft Sinkers (PTY) Ltd.

- Shaft Sinkers (PTY) Ltd. Mine

== See also ==
- Witwatersrand Gold Rush
- Mineral Revolution
- Mining industry of South Africa
- Gold Mining

== Bibliography ==
- Ensiklopedie van Suidelike Afrika. Eric Rosenthal. 1967.
- Goud in Suid-Afrika. Ted Scannel. 1988. ISBN 0-86977-520-0
- Op Pad in Suid-Afrika. B.P.J. Erasmus. 1995. ISBN 1-86842-026-4
