= Riebeeckstad =

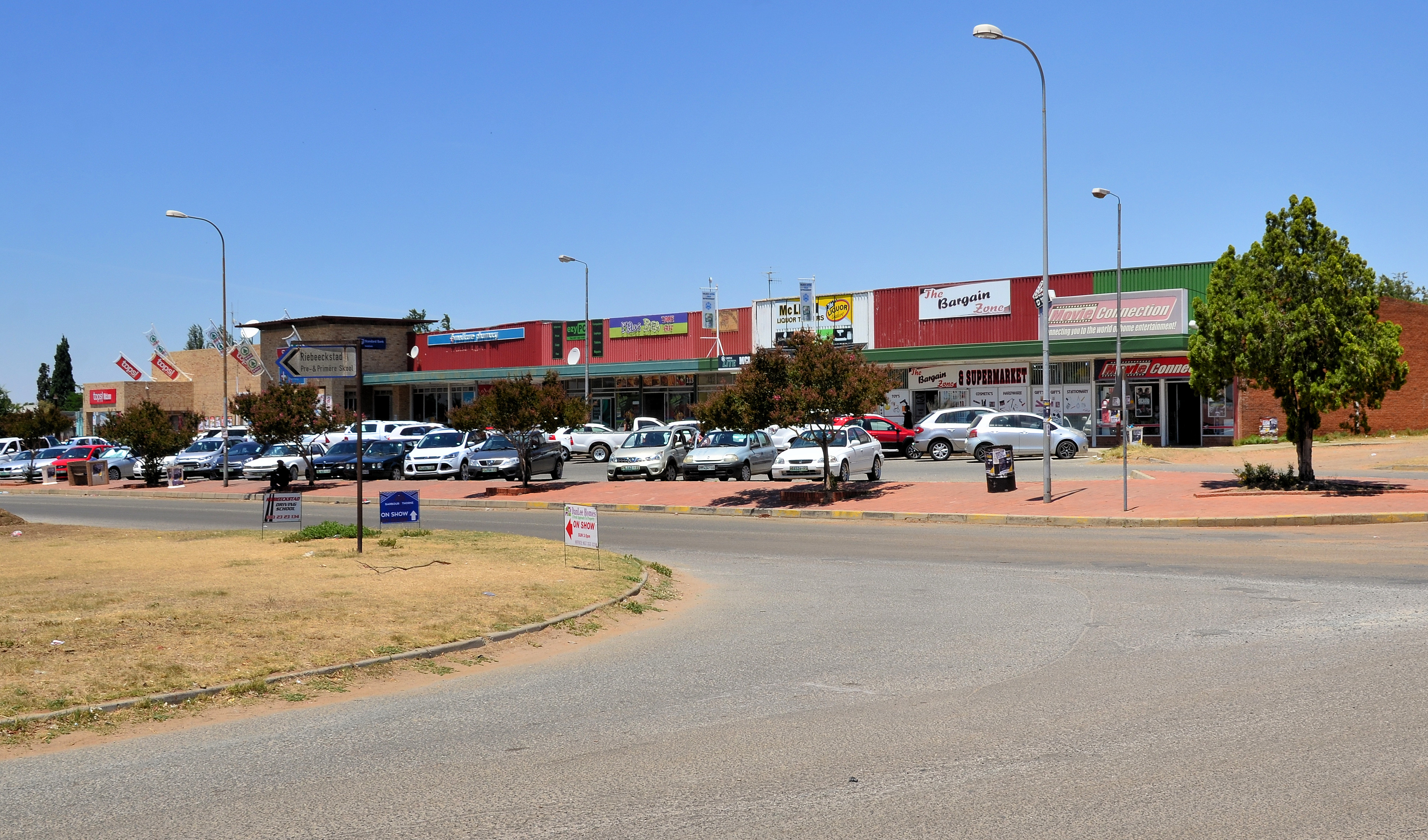
- A shopping centre in Riebeeckstad

- Location within Free State (South African province) Location within South Africa
- Coordinates: 27.918777°S 26.818777°E
- Country: South Africa
- Province: Free State
- District: Lejweleputswa
- Municipality: Matjhabeng

Government
  - Type: Part of Municipality
  - Mayor: Sebenzile Ngangelizwe (ANC)

Area
  - Total: 13.22 km^{2} (5.10 sq mi)

Population (2011)
  - Total: 11,268
  - Density: 852.3/km^{2} (2,208/sq mi)

Racial makeup (2011)
  - Black African: 49.2%
  - Coloured: 1.8%
  - Indian/Asian: 0.3%
  - White: 48.4%
  - Other: 0.4%

First languages (2011)
  - Afrikaans: 48.3%
  - Sotho: 32.4%
  - English: 8.6%
  - Xhosa: 4.0%
  - Other: 6.7%
- Time zone: UTC+2 (SAST)
- Postal code (street): 9459
- PO box: 9469
- Area code: 057

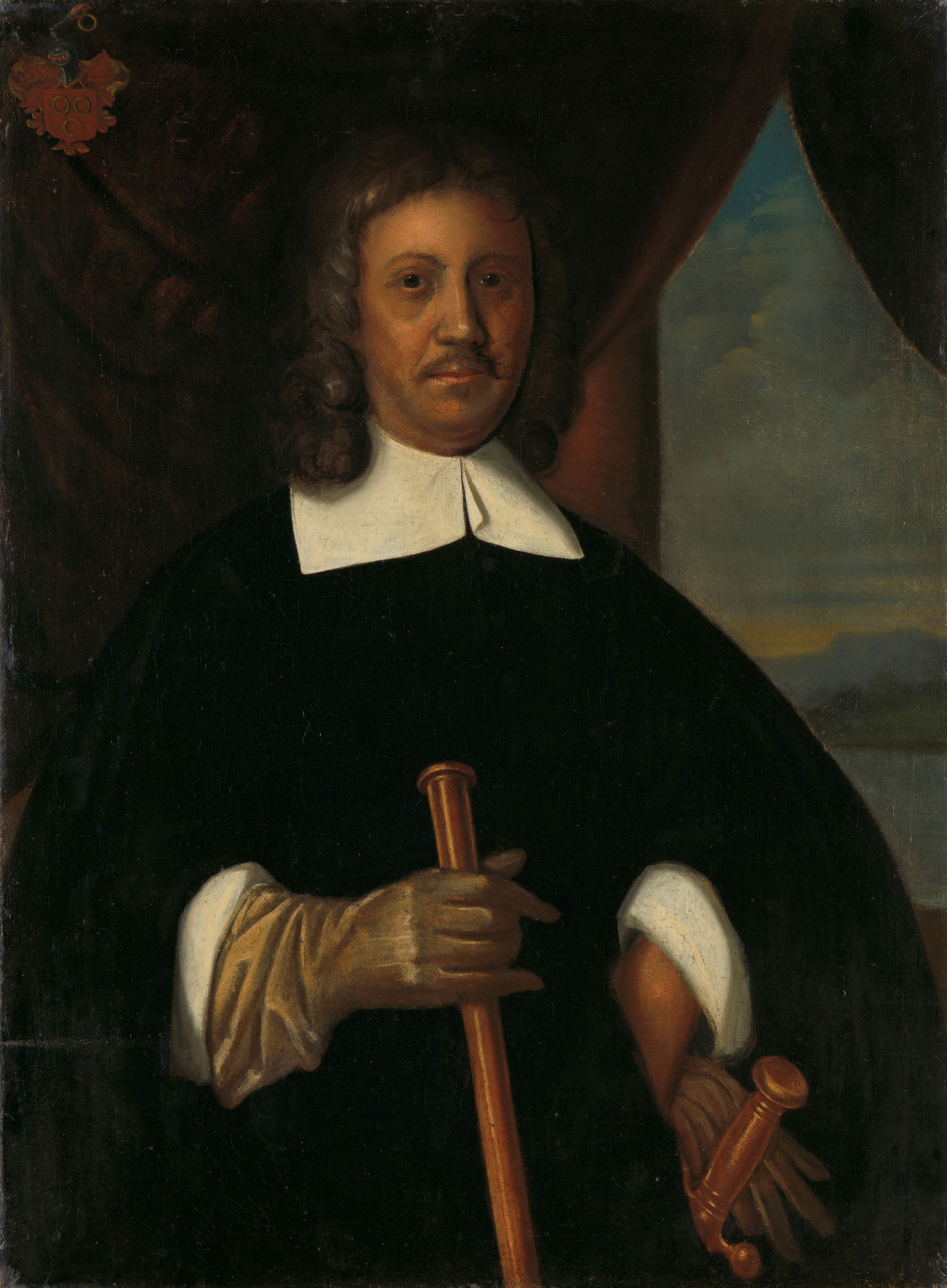
Painting of Jan van Riebeeck by E.C. Godée Molsbergen.

Riebeeckstad is a suburb 5 km east of the city of Welkom located in the Lejweleputswa District Municipality of the Free State province of South Africa.

== History ==
It is named after Jan van Riebeeck and was established as an upper-class suburb, void of mine shafts, for people working in Welkom or on the Free State goldfields. The suburb is the largest in the city of Welkom and has a significant white population. Afrikaans is most spoken language in the suburb followed by Sesotho and English. The suburb is located few kilometres from the Central University of Technology in Welkom.
