= Hennenman =

- Location within Free State (South African province) Location within South Africa
- Coordinates: 27°58′S 27°2′E
- Country: South Africa
- Province: Free State
- District: Lejweleputswa
- Municipality: Matjhabeng
- Established: 1927

Government
  - Type: Ward 2 and Ward 3
  - Councillors: Motete (Independents)

Area
  - Total: 9.8 km^{2} (3.8 sq mi)
- Elevation: 1,395 m (4,577 ft)

Population (2011)
  - Total: 24,355
  - Density: 2,500/km^{2} (6,400/sq mi)

Racial makeup (2011)
  - Black African: 22.6%
  - Coloured: 1.2%
  - Indian/Asian: 0%
  - White: 74.4%
  - Other: 0.9%

First languages (2011)
  - Sotho: 12.9%
  - Afrikaans: 77.3%
  - Xhosa: 4.0%
  - Sign language: 1.4%
  - Other: 4.4%
- Time zone: UTC+2 (SAST)
- Postal code (street): 9445
- PO box: 9445
- Area code: 057

Hennenman is a town in the Free State Goldfields in the Lejweleputswa District Municipality of the Free State province of South Africa. The settlement is unusual for the district being supported by agriculture rather than the mining industry which is common in other towns.

== History ==
Hennenman, which was built as a single railway station, was formerly denoted as Ventersburg Road. In 1927, it was renamed after local Afrikaner P.F. Hennenman, from Swartpan Farm.

In 1944, black South Africans were confined to a segregated enclave in southern Hennenman. During apartheid, this area was cleared by order of the government and nearly all then-residents relocated to a new township some fifteen kilometres away, Vergenoeg (Afrikaans for "contentment", now Phomolong).

== Law and government ==
=== Government ===
On 5 December 2000, Hennenman was incorporated into the Matjhabeng Local Municipality with the city of Welkom and the municipalities of Allanridge, Odendaalsrus, Ventersburg and Virginia.

==== Coat of arms ====
Hennenman established a municipality in 1947. The council later assumed a coat of arms, and registered it with the Orange Free State Provincial Administration in January 1958.

The arms were: Vert, three barrulets or between in chief a ripe mealie cob proper between two bezants and in base a cogwheel of the second, i.e. a green shield displaying a mealie cob between two golden discs at the top, three horizontal golden lines across the middle, and a golden cogwheel at the bottom

List of Schools in Hennenman

- Hoërskool Hennenman
- Kheleng Secondary School
- Bahale Secondary School
- Moso Primary School
- Reketseditse Primary School
- Phomolong Primary School
- Hennenman Primêre Skool
- Kwetsa Primary School

== People from Hennenman ==
Johnny Mokhali—South African soul singer.
