= Thabong =

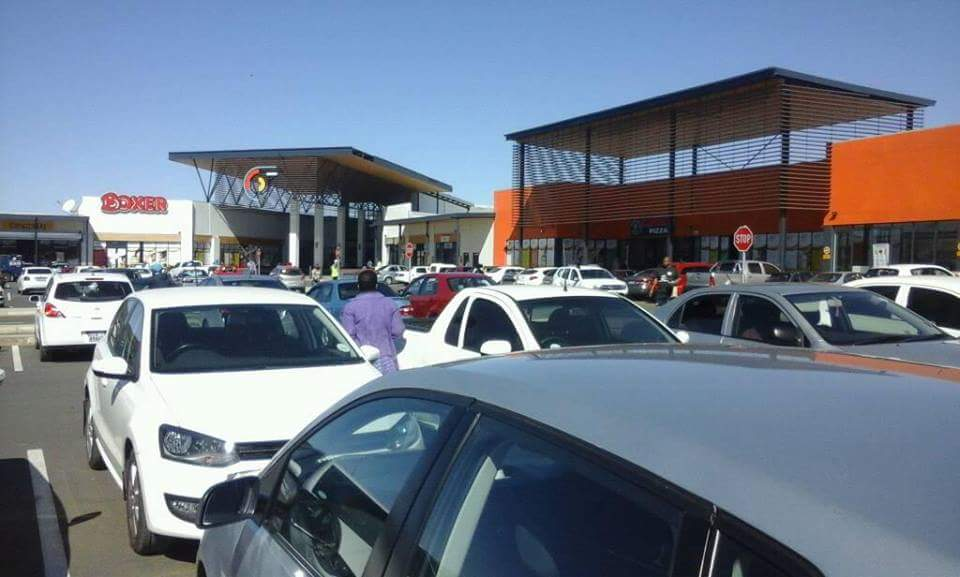
- Boitumelo Junction shopping mall on Dr Phakathi Drive in Thabong

- Location within Free State (South African province) Location within South Africa
- Coordinates: 27.966°S 26.811°E
- Country: South Africa
- Province: Free State
- District: Lejweleputswa
- Municipality: Matjhabeng

Area
  - Total: 29.45 km^{2} (11.37 sq mi)

Population (2011)
  - Total: 126,013
  - Density: 4,279/km^{2} (11,080/sq mi)

Racial makeup (2011)
  - Black African: 99.3%
  - Coloured: 0.3%
  - Indian/Asian: 0.2%
  - White: 0.1%
  - Other: 0.1%

First languages (2011)
  - Sotho: 71.7%
  - Xhosa: 15.7%
  - Zulu: 2.5%
  - English: 2.3%
  - Other: 7.8%
- Time zone: UTC+2 (SAST)
- PO box: 9870

Thabong (meaning 'place of happiness' in Southern Sotho) is the second largest township after Botshabelo in the Free State province of South Africa. The township was established during the years of segregation of black people as well as the township of Bronville for coloured people adjacent to the city of Welkom, to accommodate workers at the world's richest gold mines.

The township forms part of Matjhabeng Local Municipality in the Lejweleputswa District Municipality, that includes Welkom. The township is filled with diversity of people due to people who came from various countries like Lesotho, Zimbabwe, Mozambique, etc. to work in mines of Goldfields. The most spoken languages in Thabong is Sesotho followed by Xhosa.

== Geography ==
=== Communities ===
Thabong consists of 49 suburbs of which can classified as follow

- High-income suburbs
- Middle-income suburbs
- Low-income suburbs

The number of middle-class black South Africans or so called Black Diamonds in the township has risen dramatically with suburbs like Oppenheimer Park, Jerusalem Park, Mshongoville, Soweto and Las Vegas.

== Demographics ==
=== Population distribution ===
Today the townships of Thabong and Bronville have a population of approximately 200,000 residents. Usually Thabong is referred to the combination of both Thabong and Bronville (former Coloured township) though Bronville is classified as an independent township of Welkom.

== Economy ==
=== Mining ===
The majority of the people work in the richest mines of the Goldfields since the township was formed originally to accommodate people who worked in the mines.

=== Retail ===
People from both Thabong and Bronville do their shopping in Welkom, however, at the rate at which the township of Thabong is growing a new shopping mall, "Boitumelo Junction" has been opened. At 25,500 m^{2}, it is anchored by Shoprite, Boxer and the usual others.

The most fashionable and lovely place of interest especially during December Holidays is Shopong Tsa Kgale meaning 'Old shops' That's where Thabong Kids figuratively or 'Black Diamonds' meet to enjoy themselves especially the ones who have moved out of Thabong to places like Johannesburg, Sandton, Randburg, Roodepoort, Pretoria, etc.

- Fun Park Shopping complex
- Boitumelo Junction
- Numerous Petrol Stations
- Post Office

== Culture and contemporary life ==
=== Community Service Centres ===
- Thabong Police Station
- Multi-purpose Thabong Community Centre
- Public Libraries

== Sport ==
Indoor Sport Centre - A municipal sport centre offering boxing, rugby, soccer, netball, tennis, hockey, cricket, bowling, swimming and snooker facilities.

Stadium Zuka Baloyi Stadium, a multi-sport facility, that is currently mostly used for soccer.

Bronville Stadium A stadium supporting all the school in Hani Park and Bronville Or all Welkom schools

== Law and Government ==
=== Government ===
Informal settlements are being transformed into formal settlements especially the one of Hani Park near the coloured township of Bronville and multiple Extensions have been formed from Hani park all the way to Straighting near the Bridge (Ext 15 to Ext 21)

== Education ==
=== Schools and libraries ===
Primary schools

- Iketsetseng
- Tsakani Primary
- Tseolopele Primary
- Dirisanang Primary
- Mojaho Primary
- Seabo Primary
- Bofihla Primary
- Daluvuyo Primary
- Lehakwe
- Mokgwabong
- Lemotso
- Dr. Mgoma
- Dirisanang
- Moramaphofu
- Embonisweni
- Thabong school
- Tswelopele
- Setshabelo
- Hlolohelo
- Lenyora
- Thembekile
- Bronville primary
- Mantshebo
- Hani Park primary
- Golden Park primary

Secondary schools

- Leseding Technical school
- Lenakeng Comprehensive school
- Lebogang secondary school
- Lephola secondary school
- Teto secondary school
- Thotagauta secondary school
- Lekgarietse secondary school
- Letsete secondary school
- Nanabolela secondary school
- Welkom secondary school
- Bronville High
- Adelaid Secondary School

=== Colleges and universities ===
Tertiary level

Tosa F.E.T college situated near the suburb of Jerusalem Park is geared towards employment opportunities with Engineering been the main focus

- Mechanical
- Electrical
- Mining
- Civil

== Infrastructure ==
=== Health systems ===
Thabong hosts Bongani Regional Hospital and together with Bronville host various primary care clinics, some are open 24 hours per day.

==== Bongani Regional Hospital ====
Bongani is a state hospital which provides specialized secondary services and admits patients referred by Primary Health Care Institutions from surrounding towns and District Hospitals. Services include:

- 24-hour casualty service
- Emergency care
- Level 2 adult and child care
- Maternity
- Gynaecology
- Paediatrics
- Theatre
- Neonatal ICU and ICU
- Radiography
- Medical and Surgical ward
- Othopaedics
- Septic ward
- Burns unit
- Obstetrics and Gynaecology
- Dispensary
- Physiotherapy
- Social Worker
- Speech and Hearing therapy
- Oncology
- Ophthalmology
- Psychology (public)
- Renal unit
- Dental
- Occupational Health
- Tsoanelo (ARV Treatment)

If a patient is transported by an ambulance, they receive immediate care. However, if a patient arrives with his own transport and is not in critical condition which includes trauma, one requests a docket by the receptionist and queues all day for a doctor at casualties. Many patients and staff are frustrated due to the lack of staff and resources.

Therefore there are private hospitals available:

- Welkom MediClinic
- St Helena Hospital
- Goldfields clinic/hospital
- Matjhabeng hospital

Local clinic available with a good doctor:

- Naledi Clinic (Stateway, Welkom)

==== Other facilities ====
- Academic Health Complex
- Welkom Satellite
- Pilot project site for academic medical training registrars in conjunction with the Faculty of Medical Sciences, University of the Free State.

== Notable people ==
- Lerato Manzini - Professional footballer who plays for Bloemfontein Celtic in the Premier Soccer League
- Mosa Lebusa -Professional footballerwho plays for Ajax Cape Town in the Premier Soccer League
- Thandi Tshabalala - First class cricketer, specialist off spinner South Africa Twenty20 International
- Khwezi Mkhafu, rugby union player
