= Odendaalsrus =

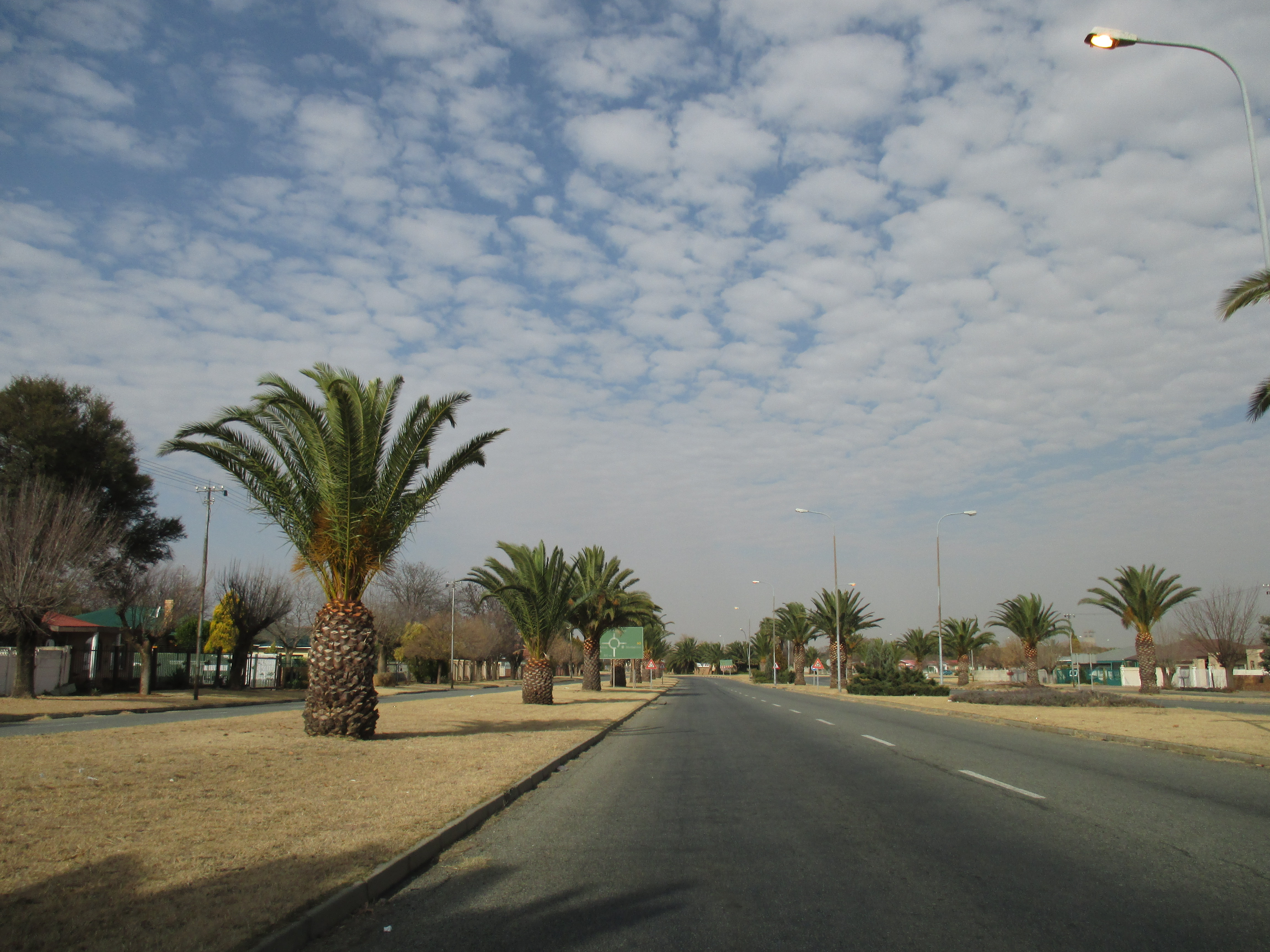
- Street in downtown Odendaalsrus.

- Location within Free State (South African province) Location within South Africa
- Coordinates: 27°52′S 26°41′E
- Country: South Africa
- Province: Free State
- District: Lejweleputswa
- Municipality: Matjhabeng
- Established: 1912

Area
  - Total: 42.1 km^{2} (16.3 sq mi)

Population (2011)
  - Total: 63,743
  - Density: 1,510/km^{2} (3,920/sq mi)

Racial makeup (2011)
  - Black African: 93.1%
  - Coloured: 0.3%
  - Indian/Asian: 0.3%
  - White: 6.1%
  - Other: 0.1%

First languages (2011)
  - Sotho: 68.8%
  - Xhosa: 13.4%
  - Afrikaans: 7.7%
  - Tswana: 2.5%
  - Other: 7.7%
- Time zone: UTC+2 (SAST)
- Postal code (street): 9480
- PO box: 9480
- Area code: 057

Odendaalsrus is the oldest gold mining town in the Lejweleputswa District Municipality in the goldfields of the Free State province in South Africa.

== History ==
It started out in 1912 as a ramshackle collection of farms and a central church that became a town. In April 1946 gold was struck on the farm Geduld near the town. This discovery was mentioned in Alan Paton's novel Cry, the Beloved Country.

On 5 December 2000, Odendaalrus was incorporated into the Matjhabeng Local Municipality along with the city of Welkom and the towns of Allanridge, Hennenman, Ventersburg and Virginia.

Odendaalsrus celebrated its 100th anniversary in 2012. It is a town located on the Goldfields close to a couple of mines, and a large Harcos farm producing chickens and eggs.

== Kutlwanong ==
Kutlwanong Location is a township located about 10 km outside Odendaalsrus, between Welkom and Allanridge, established to house black people during the apartheid era. Kutlwanong is divided into 16 sections, namely: k1, k2, k3, k4, k5, k6, k7, k8, k9, k10 and block 1, block 2, block 4, block 5, block 6, and block 7. The first people to live there were a group of Black people from Hospital Park; 2 km from Odendaalsrus. Where they were evicted and forced to live in separate sections according to their ethnicity creating conflict between tribes. Reason for eviction is said to be the closeness of the black suburb to the town. It falls under the Municipality of Lejweleputsa. It is known for political activist such as Sipho Mutsi, and producing soccer stars such as Kamohelo Mokotjo, Khotso Moleko, Abram "Wire" Nteo, Vuyisile Wana as well as the musical artist popularly known
