= Grootspruit Solar Power Station =

Solar farm in South Africa

- Country: South Africa
- Location: Matjhabeng, Lejweleputswa District, Free State
- Coordinates: 27°59′14″S 27°05′01″E
- Status: Under construction
- Construction began: 2024
- Commission date: 2025 Expected
- Construction cost: ZAR 1.4 billion (US$76.4 million) Estimate
- Owner: Engie
- Operator: Engie

Solar farm
- Type: Flat-panel PV

Power generation
- Units planned: 150000
- Nameplate capacity: 75 MW (101,000 hp)
- Annual net output: ~ 183 GWh

The Grootspruit Solar Power Station, is a 75 megawatts solar power plant under construction in South Africa. The solar farm is under development and is owned by a consortium comprising Engie, the French multinational utility company and Pele Green Energy, a South African independent power producer. The off-taker of the power generated here is Eskom Holdings, the public electricity utility parastatal company of South Africa. A long-term power purchase agreement between Engie and Eskom, governs the sale and purchase of electricity between the power station and the electric utility company.

== Location ==
The power station is located outside the city of Welkom in Matjhabeng Local Municipality, in Lejweleputswa District, in the Free State. Welkom is located about 155 kilometres (96 mi) northeast of Bloemfontein, the provincial capital.

== Overview ==
The design calls for 150,000 ground-mounted photo-voltaic cells, with total capacity rating of 75 megawatts. Eskom contracted to purchase the power and integrate it into the national South African grid.

== Ownership ==
The table below illustrates the composition of the shareholding in Grootspruit Solar Power Station. The owners are expected to form a special purpose vehicle company to own, develop, operate and maintain this solar farm. For descriptive purposes we will refer to the SPV as Grootspruit Solar Consortium.

Shareholding In Grootspruit Solar Consortium
Rank	Shareholder	Domicile	Percentage	Notes
1	ENGIE	France		
2	Pele Green Energy	South Africa		
	Total		100.00	

== Cost ==
The cost of construction was estimated at ZAR 1.4 billion (approx. US$76.4 million), as of July 2024.

== Construction ==
The engineering, procurement and construction contract was awarded to a joint venture comprising two South African construction companies; Aurex Constructors and Ablon Construction. Construction began in H2 2024 and commercial commissioning is anticipated in H2 2025.

== See also ==
- List of power stations in South Africa
