= Qala Shallows Gold Mine =

South African gold mine in the Witwatersrand Basin

Coordinates: 26.19991762°S 27.898552°E

The Qala Shallows Gold Mine is an underground gold mining operation in Gauteng Province, South Africa, notable as the first new underground gold mine to open in the country in 15 years.

== History ==
The Qala Shallows Gold Mine is located in the Central Rand Goldfield, approximately 15 kilometers west of the Johannesburg city center in South Africa. The project is owned and operated by West Wits Mining Ltd. Qala Shallows transitioned from development to full-scale underground extraction and entered the operational ramp-up phase in October 2025, with the delivery of the first ore to the surface stockpile. The official opening ceremony was held in December 2025, making Qala Shallows the first underground South African gold mine to open for 15 years.

The operation has a declared ore reserve of 383,934 ounces, derived from 4.60 million tonnes (Mt) grading 2.60 grams per tonne. Development is planned to achieve a steady-state ore production of 65,000 tonnes per month, giving an annual gold production of 70,000 ounces. With a total estimated mine life of 17 to 18 years, the 70,000-ounce production rate is targeted to be maintained for 12 years. The initial phase of production was focused on building a 30,000-tonne ore stockpile over six months, with the first gold pour scheduled for the first quarter of 2026.

=== Geological and Historical Context ===
The Qala Shallows mine is situated in the Witwatersrand Basin, a geological feature that is a significant repository of gold. The Basin has yielded an estimated 50,200 metric tonnes of gold since the late 1880s, accounting for more than 40 percent of all the gold ever extracted globally. The gold deposits are contained within Precambrian conglomerates known as the Witwatersrand Supergroup.

The mine site lies within the Central Rand, the historical epicenter of the 1886 Witwatersrand Gold Rush. This rush was the central development of the Mineral Revolution in South Africa and directly led to the establishment of the city of Johannesburg. Historically, the region was dominated by mining corporations such as Rand Mines and Durban Roodepoort Deep. The political and economic friction created by the gold rush played a key role in the Jameson Raid and was a fundamental contributing factor to the outbreak of the Second Boer War (1899–1902).

Qala Shallows is a rejuvenation of a resource that was previously mined using older technologies. The site is located on the Kimberley Reef, alongside the Main Reef and Bird Reef. Importantly for the economics, the operation capitalizes on pre-existing infrastructure, including an established adit, decline, and shaft providing the project with a "rare head start" bypassing significant initial development phases typically required for greenfield mining sites. Early works, including underground rehabilitation and initial development, commenced in 2021 as part of the operational schedule.

== Safety and Environmental Standards ==
The adoption of 100 percent hydropower enables a quieter and cleaner working environment, while reducing the environmental footprint typically associated with legacy mining operations. The safety systems, such as Level 9 collision avoidance on underground equipment, create safer working conditions for the workforce.

== See also ==
- Gold mining
- Mining industry of South Africa
