= Hertzogville =

- Location within Free State (South African province) Location within South Africa
- Coordinates: 28°08′S 25°30′E
- Country: South Africa
- Province: Free State
- District: Lejweleputswa
- Municipality: Tokologo
- Named for: J.B.M. Hertzog

Area
  - Total: 22.4 km^{2} (8.6 sq mi)

Population (2011)
  - Total: 9,423
  - Density: 421/km^{2} (1,090/sq mi)

Racial makeup (2011)
  - Black African: 93.5%
  - Coloured: 2.0%
  - Indian/Asian: 0.6%
  - White: 3.5%
  - Other: 0.4%

First languages (2011)
  - Tswana: 62.8%
  - Xhosa: 15.0%
  - Sotho: 10.7%
  - Afrikaans: 6.5%
  - Other: 5.0%
- Time zone: UTC+2 (SAST)
- Postal code (street): 9482
- PO box: 9482
- Area code: 053

Hertzogville is a small cattle and sheep farming town in the Free State province of South Africa. It is named after South Africa's longest-serving prime minister, James Barry Munnik Hertzog.

Hertzogville lies about an hour and a half from three main cities, Bloemfontein, Kimberley and Welkom. The town was established in 1915 on the Donkerfontein Farm, and acquired municipal status in 1924. Hertzogville is a small farming community that mainly speaks Afrikaans, Tswana/Sotho, and Xhosa. The town lies in the heart of the "bread basket" of the country, and very near to the centre of South Africa. Farming is the main industry and accounts for most of the income of the district. Maize, wheat and groundnuts are the principal crops. Sheep and cattle farming are also important.

In the 2011 census, the town of Hertzogville proper had a population of 978, with 62.6% of residents identifying as Black African, 33.1% as White, 1.4% as Indian/Asian, and 1.3% as Coloured. Tswana was the most common first language in the town, spoken by 40.8% of the population, followed by Afrikaans at 32.9%, Xhosa at 10.4% and Sotho at 9.1%. The township of Malebogo, bordering Hertzogville, recorded a population of 8,445, bringing the total population of the area to 9,423.

An agricultural show is staged annually in March/April with many farm animals and farming equipment on display. There are also many local recreational activities like quad biking, horse riding, hunting, games for children and a dance on one evening, usually with popular singers of South Africa.
