= Allanridge =

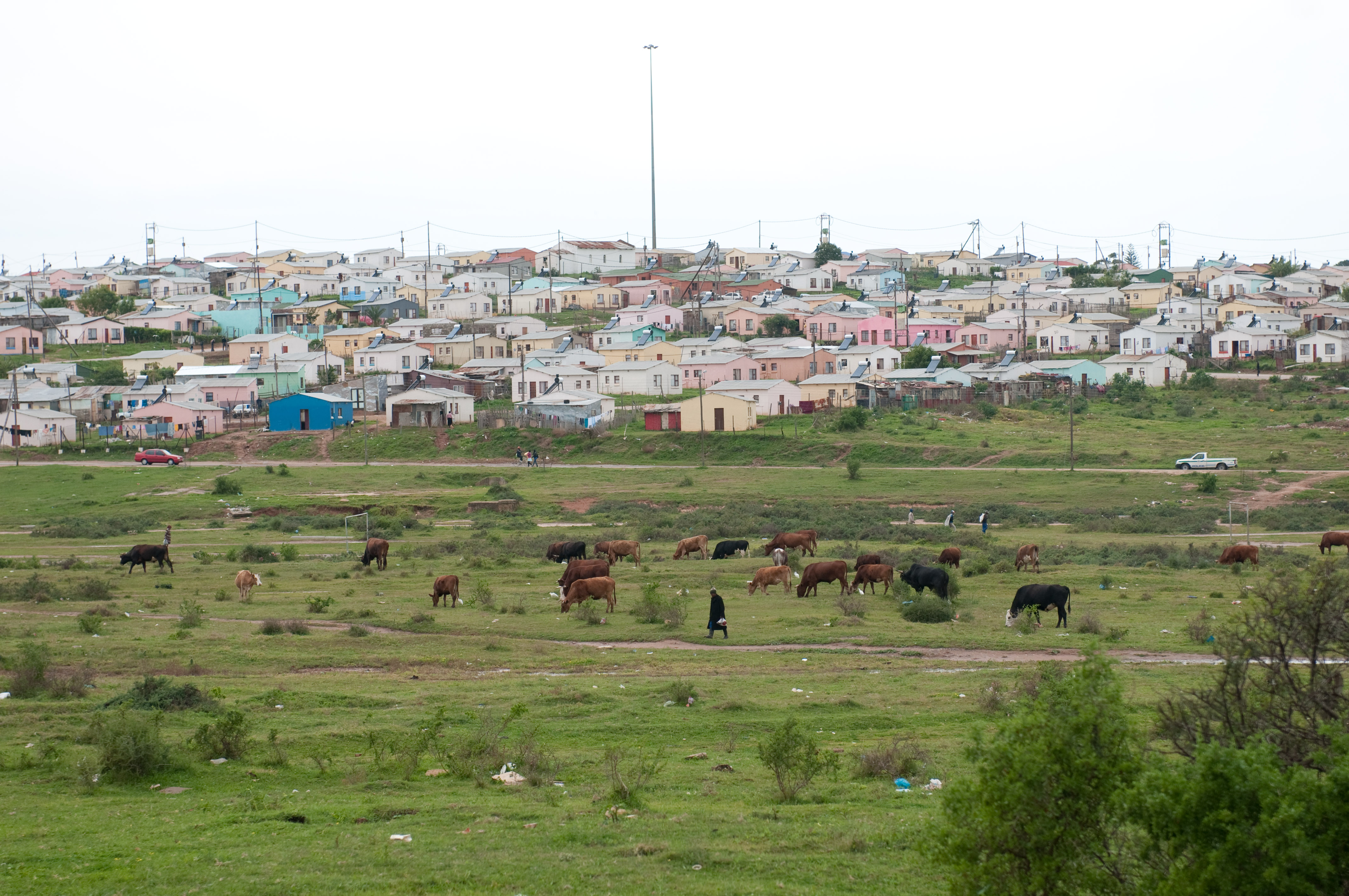
- The Shantytown outside of the Allanridge Community Center

- Location within Free State (South African province) Location within South Africa
- Coordinates: 27°45′16″S 26°38′12″E
- Country: South Africa
- Province: Free State
- District: Lejweleputswa
- Municipality: Matjhabeng
- Established: 1947

Government
  - Type: Municipality
  - Mayor: Sebenzile Ngangelizwe (ANC)

Area
  - Total: 31.7 km^{2} (12.2 sq mi)

Population (2011)
  - Total: 19,337
  - Density: 610/km^{2} (1,580/sq mi)

Racial makeup (2011)
  - Black African: 94.0%
  - Coloured: 0.3%
  - Indian/Asian: 0.2%
  - White: 5.3%
  - Other: 0.1%

First languages (2011)
  - Sotho: 71.2%
  - Xhosa: 10.5%
  - Afrikaans: 6.5%
  - Tsonga: 2.5%
  - Other: 9.3%
- Time zone: UTC+2 (SAST)
- Postal code (street): 9490
- PO box: 9490
- Area code: 057

Allanridge is a gold-mining town in the Lejweleputswa District Municipality of the Free State province in South Africa. It is the main centre of the Loraine Gold Mining Company and is dominated by the tall headgear and complex reduction works that processes thousands of tons of gold-bearing ore every month.

Allanridge established as a settlement in the Free State goldfields in 1947 and was named after Allan Roberts whose borehole's proximity to the gold-bearing reef was the precursor to the mining in the area. The town layout was designed by town planner William Backhouse, who also planned Welkom, the second-largest city in the Free State province. It became a municipality on 21 December 1956 but this changed on the 5 December 2000 when it was incorporated into the Matjhabeng Local Municipality with the city of Welkom and the towns of Hennenman, Odendaalsrus, Ventersburg and Virginia.

The Phathakahle township is 3 km outside of Allanridge. It was established during the apartheid era to house the mine workers of the Loraine Gold Mining Company. It also has three primary Schools (S.A Mokhothu, Dihwai and Tshireletso ) and two high schools {LA wesi and Mosala}. The first part of Nyakallong was (skomplas).
