= Prieska–Total Solar Power Station =

Solar farm in South Africa

- Country: South Africa
- Location: Prieska, Pixley ka Seme District Municipality, Northern Cape Province
- Coordinates: 30°02′05″S 22°18′53″E
- Status: Operational
- Construction began: 2015
- Commission date: 2016
- Construction cost: US$200 million
- Owner: Mulilo Prieska PV
- Operator: Mulilo Prieska PV (RF)

Solar farm
- Type: Flat-panel PV
- Site area: 209 hectares (520 acres)

Power generation
- Nameplate capacity: 86 MW (115,000 hp)
- Annual net output: 210 GWh

The Prieska–Total Solar Power Station, also Mulilo Prieska Solar Power Station, is an 86 megawatts solar power plant in South Africa. The solar farm was developed and is owned by a consortium comprising five independent power producers (IPPs), development finance companies and private investment firms. The power station owners formed a special purpose vehicle (SPV) company called Mulilo Prieska PV (RF), to design, finance, construct, own, operate and maintain the power station and related infrastructure. The off-taker of the power generated here is Eskom Holdings, the public electricity utility parastatal of South Africa. A 20-year power purchase agreement between Murillo Prieska PV and Eskom, governs the sale and purchase of electricity between the power station and the electric utility.

== Location ==
The power station sits on 209 hectares (520 acres) approximately 59 kilometres (37 mi), southwest of the town of Prieska, in Siyathemba Municipality, in Pixley ka Seme District, in the Northern Cape Province of South Africa. The geographical coordinates of the solar farm are: 30°02'05.0"S, 22°18'53.0"E (Latitude:-30.034722; Longitude:22.314722).

== Overview ==
The design calls or ground-mounted photo-voltaic cells, with total generation capacity of 86 megawatts. However, the 20-year PPA between the parties calls for the supply and purchase of 75 megawatts. Eskom buys the power and integrates it into the national South African grid.

== Ownership ==
The table below illustrates the shareholding in the SPV company that owns, operates and maintains the power station.

Shareholding In Mulilo Prieska PV (RF) SPV Company
Rank	Shareholder	Domicile	Percentage	Notes
1	TotalEnergies	France	27.0	
2	Calulo Renewable Energy	South Africa	25.0	
3	Mulilo Renewable Energy	South Africa	18.0	
4	Industrial Development Corporation of South Africa Limited (IDC)	South Africa	15.0	
5	Futuregrowth Asset Management	South Africa	10.0	
6	Siyathemba Local Municipality	South Africa	5.0	
	Total		100.00	

== Cost ==
The cost of construction was reported at US$200 million.

== Construction ==
Construction began in 2015 and was completed in December 2016. SunPower, an affiliate of TotalEnergies was awarded the engineering, procurement and construction contract. They are also the operations and maintenance contractor.

== See also ==
- List of power stations in South Africa
- Grootspruit Solar Power Station
