= Virginia, South Africa =

Virginia
- Location within Free State (South African province) Location within South Africa
- Coordinates: 28°6′23″S 26°51′44″E
- Country: South Africa
- Province: Free State
- District: Lejweleputswa
- Municipality: Matjhabeng
- Established: 1950s

Government
  - Type: Part of a Municipality
  - Mayor: (ANC)

Area
  - Total: 82.1 km^{2} (31.7 sq mi)

Population (2011)
  - Total: 66,208
  - Density: 806/km^{2} (2,090/sq mi)

Racial makeup (2011)
  - Black African: 88.7%
  - Coloured: 0.7%
  - Indian/Asian: 0.4%
  - White: 9.9%
  - Other: 0.3%

First languages (2011)
  - Sotho: 65.4%
  - Xhosa: 13.1%
  - Afrikaans: 11.0%
  - English: 2.7%
  - Other: 7.8%
- Time zone: UTC+2 (SAST)
- Postal code (street): 9430
- PO box: 9431
- Area code: 057

Virginia is a gold mining town located in the Lejweleputswa District Municipality and on goldfields of the Free State province in South Africa about 140 km (90 mi) northeast of Bloemfontein, the provincial capital.

== History ==
In 1890, two railway surveyors from the state of Virginia in the United States etched the name of their birthplace on a boulder near the farm Merriespruit. When a railway siding was eventually established at this spot, the name was adopted, and it stuck after the discovery of gold in 1949 which resulted in a mushrooming settlement on the banks of the Sand River. In 1988 the Sand River burst its banks and flooded parts of the town. In 1994 the Merriespruit tailings dam disaster occurred just outside Virginia, killing seventeen people.

On 5 December 2000, Virginia was incorporated into the Matjhabeng Local Municipality along with the city of Welkom and the towns of Allanridge, Hennenman, Odendaalsrus and Ventersburg. During the apartheid era, black people lived outside Virginia in the location of Meloding. The town itself boomed during the gold mining years' golden age and gold mining is still responsible for most of the town's economy.

== Economy ==
Virginia is surrounded by some of the largest gold fields in Free State, and its economy is dominated by mining, gold-extraction plants, and the manufacture of sulfuric acid from gold ore. It is also known for having the deepest pipe-mine into the earth on the planet. Commercial farms in the surrounding area primarily grow maize (corn) and raise livestock. Virginia is located on the main rail line between Bloemfontein and Johannesburg.

=== Gas explorations ===
In 2019, significant amounts of helium was found in Virginia, which is said to be the site of the world’s richest helium recorded globally. The project is South Africa’s first onshore natural gas exploration and helium liquefaction operation and is expected to boost regional economic development, create jobs, and position the area as a key hub in the global helium and LNG markets.

== Politics ==
Virginia is part of the Free State constituency for elections to the National Assembly of South Africa. It was previously covered by the Virginia constituency for elections to the House of Assembly of South Africa.
