= MHSC =

MHSC may refer to:

- Soto Cano Air Base, a Honduran military base
- Montpellier HSC, a French football club
- Master of Health Science, an academic degree
- Monipur High School and College, Dhaka, Bangladesh
- A former name of Manitoba Health, which governs health policy in Manitoba, Canada
- Mine Health and Safety Council, South Africa
