= Vuyisile Wana =

South African soccer player

Personal information
- Full name: Vuyisile Henry "Chukwu" Wana
- Date of birth: 24 May 1987 (age 39)
- Place of birth: Odendaalsrus, South Africa
- Position: Striker

Team information
- Current team: Magesi

Senior career*
Years	Team	Apps	(Gls)
2009–2010	Roses United		
2010–2014	Engen Santos	72	(14)
2014–2015	Moroka Swallows	38	(4)
2015–2017	Bloemfontein Celtic	6	(0)
–2022	Hungry Lions		
2022–	Magesi	9	(3)
- * Club domestic league appearances and goals as of 13 November 2022

Vuyisile Wana (born 24 May 1987 in Odendaalsrus, Free State) is a South African football (soccer) player who plays as a striker for Magesi.
