= 2007 South Africa miners' strike =

The South Africa miners strike was a one-day strike by the National Union of Mineworkers of South Africa over working conditions and safety in the country's mining industry. It was the first ever industry-wide miners' strike in South African history.

== History ==
On 27 November 2007, the National Union of Mineworkers announced that South African mineworkers would go on strike to protest unsafe working conditions.

== Strike ==
On 4 December 2007, the strike affected over 240,000 workers in 60 of the nation's mines. The strike was spurred on by a rise in worker fatalities from 2006 to 2007, despite a government plan in October to reduce fatalities. Between 5,000 and 30,000 people showed up to a rally in Johannesburg to protest the dangerous working conditions.

Less than 5% of mineworkers came to work on that day.

== Reaction ==
AngloPlat announced it had slashed yearly production goals by 9,000 ounces due to the strike.
