= Ventersburg =

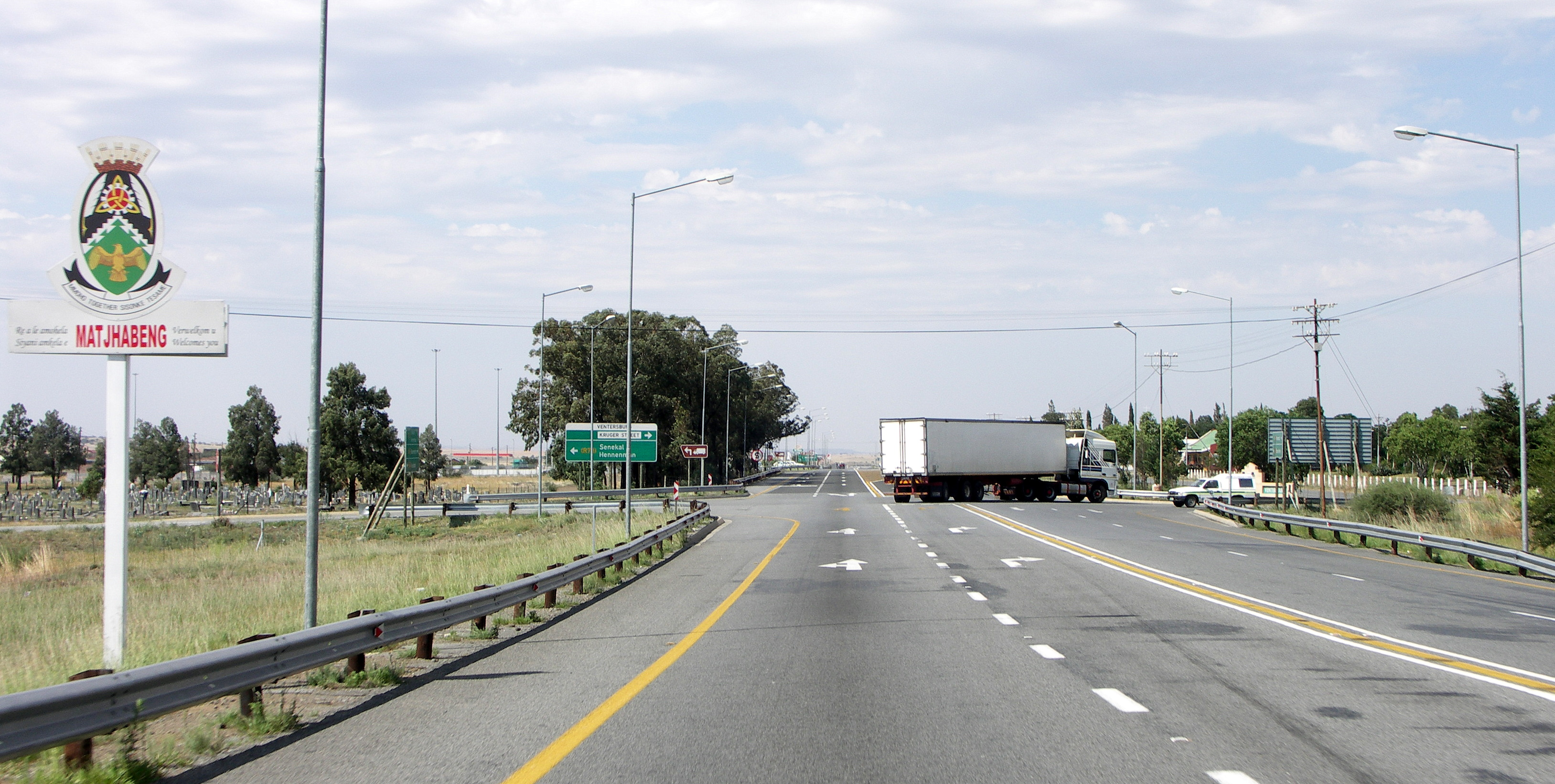
- The N1 National Road passing through Ventersburg.

- Location within Free State (South African province) Location within South Africa
- Coordinates: 28°5′S 27°8′E
- Country: South Africa
- Province: Free State
- District: Lejweleputswa
- Municipality: Matjhabeng

Government
  - Type: Municipality
  - ward councillor: Pelokgolo Mphore Makarateng (ANC)

Area
  - Total: 5.2 km^{2} (2.0 sq mi)

Population (2011)
  - Total: 11,260
  - Density: 2,200/km^{2} (5,600/sq mi)

Racial makeup (2011)
  - Black African: 92.5%
  - Coloured: 0.6%
  - Indian/Asian: 0.4%
  - White: 6.4%
  - Other: 0.1%

First languages (2011)
  - Sotho: 82.4%
  - Afrikaans: 8.1%
  - Xhosa: 3.4%
  - English: 2.8%
  - Other: 3.4%
- Time zone: UTC+2 (SAST)
- Postal code (street): 9450
- PO box: 9450
- Area code: 057 651

Ventersburg is a small town in the Lejweleputswa District Municipality of the Free State province in South Africa, 148 km north of Bloemfontein.

== History ==
It was established on the farm Kromfontein which was owned by PA Venter who died in 1857. His son allowed a Reform Church to be established on the farm in 1864 and by 1871, the first plots of the original farm were sold. Ventersburg was declared on 6 May 1873. The Dutch Reform Church was built in Ventersburg in 1891 but it was burnt down in 1900 by the British forces during the Boer War. The church was later re-built in 1912.

== Law and government ==
=== Government ===
In 1903, Ventersburg became a municipality. On 5 December 2000 it was incorporated into the Matjhabeng Local Municipality along with the city of Welkom and the towns of Allanridge, Hennenman, Odendaalsrus, and Virginia.

Under apartheid, many black residents lived outside Ventersburg in Mmamahabane, an extra-municipal township. The location has since been expanded into a second district, Tswelangpele.

== People from Ventersburg ==
Kgotso Nkgatho - Actor, Playwriter and Author
