= Tokologo Local Municipality =

Tokologo
- Local municipality
- Seal

- Location in the Free State
- Coordinates: 28°32′31″S 25°14′13″E
- Country: South Africa
- Province: Free State
- District: Lejweleputswa
- Seat: Boshof
- Wards: 4

Government
  - Type: Municipal council
  - Mayor: Boikie David Obotseng

Area
  - Total: 9,326 km^{2} (3,601 sq mi)

Population (2022)
  - Total: 29,455
  - Density: 3.158/km^{2} (8.180/sq mi)

Racial makeup (2022)
  - Black African: 86.0%
  - Coloured: 4.7%
  - Indian/Asian: 0.8%
  - White: 8.3%

First languages (2011)
  - Tswana: 57.3%
  - Afrikaans: 18.7%
  - Xhosa: 10.9%
  - Sotho: 8.5%
  - Other: 4.6%
- Time zone: UTC+2 (SAST)
- Municipal code: FS182

Tokologo Municipality (Tswana: Mmasepala wa Tokologo; Afrikaans: Tokologo Munisipaliteit; Sotho: Masepala wa Tokologo) is a local municipality within the Lejweleputswa District Municipality, in the Free State province of South Africa. Tokologo is a Setswana word meaning "freedom".

== Main places ==
The 2001 census divided the municipality into the following main places:

Place	Code	Area (km^{2})	Population	Most spoken language
Boshof	40801	91.93	3,843	Tswana
Dealesville	40802	0.93	361	Afrikaans
Hertzogville	40803	1.46	438	Afrikaans
Malebogo	40804	1.33	6,409	Tswana
Seretse	40805	0.71	4,465	Tswana
Tswaraganang	40807	0.54	3,270	Tswana
Remainder of the municipality	40806	9,228.76	13,663	Tswana

== Politics ==
The municipal council consists of thirteen members elected by mixed-member proportional representation. Seven councillors are elected by first-past-the-post voting in seven wards, while the remaining six are chosen from party lists so that the total number of party representatives is proportional to the number of votes received.

In the elections of 4 November 2026 the African National Congress (ANC) won a majority of 7 seats on the council.

The following table shows the results of the election.

Party	Ward			List			Total seats
Party	Votes	%	Seats	Votes	%	Seats	Total seats
African National Congress	4,429	51.34	7	4,378	51.16	0	7
Democratic Alliance	1,359	15.75	0	1,389	16.23	2	2
Economic Freedom Fighters	1,100	12.75	0	1,072	12.53	2	2
South African Communist Party	969	11.23	0	969	11.32	1	1
Freedom Front Plus	484	5.61	0	483	5.64	1	1
Independent candidates	15	0.17	0				0
5 other parties	271	3.14	0	267	3.12	0	0
Total	8,627	100.00	7	8,558	100.00	6	13
Valid votes	8,627	97.80		8,558	97.85		
Invalid/blank votes	194	2.20		188	2.15		
Total votes	8,821	100.00		8,746	100.00		
Registered voters/turnout	15,311	57.61		15,311	57.12		

== Maladministration ==
As of January 2024, the municipality is under administration, one of 32 in the country, and three in the Free State where the provincial executive has intervened due to maladministration
