= Mining industry of South Africa =

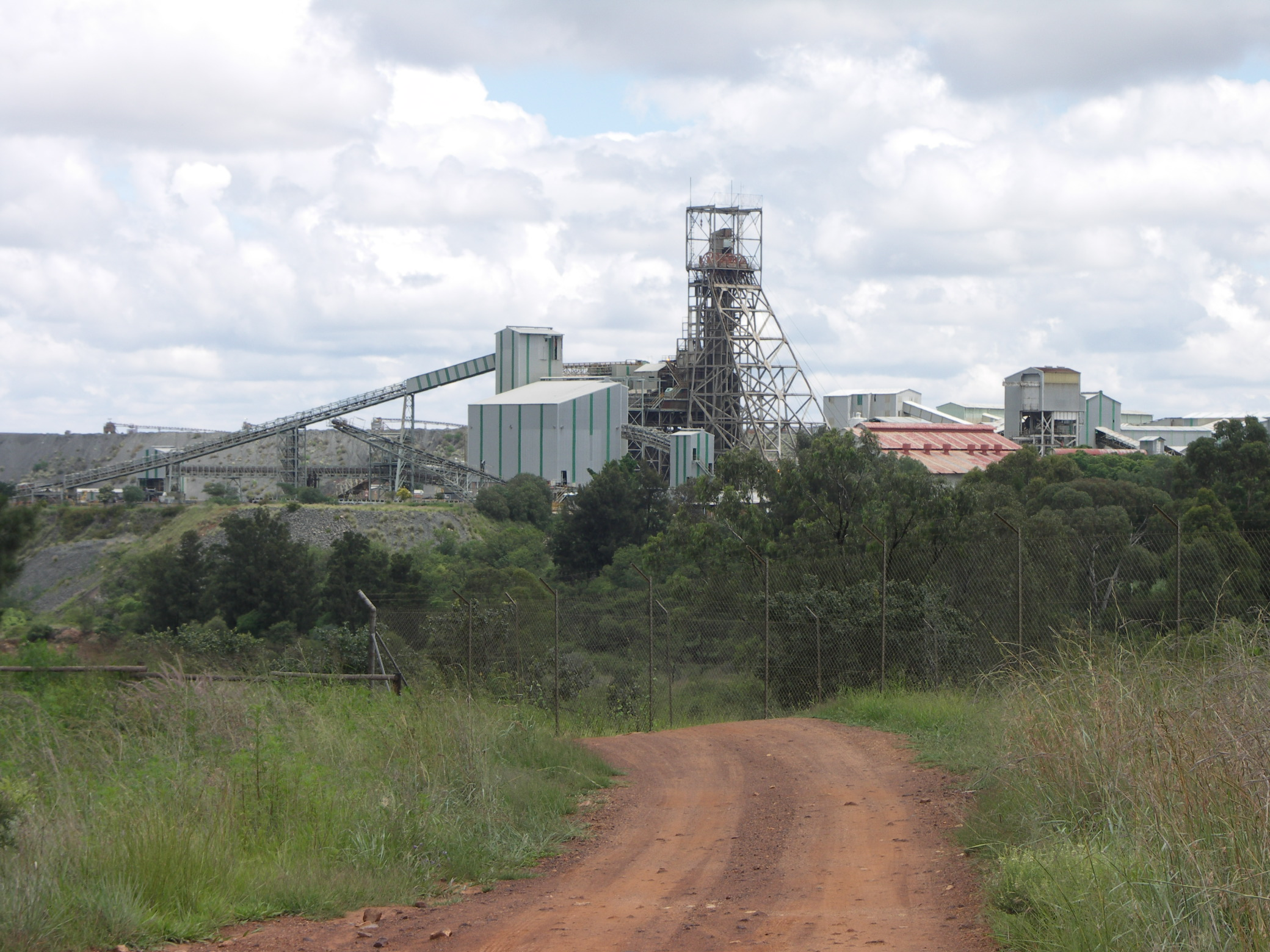
Premier Diamond Mine, Cullinan, Gauteng, South Africa

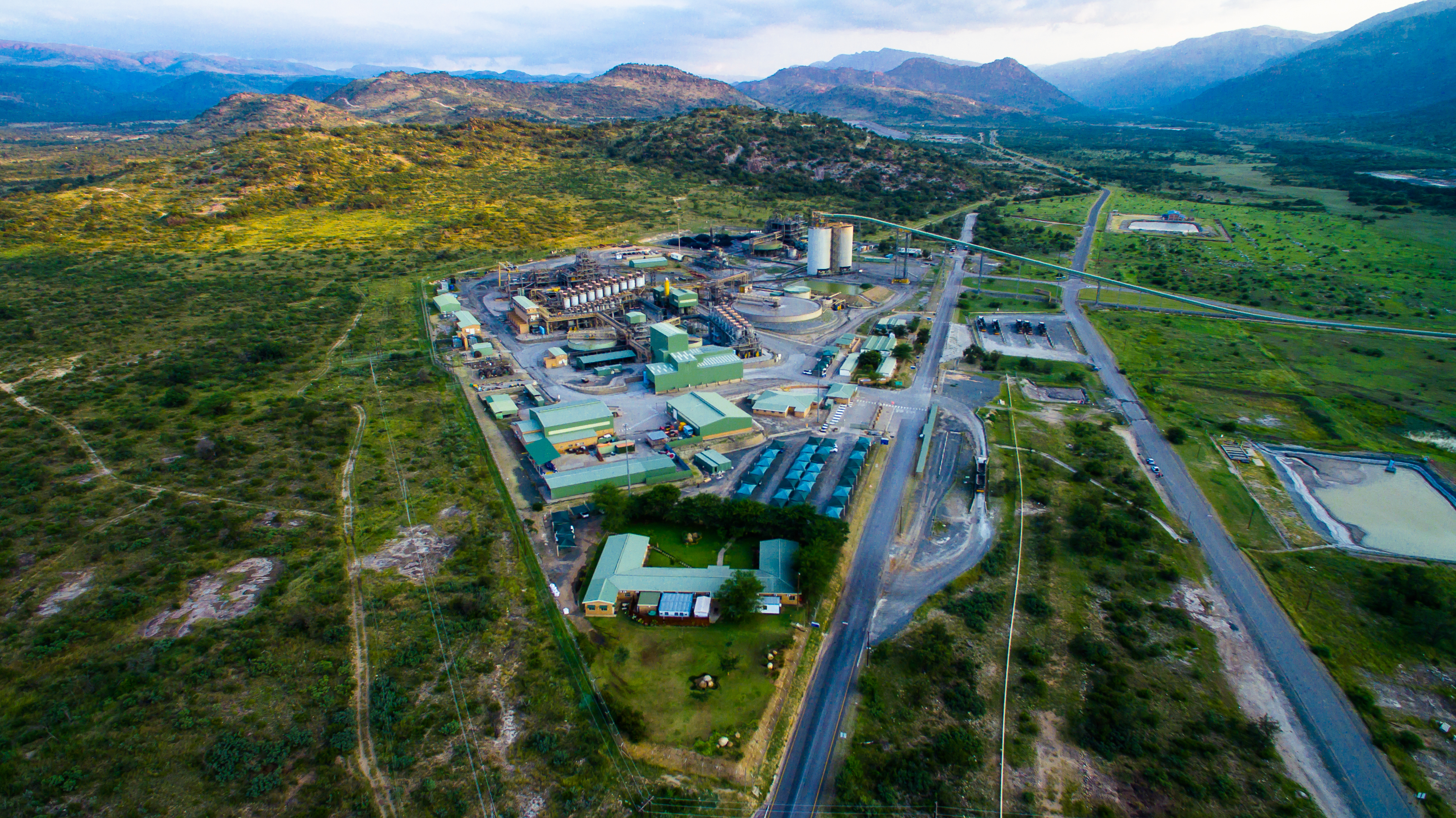
An aerial view of the Two Rivers mine in Steelpoort, Limpopo, owned by both African Rainbow Minerals and Impala Platinum holdings limited.

Mining in South Africa was once the main driving force behind the history and development of Africa's most advanced and richest economy. Large-scale and profitable mining started with the discovery of a diamond on the banks of the Orange River in 1867 by Erasmus Jacobs and the subsequent discovery of the Kimberley pipes a few years later.

Gold rushes to Pilgrim's Rest and Barberton were precursors to the biggest discovery of all, the Main Reef/Main Reef Leader on Gerhardus Oosthuizen's farm Langlaagte, Portion C, in 1886, which kicked off the Witwatersrand Gold Rush and the subsequent rapid development of the gold field there.

Diamond and gold production are now well down from their peaks, though South Africa is still fifth in worldwide gold production and remains a cornucopia of mineral riches. The country is also the world's largest producer of chrome, manganese, platinum, vanadium and vermiculite.

South Africa is the world's second largest producer of ilmenite, palladium, rutile and zirconium. It is also the world's third largest coal exporter. South Africa is also a huge producer of iron ore; in 2012, it overtook India to become the world's third-biggest iron ore supplier to China, the world's largest consumers of iron ore.

Due to a history of corruption and maladministration in the South African mining sector, ANC secretary-general Gwede Mantashe announced at the beginning of 2013 that mining companies misrepresenting their intentions could have their licences revoked.

In 2019, South Africa was the world's largest producer of platinum; the world's largest producer of chromium; the world's largest producer of manganese; the 2nd largest world producer of titanium; the world's 11th largest producer of gold; the 3rd worldwide producer of vanadium; the 6th largest world producer of iron ore; the 11th largest world producer of cobalt; and the 15th largest world producer of phosphate. It was the world's 12th largest producer of uranium in 2018.

The mining sector in South Africa falls under the mandate of the Department of Mineral and Petroleum Resources (DMPR), which was re-established in June 2024, having been split from another Ministry. The department is overseen by the Minister of Mineral and Petroleum Resources.

== History ==
Diamond and gold discoveries played an important part in the growth of the early South African economy. A site northeast of Cape Town was discovered to have rich deposits of diamonds, and thousands of white and blacks rushed to the area of Kimberley in an attempt to profit from the discovery. The British later annexed the region of Griqualand West, an area which included the diamond fields. In 1868, the republic attempted to annex areas near newly discovered diamond fields, drawing protests from the nearby British colonial government. These annexations later led to the First Boer War of 1880–1881.

Native Africans had been mining gold in the Witwatersrand area since prehistory. When white settlers first found this gold for themselves in 1886, it triggered what would become the Witwatersrand Gold Rush of 1886. Like the diamond discoveries before, the gold rush caused thousands of foreign expatriates to flock to the region. This heightened political tensions in the area ultimately contributing to the Second Boer War in 1899.

Ownership of the diamond and gold mines became concentrated in the hands of a few entrepreneurs, largely of European origin, known as the Randlords. South Africa's and the world's biggest diamond miner, De Beers, was funded by baron Nathaniel Mayer Rothschild in 1887, and Cecil Rhodes became the Founding Chairman of the board of directors in 1888. Cecil Rhodes' place was later taken by Sir Ernest Oppenheimer, co-founder of the Anglo-American Corporation with J.P. Morgan.

The gold mining industry continued to grow throughout much of the early 20th century, significantly contributing to the tripling of the economic value of what was then known as the Union of South Africa. In particular, revenue from gold exports provided sufficient capital to purchase much-needed machinery and petroleum products to support an expanding manufacturing base. During apartheid, Black South Africans were excluded from most skilled mining professions by the Mines and Works Act 1911.

By the 1970s, South Africa accounted for over two-thirds of global gold output, with production peaking at over 1,000 tons.

As of 2007, the South African mining industry employs 493,000 workers. The industry represents 18% of South Africa's $588 billion USD Gross Domestic Product.

In 2025, data compiled from the Department of Mineral and Petroleum Resources showed that the South African mining industry had experienced job losses amounting to over 442,000, since the late 1980s. This amounts to 12,000 jobs lost in the industry every year, or 35 jobs per day, for the past 35 years.

Also in 2025, it was also reported that the cost of mining gold in South Africa has become significant, with mining shafts needing to be deeper (often dug kilometers underground), and water and electricity costs being higher. As a result, according to a PwC report, despite South Africa still having 68 million troy ounces of gold reserves left - enough for 27 more years of production - gold mining's contribution to the country's GDP has dropped significantly, from around 20% in the early 1980s to just 6.3% in 2023.

=== Coal ===
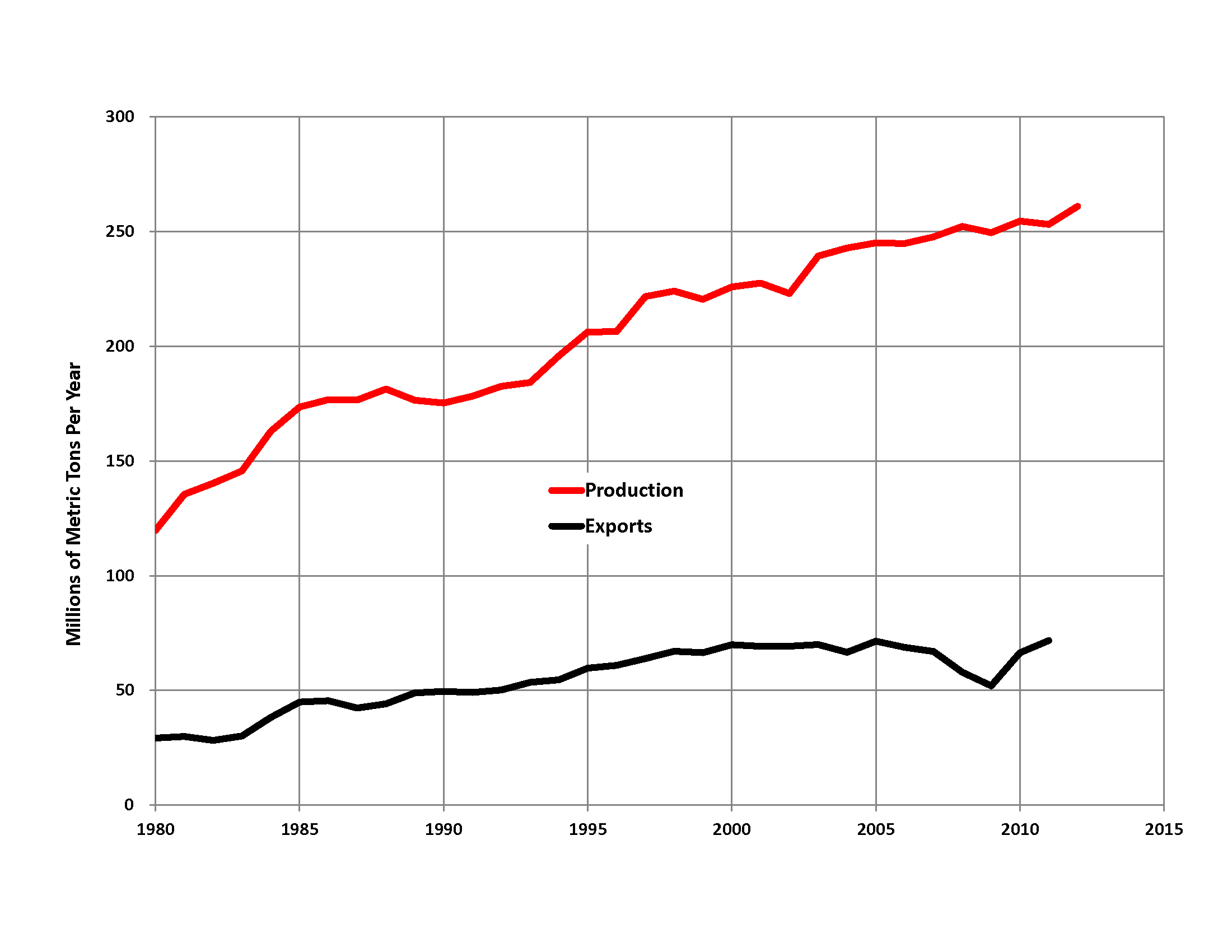
South Africa Coal production (red) and exports (black)

South Africa is the world's third largest coal exporter, and much of the country's coal is used for power production. (about 40%) 77% of South Africa's energy needs are provided by coal.

=== Gold ===
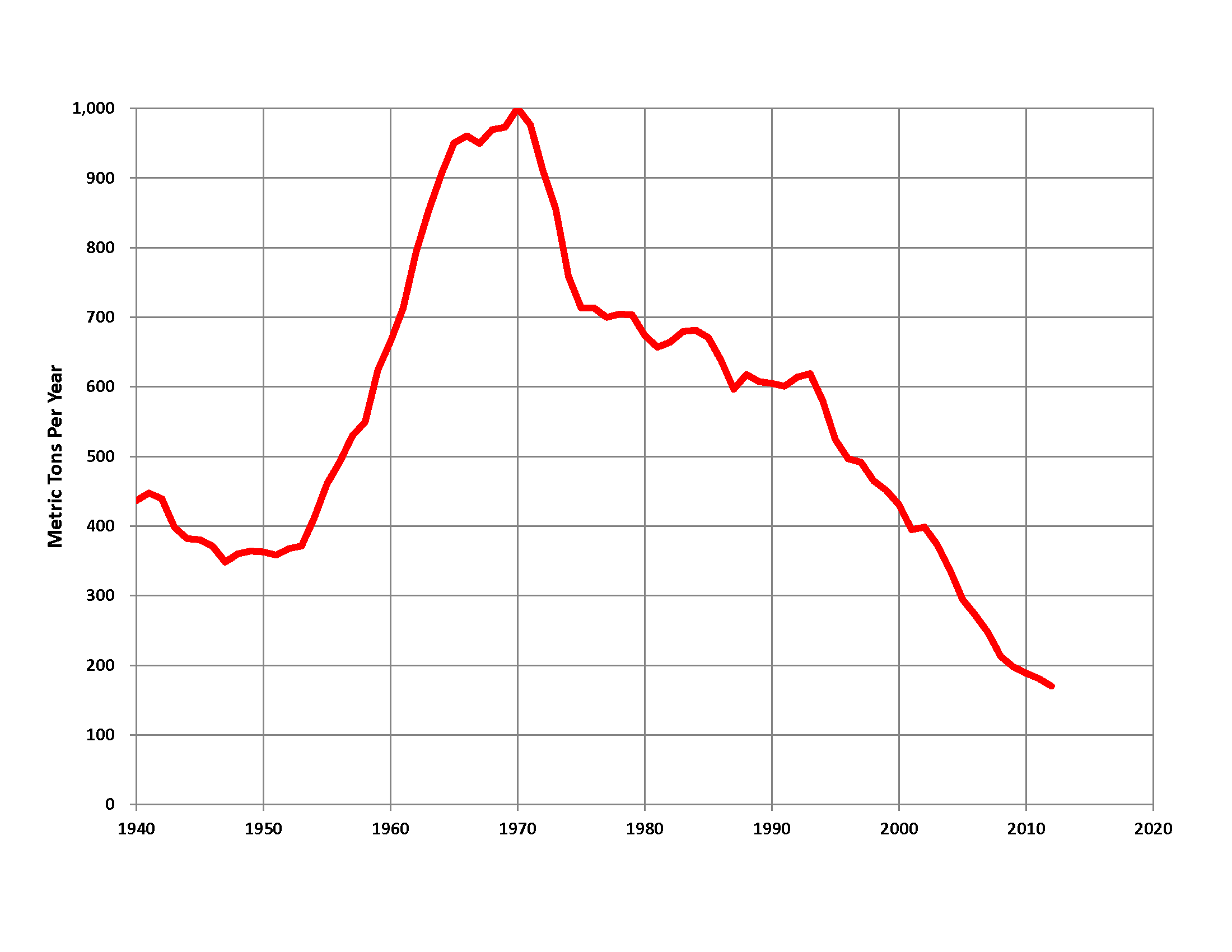
South Africa mined gold production, 1940–2011

South Africa accounted for 15% of the world's gold production in 2002 and 12% in 2005, though the nation had produced as much as 30% of the yearly world output as recently as 1993. Despite declining production, South Africa's gold exports were valued at US$3.8 billion in 2005. As of end-2018, South Africa had a potential 6000 tonnes of reserves. In July 2018, the Mineral Council of South Africa announced that 75% of mines in South Africa were now unprofitable due to the declining gold reserves.

Among the nation's gold mines are two of the deepest mines in the world. The East Rand Mine, in Boksburg, extends to a depth of 3,585 metres (11,762 ft). A 4-metre (13 ft) shallower mine is located at TauTona in Carletonville, though plans are in place to begin work on an extension to the TauTona mine, bringing the total depth to over 3,900 metres (12,800 ft) and breaking the current record by 127 feet (39 m). At these depths the temperature of the rocks is 140 °F (60 °C).

The gold in the Witwatersrand Basin area was deposited in ancient river deltas, having been washed down from surrounding gold-rich greenstone belts to the north and west. Rhenium-osmium isotope studies indicates that the gold in those mineral deposits came from unusual three billion year old mantle sourced intrusions known as komatiites present in the edenvale belts.

The Vredefort Dome impact which lies within the basin and the nearby Bushveld Igneous Complex are both about a billion years younger than the interpreted age of the gold.

Gold in the Free State was prospected in the early 1900s after the development of more advanced drilling techniques. These were necessary as there were no surface gold-bearing reefs in the area, and all prospecting required deep drilling. The first gold bar from these fields was produced in 1951, and despite heavy development costs (which were also observed in the early development of the Witwatersrand fields), companies operating in the area were very optimistic about the possible mining output of the Free State goldfields.

=== Diamonds ===
The first diamond that was ever found was found by a 15-year-old in the south bank of a river (Orange River) during the 1866's and 1867's. Ever since the Kimberley diamond strike of 1868, South Africa has been a world leader in diamond production. The primary South African sources of diamonds, including seven large diamond mines around the country, are controlled by the De Beers Consolidated Mines Company. In 2003, De Beers operations accounted for 94% of the nation's total diamond output of 11,900,000 carats (2.38 t).

This figure includes both gem stones and industrial diamonds. Diamond production rose in 2005 to over 15,800,000 carats (3.16 t). The high value-added diamond cutting industry is in decline in South Africa, mainly due to competition from low-cost labour countries such as India, China and Botswana.

=== Platinum and palladium ===
South Africa produces more platinum and similar metals than any other nation. In 2005, 78% of the world's platinum was produced in South Africa, along with 39% of the world's palladium. Over 163,000 kilograms (5,200,000 ozt) of platinum was produced in 2010, generating export revenues of US$3.82 billion. Palladium is produced in two ways: recovery and mining production. Currently Russia and South Africa are the biggest palladium producers in the world.

=== Chromium ===
Chromium is another leading product of South Africa's mining industry. The metal, used in stainless steel and for a variety of industrial applications, is mined at 10 sites around the country. South Africa's production of chromium accounted for 100% of the world's total production in 2005, and consisted of 7,490,000 metric tons (7,370,000 long tons; 8,260,000 short tons) of material. South Africa holds approximately three-quarters of the world's viable chromite ore resources. In 2012, there were fourteen separate FeCr smelters in South Africa, with a combined production capacity in excess of 4.7 Mt per annum.

=== Uranium ===
South Africa has the second-largest reserves of uranium in the world. The Nuclear Fuels Corporation of South Africa (NUFCOR) started processing uranium as a by-product of gold mining in 1967. Most of the uranium produced as a by-product of gold mining is concentrated in the gold fields of the Witwatersrand area. Uranium is more easily and readily available than gold in South Africa.

In 1943 the Manhattan Project arranged for a worldwide listing of Uranium and Thorium resources. While the occurrence of uranium in Rand gold ore was known it was thought to be of too low a concentration to be useful. However Dr George W. Bain, Professor of Geology at Amherst College thought that uranium would be found in hydrocarbon-bearing material and that the content in Rand gold ore would be of adequate concentration. He was proved right. So in 1959 well over $150 million worth of uranium was exported, and the return from both gold and uranium increased the number of gold mines which were economic.

South Africa was part of the 1972-1976 uranium producers cartel, Societe d'Etudes de Recherches d'Uranium. The other cartel members were Australia, France, and Rio Tinto Zinc Ltd. It was formed by the major non-United States uranium producers to mitigate the impacts of US policy on the uranium market; to do so, the cartel engaged in bid rigging, price fixing, and market sharing. Westinghouse filed an antitrust lawsuit against cartel members in 1976 and the cartel disbanded.

There are a number of mining companies that process uranium from mines that they own. Anglo Gold Ashanti, Sibayane Gold Ltd, Harmony Gold Mining Co., First Uranium, and Peninsula Energy own or control most of the uranium-from-gold mining processing plants in South Africa.

Though uranium production in South Africa showed a decrease from 711t in 2000 to 579t in 2010, in 2011 930t were produced with a forecast of 2,000t by 2020. In 2016, Tasman Pacific Minerals, owned by Peninsula Energy started plans to open the first uranium ore mine, Tasman RSA.

=== Rand Rebellion ===
The Rand Rebellion was a widespread strike among miners in the Witwatersrand area of the Transvaal Province in the former Union of South Africa.

=== 2007 strike ===
In 2007 the South African National Union of Mineworkers, which represents the nation's mineworkers, engaged in a series of talks with the Chamber of Mines, an industry group. The meetings also saw the participation of the Commission for Conciliation, Mediation and Arbitration, a body with mediation authority over the dispute. On 27 November 2007, the National Union of Mineworkers announced that South African mineworkers would go on strike to protest at unsafe working conditions.

The strike took place on 4 December, and impacted over 240,000 workers at 60 sites across the country, including mines devoted to the production of gold, platinum, and coal.

=== 2012 Lonmin strike ===
The Lonmin strike was a strike in August 2012 in the Marikana area, close to Rustenburg, South Africa at a mine owned by Lonmin one of the world's largest primary producers of platinum group metals (PGMs). A series of violent confrontations occurred between platinum mine workers on strike and the South African Police Service on Thursday, 16 August 2012, and resulted in the deaths of 34 individuals (30 were miners and 4 protesters), as well as the injury of an additional 78 miners.

Occurring in the post-apartheid era, it was the deadliest incident of violence between police and the civilian population in South Africa since the 1960 Sharpeville massacre which prompted South African President Jacob Zuma to set up an investigation. Gordon Farlam was appointed as the chairperson of a committee. Under the probe, Cyril Ramaphosa testified for lobbying with the Lonmin and SAPS. Ramaphosa also accepted to the commission that massacre could have been avoided if proper precautionary actions had been taken.

Jacob Zuma declared a 66-day-long week of mourning.

In 2014, platinum industry workers went on a strike that lasted five months. It was the longest strike in the history of South African mining.

In 2019, a high court in Johannesburg approved the historic compensation deal for the miners who contracted the fatal silicosis disease when they worked in the mines.

== Politics ==
A few South African political parties have advocated to nationalizing the country's mining industry. The prominent advocate of this has been UMkhonto weSizwe (political party) (MK), which was founded in 2023 by former South African President, Jacob Zuma, after his expulsion from the African National Congress. Generally, within South African politics, there is not a strong level of support for nationalization of mining, and the industry remains privatized.

Policy uncertainty and regulatory burdens have contributed to a gradual decline of mining activity in South Africa according to Economic Research Southern Africa.

== Social conditions ==
=== Working conditions ===
Conditions on most South African mines are very similar to those elsewhere except for the gold mines where the low geothermal gradient, i.e. the rate at which the temperature goes up with depth, is often as low as 9 °C per kilometre depth (compared with a world average of about 25 °C/km), and this, combined with narrow and very continuous orebodies in hard and competent rocks, makes it possible to mine to depths unattainable elsewhere in the world.

Silica dust is an ever-present potential hazard so that all drilling dust and loose rock has to be wetted down at all times to prevent silicosis, a lethal disease that attacks the lungs. Unfortunately the narrowness of the inclined reefs/orebodies prevents mechanisation except in a very few cases and most work is very labour-intensive. Ventilation requirements to keep working conditions tolerable are huge and a survey of the South African gold mines indicated that the average quantity of ventilating air circulated was some 6 cubic metres per second (210 cu ft/s) per 1000 ton of rock mined per month.

Heat presents another challenge. In the deeper mines refrigeration of the intake air is often necessary to keep conditions tolerable and this is now becoming necessary on some platinum mines which, although shallower, have a higher geothermal gradient. Refrigeration is energy-intensive and it became uncertain whether Eskom, the state power company, could supply the necessary power following grid constraints that began in 2007. These issues reduced power allocations to 90% of previous levels leading up to 2012, when a new power station is ready.

The South African mining industry is frequently criticized for its poor safety record and high number of fatalities but conditions are improving. Total fatalities were 533 in 1995 and had fallen to 199 in 2006. Between 1984 and 2005, more than 11 000 mine workers died. The overall fatality rate in 2006 was 0.43 per 1,000 per annum but this hides some important differences.

The gold mining rate was 0.71, platinum mining was 0.24 and other mining was 0.35. (For comparison, the rate in the Sixties was around 1.5—see any Chamber of Mines Annual of the period). The reason for the difference is quite clear; the gold mines are much deeper and conditions are both more difficult and dangerous than on the shallower platinum mines.

Falls of ground dominated the causes at 72, machinery, transportation and mining accidents caused 70 and the remainder were classed as general. Of the falls of ground, approx. two-thirds were on the deep gold mines, a reflection of the extreme pressure at depth and continual movement of the country rock.

Fatalities in machinery, mining, and transportation often resulted from direct safety violations. These included working on ATVs without safety belts, working below loose rock in ore passes, being crushed between mining locomotives and ventilation door frames due to minimal clearance, and working on running conveyors. Drilling into misfires was another cited example of sloppy and unsafe mining.

Falls of ground can be difficult to eliminate, given their unpredictability, which increases with depth. There are difficulties in providing continuous roof support, as on longwall coal mines, due to the violence of a face blast in the hard rock of the gold mines. But improved training could instill a sense of safe working practice in relatively inexperienced miners.

Mine safety received considerable publicity in 2007, particularly after 3,200 workers were temporarily trapped underground at the Elandskraal mine after a compressed air pipe ruptured due to internal corrosion, broke loose and fell into the man-hoisting shaft. The workers were eventually rescued through the rock hoisting shaft after the blasting smoke had cleared. The incident caused South African President Thabo Mbeki to mandate full safety audits for all operating mines. This audit has caused additional facilities to shut down temporarily, including the nation's largest gold mine located at Driefontein.

=== Sexuality ===
Multiple studies in the 1990s and 2000s showed that South African men working in mines have had sex with one another. Often, these relationships would take the form of older men persuading younger men with lucrative gifts, including some or all of their wages. Younger men also "married" older workers and performed "wifely" duties. The South African state was aware of these unofficial marriages, and did not intervene because of the economic necessity of miners.

== See also ==
- African Exploration Mining and Finance Corporation
- Asbestos and the law
- Mineral Revolution
- Mine Health and Safety Council

== Bibliography ==
- Paul Jourdan, The Mining Industry in a Free South Africa, Labour Research Service, 1993
- Leo Katzen, A. A. Balkema, Gold & the South African Economy: The Influence of the Goldmining Industry on Business Cycles and Economic Growth in South Africa, 1886–1961, 1964

== Novels about the mining industry in South Africa ==
- Wilbur Smith, When the Lion Feeds, 1964
