= Tswana =

Tswana may refer to:

- Tswana people, the Bantu speaking people in Botswana, South Africa, Namibia, Zimbabwe, Zambia, and other Southern Africa regions
- Tswana language, the language spoken by the (Ba)Tswana people
- Tswanaland, a former bantustan in South-West Africa
- Tswana cattle, an indigenous beef cattle breed of Botswana
