= Johnny Mokhali =

Johnny Mokhali is a South African musician who has achieved success in Southern Africa, including South Africa and Botswana.

== Early life ==
Mokhali was born in the Free State, South Africa and moved to the North West, growing up in the village of Lotlhakane near Mafikeng. He started singing in 1978, developing his voice and performing in local venues before recording professionally.

== Career ==
He released his first album, “Ditorong,” in 1983 and continued to produce music over the years, with notable songs including; Lerato Ka Mogala, Tsa Pelo Yame, Sediba Sa Mafoko, and Ma Afrika Re Ya Kae.

== Discography ==
Sediba Sa Mafoko (1995).

Lerato Ka Mogala, Ba Tlogeleng, Sesa Feleleng.
