= Kopanang mine =

Iron ore mine in Northern Cape, South Africa

Coordinates: 27.8554°S 23.0134°E

Khumani mine
- Interactive map of Khumani mine
- Location: Northern Cape, South Africa
- Products: Iron ore

The Khumani mine is a large iron mine located in central South Africa in Northern Cape. Khumani represents one of the largest iron ore reserves in South Africa and in the world having estimated reserves of 709 million tonnes of ore grading 64.2% iron metal.
