= Mine Health and Safety Council =

South African state-owned institution

Mine Health and Safety Council of South Africa
- Founded: October 4, 1997; 28 years ago
- Founded at: South Africa
- Type: Public
- Legal status: public health
- Purpose: To advise the Minister of Mineral Resources on occupational health and safety legislation on improving and promoting occupational health and safety in South African mines.
- Location: South Africa
- Chairperson: Humphrey Mathe
- Chief Executive Officer: Mosa Mabuza
- Chief Financial Officer: Leonard Matsepe
- Senior Management: David Khoza
- Website: mhsc.org.za

Mine Health and Safety Council (MHSC) is a South African national public agency that was established in accordance with the amendment of Mine Health and Safety Act, 29 of 1996. The agency has its subordinate operating and represented by state and employer, as well as labour members with supervision from the Chief Inspector of Mines. The MHSC, funded by public revenue, as well as being accountable to national assembly, advises and proposes ideas to the Minister of Mineral Resources on occupational health and safety legislation intended to promote occupational health and safety in South African mines. The agency was established in the early 1997.
