= Mineral Revolution =

Phase of South African history

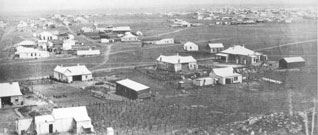
The farm near Johannesburg where gold was first discovered in 1886

The Mineral Revolution is a term used by historians to refer to the rapid industrialisation and economic changes which occurred in South Africa from the 1860s onwards. The Mineral Revolution was largely driven by the need to create a permanent workforce to work in the mining industry, and saw South Africa transformed from a patchwork of agrarian states to a unified, industrial nation. In political terms, the Mineral Revolution had a significant impact on diplomacy and military affairs. Finally, the policies and events of the Mineral Revolution had an increasingly negative impact on race relations in South Africa, and formed the basis of the apartheid system, which dominated South African society for a century. The Mineral Revolution was caused by the discovery of diamonds in Kimberley in 1867 and also by the discovery of gold in Witwatersrand in 1886. The mineral mining revolution laid the foundations of racial segregation and the control of white South Africans over black South Africans. The Mineral Revolution changed South Africa from being an agricultural society to becoming the largest gold producing country in the world.

== Economics ==
=== Mining ===
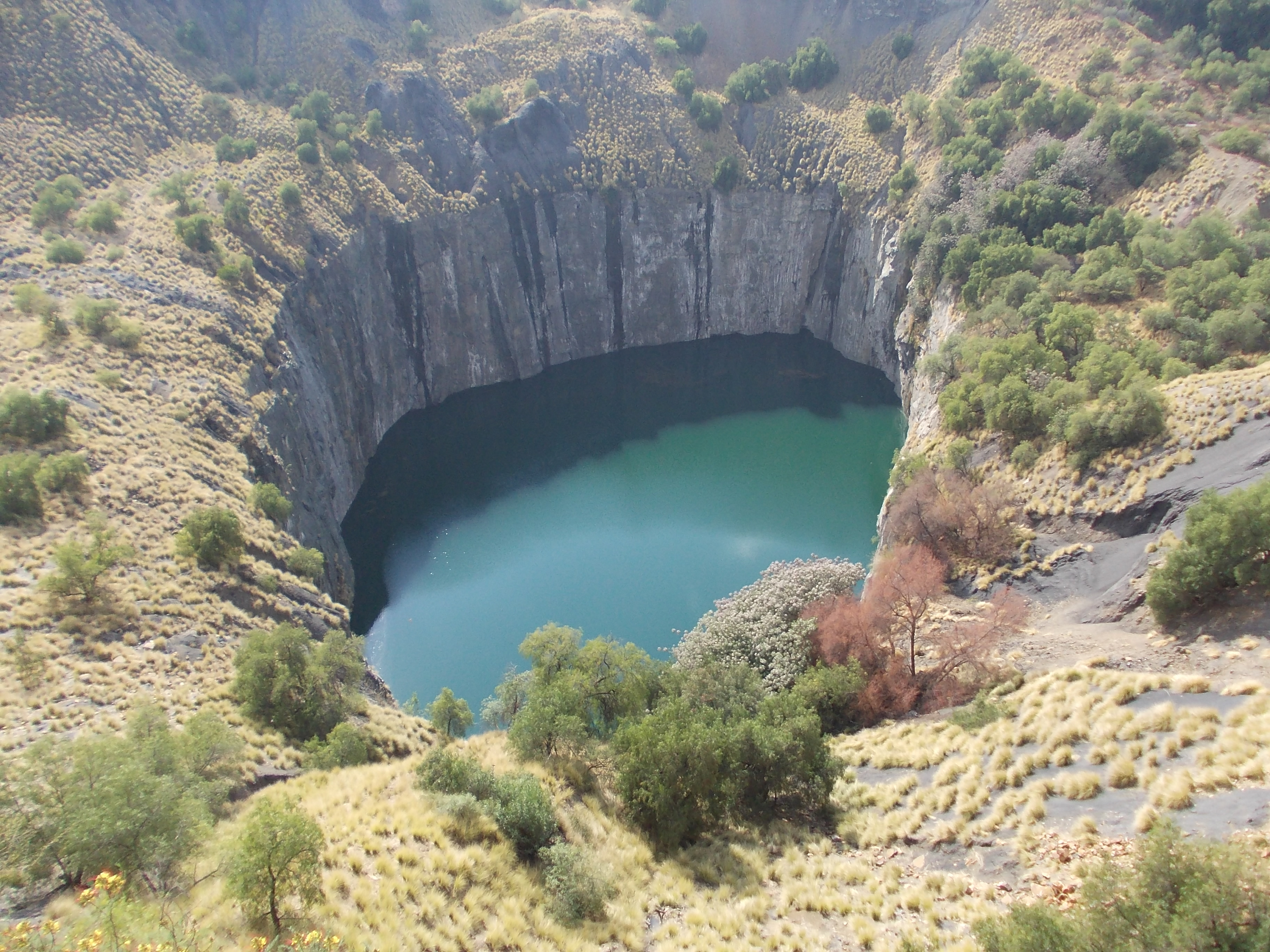
The Big Hole, Kimberley

The Mineral Revolution began with the discovery of diamonds at the town of Kimberley in 1867. The discovery of diamonds led to a rush of prospectors descending on the town, whose population skyrocketed as increasing numbers of prospectors arrived to seek their fortune. As more diggers arrived in Kimberley, diamond-mining increased in scale, focusing in open-pit mining of three main sites. As surface deposits of diamonds were excavated, deeper pits had to be dug, propelling the Mineral Revolution into a new phase.

To excavate deep deposits of diamonds, diggers needed machinery (particularly steam engines), credit, and a large labour force. These were unavailable to ordinary diggers, and the diamond mines were quickly taken over by the "mining capitalists" – large corporations with access to credit, machinery, and labour.

The discovery of gold at the Witwatersrand orefields in 1886 triggered a gold rush which greatly escalated this continuing trend. The orefields, which overlapped British and Afrikaner territory, were quickly excavated of all surface deposits and a similar pattern to Kimberley emerged – small diggers were bought out by large corporations. At Kimberley, the diamond mines fell under the monopoly of De Beers, while at the Rand orefields, land was bought up by Wiener man, Breit & Eckstein, Consolidated Gold Mines Inc., and a number of smaller companies.

The emergence of industrial-scale mining forced major demographic shifts in South Africa's population. During the early stages of mining, labour had been primarily provided by young men from the African states, primarily Pedi men. The young men would travel to the mines during the summer to provide temporary labour and earn enough wages to buy status symbols, such as cattle or guns, before returning home. This system, though, was too unreliable to provide a permanent labour force and was not acceptable to the mining corporations. Young men arriving at the mines were often exhausted from their journey and had to be given two weeks' rest, at company expense, before they were fit to work in the mines. Workers who were not paid on time or did not like their living conditions (which were often very harsh due to bad food and disease) tended to drift away, and workers were at risk of being recalled to their own countries, as happened in 1876 when the chief of Pediland recalled all Pedi men at the mines to fight in a war against the Transvaal. The need to create a fixed, permanent labour force at Kimberley and on the Rand became the primary objective of the mining corporations and the colonial government.

The increasing scale of mining operations prompted the corporations to offer very low wages. Extracting diamonds from rocks, and processing the low-quality gold ore at the Rand, was very labour-intensive and required armies of workers. To offset the cost of employing so many workers, and to compensate for the high salaries offered to machine supervisors and administrators, the companies offered very low wages to ordinary labourers, resulting in falling living standards in urban areas.

=== Urbanization ===
The need to create a fixed labour force resulted in the colonial government, and the mining corporations, introducing a variety of schemes to keep workers on-site for lengthy periods of time. Corporate agents travelled to African states, offering fixed contracts and prearranged wages to attract young African men to the mines.

At the mine sites, corporations introduced various schemes to keep workers on-site. This was partially motivated in Kimberley by the corporation's fear that workers were stealing diamonds and selling them on the black market. To counteract this assumed threat, De Beers introduced strip searching, whereby workers leaving the mines at the end of a shift would be undressed and searched for diamonds. A more extreme measure was taken in the early 1880s by De Beers, when the company introduced corporate compounds. These enclosed compounds were built in the style of open-air prisons, where workers were required to live by the terms of their contract, in exchange for food, accommodation, and cheap beer provided by the company. In reality, workers had to pay for things out of their paltry wages, while the compounds themselves were notorious for disease, malnutrition, and death. In 1886 white workers at the De Beers compound in Kimberley elected a local member of parliament who successfully campaigned for white employees to live in the town, but black workers, who had no vote, were forced to remain on the compounds.

=== Agriculture ===
The growth of towns and cities across South Africa prompted changes in rural areas, as farms lost labourers to the mines and demand for food and agricultural produce increased. By the 1870s, "agrarian capitalism" had emerged, with large commercial farms buying up smallholdings and producing commercial goods for sale in the towns. This resulted in tens of thousands of black and white farmers losing their jobs, and being forced to work as wage-labourers on commercial farms or migrate to the cities in search of work. These changes greatly increased South Africa's agricultural output as commercial farms were more efficient and had greater access to farming machinery than small farms, and saw social changes in rural areas. The peasantry effectively disappeared, and a new class, the "rural gentry", emerged. These middle-class farmers, midway between the large commercial farms and smallholdings, were able to significantly increase their earnings by producing cash crops such as coffee, tobacco, sugar, and grapes, which were not labour-intensive and which fetched high prices at urban markets. Animal husbandry also increased, with increasingly large swathes of land being turned over to sheep and cattle farming.

=== Infrastructure ===
Mass migration to towns, urban growth, and the increasingly urban demand for rural produce prompted the development of South Africa's transport and communications infrastructure. Railways were greatly expanded to link towns to each other and to the countryside, and ports such as Durban and Cape Town were expanded to cope with increasing immigration and commercial activity, greatly stimulated development in South Africa.

== Politics ==
The Witwatersrand is located in the former Boer republic of the Transvaal (South African Republic)

The Mineral Revolution had a major impact on political developments in South Africa. The Cape Colony required armies of workers for the mines and support industries, and to secure a regular flow of workers to the mines, the colonial government began a series of annexations of neighbouring African states, such as Basutoland, Bechuanaland, and Pediland. In the newly annexed territories, the colonial government introduced laws such as the Hut tax, which demanded that inhabitants pay an annual tax on their dwellings, paid in British cash. As the only way to earn British currency was via employment in the mines, this created a steady flow of workers as young men travelled to the mines to earn money, which they sent back to their families to pay the tax.

The 1879 Anglo-Zulu War also had roots in the Mineral Revolution, specifically as the Cape Colony wished to neutralise any potential threats to the mines. In the aftermath of the war, thousands of young Zulu men migrated to the mines in search of work, driving down wages and exacerbating the already cramped conditions in the compounds.

The 1899–1902 Second Anglo-Boer War can be traced to the Mineral Revolution. Britain's desire to control the entire Rand region (which overlapped neighbouring Transvaal), remove potential threats to the mines, and encourage industrial expansion by replacing the slow and inexperienced Afrikaner bureaucracy with British laws and regulations led to increasing tension between the British colonies and the Afrikaner states, resulting in the outbreak of war in 1899. The Second Anglo-Boer War united South Africa as a single state (initially British, but fully self-governing from 1910).

== Environmental impact ==
Mining operations at the Rand and at Kimberley caused severe environmental damage. Open-pit mining was not only dangerous for the workers, but created deep pits which grew wider during rainfall. Urban growth placed increasing strains on water supplies and led to increasing pollution of rivers. In rural areas, commercial farming led to a steady degradation in soil quality, while increasing animal husbandry led to severe soil erosion in many places, as cattle drank scarce water supplies and pulled up the grass holding the soil together. Mechanised farming and over-grazing led by 1910 to the appearance of immense dongas (gullies) in the countryside, which carried away soil and scarred the landscape, and contributed to dustbowls across South Africa in the early decades of the twentieth century.

== See also ==
- Mining industry of South Africa
