= Matjhabeng Local Municipality =

Matjhabeng
- Local municipality
- Seal

- Location in the Free State
- Coordinates: 27°58′S 26°44′E
- Country: South Africa
- Province: Free State
- District: Lejweleputswa
- Seat: Welkom
- Wards: 36

Government
  - Type: Municipal council
  - Mayor: Thanduxolo Khalipha (ANC)

Area
  - Total: 5,155 km^{2} (1,990 sq mi)

Population (2022)
  - Total: 439,034
  - Density: 85.17/km^{2} (220.6/sq mi)

Racial makeup (2022)
  - Black African: 88.1%
  - Coloured: 2.3%
  - Indian/Asian: 0.5%
  - White: 9.0%

First languages (2011)
  - Sotho: 64.0%
  - Xhosa: 12.3%
  - Afrikaans: 12.3%
  - English: 3.6%
  - Other: 7.8%
- Time zone: UTC+2 (SAST)
- Municipal code: FS184

Matjhabeng Municipality (Sotho: Masepala wa Matjhabeng; Xhosa: uMasipala wase Matjhabeng; Afrikaans: Matjhabeng Munisipaliteit) is a local municipality within the Lejweleputswa District Municipality, in the Free State province of South Africa. The municipality includes Welkom, Virginia, Odendaalsrus and Allanridge. Matjhabeng is a Sesotho word meaning "where nations meet". It is derived from the migrant labour system where people from various countries like Lesotho, Mozambique, etc. met to work in the mines.

== Geography ==
The municipality covers an area of 5,155 square kilometres (1,990 sq mi) in the goldfields of the central Free State, north of Bloemfontein and south of Kroonstad. According to the 2011 census it has a population of 406,461 people in 123,195 households. Of this population, 88% describe themselves as "Black African", 10% as "White", and 2% as "Coloured". The first language of 64% of the population is Sotho, while 12% speak Xhosa, 12% speak Afrikaans and 4% speak English.

In the western part of the municipality there is a string of mining towns that runs from northwest to southeast: Allanridge (pop. 19,337), Odendaalsrus (pop. 63,743), Welkom (pop. 211,011) and Virginia (pop. 66,208). Further to the east are the agricultural towns of Hennenman (pop. 24,355) and Ventersburg (pop. 11,260).

== Politics ==
The municipal council consists of seventy-two members elected by mixed-member proportional representation. Thirty-six councillors are elected by first-past-the-post voting in thirty-six wards, while the remaining thirty-six are chosen from party lists so that the total number of party representatives is proportional to the number of votes received.

In the election of 4 November 2026, no party won a majority. The African National Congress (ANC) won the largest number of seats in the council.

The following table shows the results of the 2026 election.

| Party | Ward | | | List | | | Total seats |
| Party | Votes | % | Seats | Votes | % | Seats | Total seats |
|---|---|---|---|---|---|---|---|
| African National Congress | 36,664 | 35.67 | 23 | 36,589 | 35.41 | 3 | 26 |
| Democratic Alliance | 33,920 | 33.00 | 13 | 34,581 | 33.46 | 11 | 24 |
| Economic Freedom Fighters | 7,144 | 6.95 | 0 | 7,466 | 7.22 | 5 | 5 |
| South African Communist Party | 4,482 | 4.36 | 0 | 4,005 | 3.88 | 3 | 3 |
| Freedom Front Plus | 3,986 | 3.88 | 0 | 4,380 | 4.24 | 3 | 3 |
| Patriotic Alliance | 2,951 | 2.87 | 0 | 2,936 | 2.84 | 2 | 2 |
| Voice for Change | 2,296 | 2.23 | 0 | 2,931 | 2.84 | 2 | 2 |
| ActionSA | 2,059 | 2.00 | 0 | 2,334 | 2.26 | 2 | 2 |
| African Congress for Transformation | 2,105 | 2.05 | 0 | 2,084 | 2.02 | 2 | 2 |
| African Transformation Movement | 1,362 | 1.33 | 0 | 1,480 | 1.43 | 1 | 1 |
| United Residents Front | 932 | 0.91 | 0 | 617 | 0.60 | 1 | 1 |
| Inkatha Freedom Party | 608 | 0.59 | 0 | 553 | 0.54 | 1 | 1 |
| Independent candidates | 45 | 0.04 | 0 | | | | 0 |
| 20 other parties | 4,229 | 4.11 | 0 | 3,382 | 3.27 | 0 | 0 |
| Total | 102,783 | 100.00 | 36 | 103,338 | 100.00 | 36 | 72 |
| Valid votes | 102,783 | 98.31 | | 103,338 | 98.37 | | |
| Invalid/blank votes | 1,771 | 1.69 | | 1,711 | 1.63 | | |
| Total votes | 104,554 | 100.00 | | 105,049 | 100.00 | | |
| Registered voters/turnout | 206,480 | 50.64 | | 206,480 | 50.88 | | |

=== Corruption and mismanagement ===
In 2011 the municipality was described by media as one of the worst-run municipalities in the country. In about four years about R2 billion went missing. An enquiry led by the MEC Mosebenzi Zwane blamed the losses on the municipal manager Ben Malakoane and his predecessor Thabo Pietersen. Zwane's report slated Malakoane as "grossly negligent", "undermining the rule of law" and engaging in contracts "without due process", but premier Ace Magashule referred to the duo as his "comrades". In 2021 five municipality officials were arrested by the Hawks after over R1 million of municipal funds was allegedly misspent. One of the accused was involved in appointing the remaining accused as municipal officials. In August 2023 Matjhabeng Local Municipality irregularyly awarded controversial businessman and supspected underworld kingpin,Katiso Molefe a tender for the Welkom Cargo Airport. This allegedly happened two days after registering his company that later won the bid.

In October 2024, the Free State High Court found that the municipality had violated the constitution by failing to deliver essential services and issued a declaratory order. The municipality appealed, but this was rejected in March 2025.

In June 2025, the municipality and its acting municipal manager Thabo Panyani were found guilty of contempt of court and fined R250,000 for repeatedly failing to address sewage spillage issues.

== Socioeconomic issues ==
The municipality experiences high unemployment which was exacerbated by the COVID-19 pandemic. As of 2021, about 150,000 adults are unemployed. Some 10 gold mines closed their shafts, and suppliers of these mines closed shop. Crime has increased in its towns and townships, especially in Meloding, Virginia, Thabong and Welkom. The reported crimes include theft and vandalism of municipal property and infrastructure, besides illegal mining by zama zamas, costly cable theft, theft of fencing material and vandalism of cemeteries.

== Corruption ==
On 28 July 2025, the Minister of Public Works and Infrastructure, Dean Macpherson, revealed that Matjhabeng's expanded public works programme (EPWP) salaries were being used to fund former councillors and political office bearers. Macpherson later cleared the municipality after an investigation revealed that the officials were not EPWP participants. Matjhabeng MMC has been accused of corruption for awarding a tender worth R15 million rands to his and his company.
