= Lejweleputswa District Municipality =

Lejweleputswa
- District municipality
- Seal

- Location of Lejweleputswa District Municipality within Free State
- Coordinates: 27°58′S 26°44′E
- Country: South Africa
- Province: Free State
- Seat: Welkom
- Local municipalities: List: Masilonyana; Tokologo; Tswelopele; Matjhabeng; Nala

Government
  - Type: Municipal council
  - Mayor: Veronica Ntakumbana

Area
  - Total: 31,930 km^{2} (12,330 sq mi)

Population (2011)
  - Total: 627,626
  - Density: 19.66/km^{2} (50.91/sq mi)

Racial makeup (2011)
  - Black African: 88.9%
  - Coloured: 1.9%
  - Indian/Asian: 0.4%
  - White: 8.6%

First languages (2011)
  - Sotho: 62.2%
  - Xhosa: 12.2%
  - Afrikaans: 11.3%
  - Tswana: 5.9%
  - Other: 8.4%
- Time zone: UTC+2 (SAST)
- Municipal code: DC18

The Lejweleputswa District Municipality (Sotho: Masepala wa Setereke wa Lejweleputswa; Xhosa: uMasipala weSithili sase Lejweleputswa; Afrikaans: Lejweleputswa-distriksmunisipaliteit) is one of the 5 districts of the Free State province of South Africa. The seat of the municipality is Welkom. As of 2011, a majority of its 657,019 residents speak Sotho. The district code is DC18. Lejweleputswa is a Sesotho word meaning "grey rock".

== Neighbours ==
Lejweleputswa is surrounded by:

- Dr Kenneth Kaunda in North West to the north (DC40)
- Fezile Dabi to the north-east (DC20)
- Thabo Mofutsanyane to the south-east (DC19)
- Mangaung Metro to the south
- Xhariep to the south-west (DC16)
- Frances Baard in Northern Cape to the west (DC9)
- Dr Ruth Segomotsi Mompati in North West to the north-west (DC39)

== Local municipalities ==
The district contains the following local municipalities:

Local municipality	Population	%	Dominant language
Matjhabeng	408 156	62.12%	Sotho
Nala	98 264	14.96%	Sotho
Masilonyana	64 402	9.80%	Sotho
Tswelopele	53 713	8.18%	Sotho
Tokologo	32 455	4.94%	Tswana

== Demographics ==
The following statistics are from the 2001 census.

Language	Population	%
Sotho	403 866	61.47%
Xhosa	99 455	15.14%
Afrikaans	66 418	10.11%
Tswana	50 835	7.74%
Zulu	11 051	1.68%
English	7 981	1.21%
Tsonga	6 371	0.97%
Ndebele	4 283	0.65%
Swati	2 369	0.36%
Other	2 141	0.33%
Northern Sotho	1 666	0.25%
Venda	554	0.08%

=== Gender ===
Gender	Population	%
Female	335 378	51.05%
Male	321 641	48.95%

=== Ethnic group ===
Ethnic group	Population	%
Black African	586 657	89.29%
White	56 640	8.62%
Coloured	13 179	2.01%
Indian/Asian	543	0.08%

=== Age ===
Age	Population	%
000 - 004	62 795	9.56%
005 - 009	63 350	9.64%
010 - 014	70 582	10.74%
015 - 019	70 068	10.66%
020 - 024	59 737	9.09%
025 - 029	55 793	8.49%
030 - 034	53 328	8.12%
035 - 039	54 193	8.25%
040 - 044	46 564	7.09%
045 - 049	36 013	5.48%
050 - 054	25 801	3.93%
055 - 059	17 994	2.74%
060 - 064	14 175	2.16%
065 - 069	10 978	1.67%
070 - 074	6 841	1.04%
075 - 079	3 991	0.61%
080 - 084	3 014	0.46%
085 - 089	1 111	0.17%
090 - 094	432	0.07%
095 - 099	171	0.03%
100 plus	88	0.01%

== Politics ==
=== Election results ===
Election results for Lejweleputswa in the South African general election, 2004.

- Population 18 and over: 418 466 [63.69% of total population]
- Total votes: 234 060 [35.62% of total population]
- Voting % estimate: 55.93% votes as a % of population 18 and over

Party	Votes	%
African National Congress	195 970	83.73%
Democratic Alliance	20 043	8.56%
Freedom Front Plus	3 774	1.61%
United Democratic Movement	3 016	1.29%
African Christian Democratic Party	2 806	1.20%
Pan African Congress	2 387	1.02%
New National Party	1 779	0.76%
Inkhata Freedom Party	947	0.40%
Independent Democrats	903	0.39%
Azanian People's Organisation	816	0.35%
United Christian Democratic Party	432	0.18%
SOPA	283	0.12%
NA	195	0.08%
CDP	132	0.06%
EMSA	131	0.06%
UF	125	0.05%
PJC	111	0.05%
TOP	79	0.03%
KISS	50	0.02%
NLP	42	0.02%
Minority Front	39	0.02%
Total	234 060	100.00%

== Corruption ==
In August 2025, the ANC Provincial Executive Committee resolved to fire all its leaders in underperforming local municipality to address governance failures, corruption, and service delivery challenges ahead of the 2026 local elections. Lejweleputsa was one of those affected.
