= De Beer =

De Beer is a Dutch and Afrikaans surname, meaning "the bear". Notable people with the surname include:

- Cornelius de Beer (c.1590–1651), Dutch painter and engraver active in Spain; son of Joos
- Dylan de Beer (born 1982), Zimbabwean cricketer
- Esmond Samuel de Beer (1895–1990), New Zealand bibliophile, art collector and philanthropist
- Fritz de Beer (born 1996), South African cricketer
- Gavin de Beer (1899–1972), British evolutionary embryologist
- Gerhard de Beer (born 1994), South African football player
- Hans de Beer (born 1957), Dutch illustrator and author
- Jan de Beer (c.1475–1528), Flemish painter and draughtsman
- Jannie de Beer (born 1971), South African rugby player
- Johan de Beer (born 1972), South African tennis player
- Joos de Beer (<1535–1591), Dutch painter
- Lonell de Beer (born 1980), South African cricketer
- Lotte de Beer, Dutch opera director
- María Eugenia de Beer (died 1652), Spanish engraver; daughter of Cornelius
- Racheltjie de Beer (1831–1843), Afrikaner heroine who may be fictional
- Roman de Beer (born 1994), South African racing driver
- Sam de Beer (born 1944), South African politician
- Sue de Beer (born 1973), American artist
- Surina De Beer (born 1978), South African tennis player
- Tinus de Beer (born 1996), South African rugby player
- Walter Wolff de Beer (1892–1983), Dutch philatelist
- Willem de Beer (born 1988), South African sprinter
- Willy de Beer (born 1942), Dutch speed skater
- Wolfgang de Beer (1964–2024), German footballer
- Zach de Beer (1928–1999), South African politician and businessman

== See also ==
- De Beers, diamond company named after the farmers Diederik Arnoldus and Johannes Nicolaas de Beer who sold the land with one of the first diamond mines of the company
- DeBeer Lacrosse, American sports equipment manufacturer
