= Middle Vaal Water Management Area =

Middle Vaal WMA. or Middle Vaal Water Management Area (coded: 9), Includes the following major rivers: the Vet River, Vals River and Vaal River, and covers the following Dams:

- Allemanskraal Dam - Sand River
- Bloemhof Dam - Vaal River
- Elandskuil Dam - Swartleegte River
- Erfenis Dam - Vet River
- Koppies Dam - Renoster River
- Rietspruit Dam - Rietspruit

== Boundaries ==
Tertiary drainage regions C24, C25, C41 to C43, C60 and C70.
