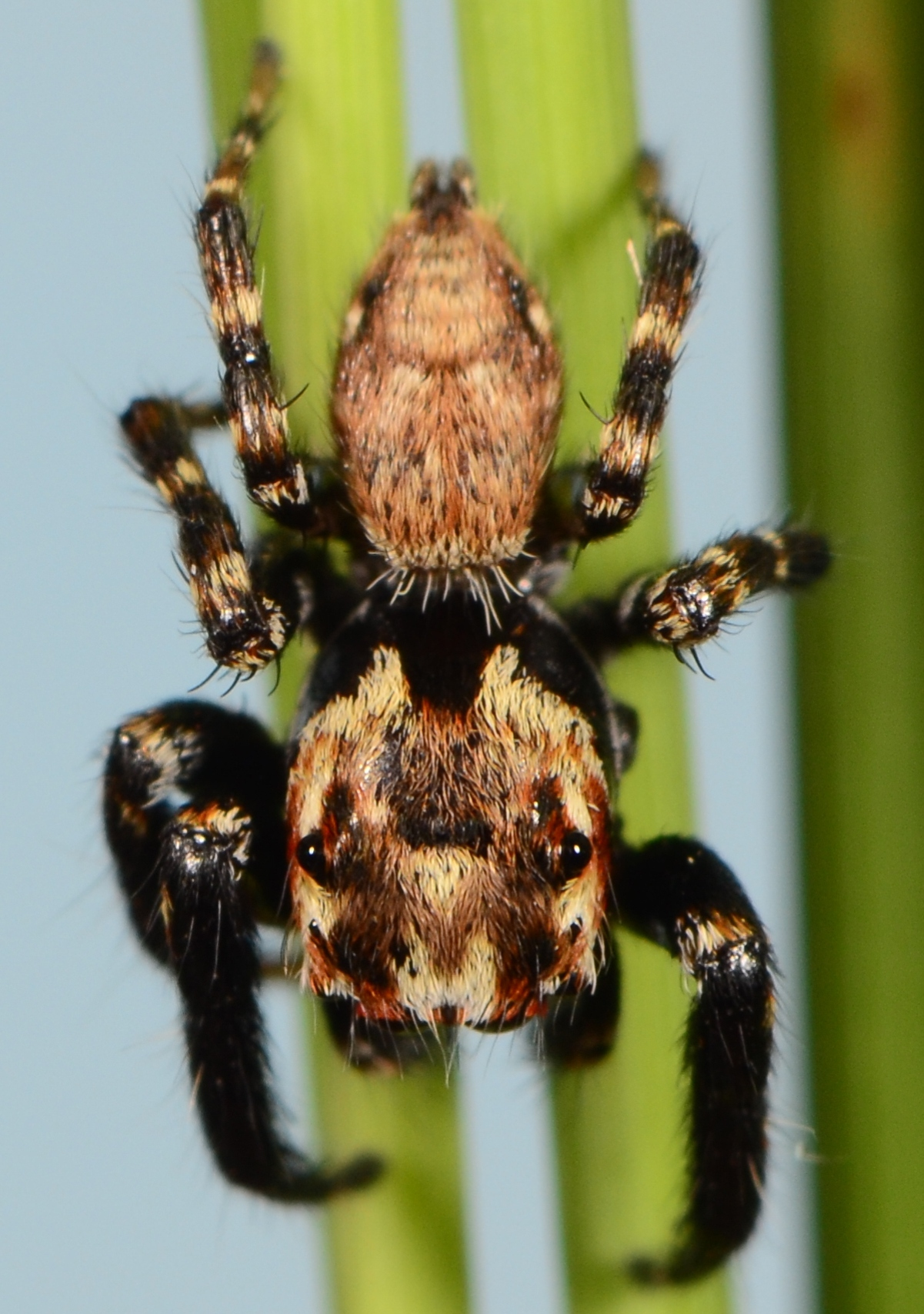
- male Evarcha prosimilis from South Africa
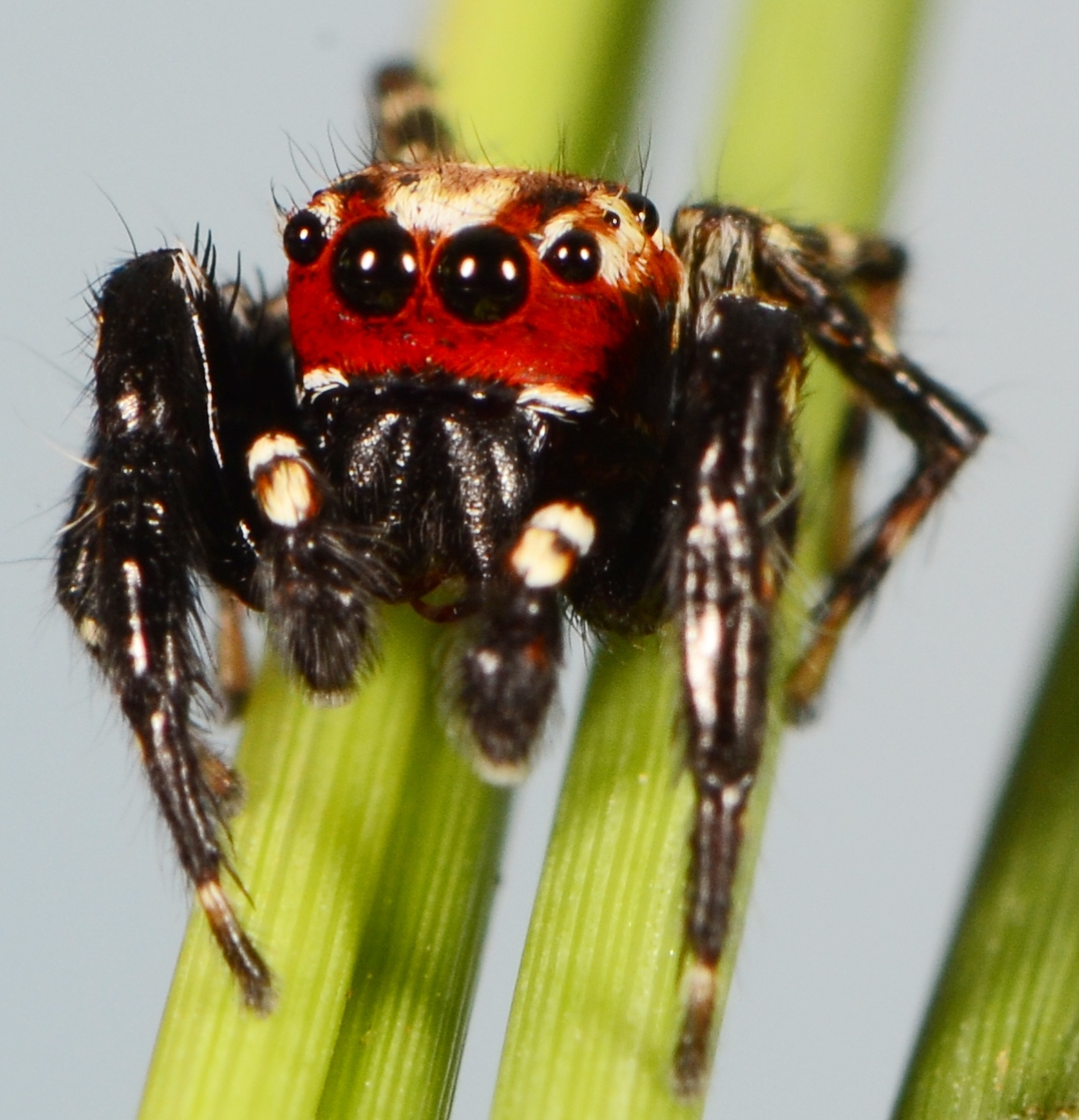
- male Evarcha prosimilis from South Africa

Scientific classification
- Kingdom: Animalia
- Phylum: Arthropoda
- Subphylum: Chelicerata
- Class: Arachnida
- Order: Araneae
- Infraorder: Araneomorphae
- Family: Salticidae
- Genus: Evarcha
- Species: E. prosimilis

Binomial name
- Evarcha prosimilis Wesołowska & Cumming, 2008

Synonyms
- Evawes prosimilis (Wesołowska & Cumming, 2008)

= Evarcha prosimilis =

Species of spider

Evarcha prosimilis is a species of jumping spider that lives in Kenya, South Africa, Tanzania, Uganda and Zimbabwe. It is ground-dwelling spider, thriving in leaf litter, but has also been observed living on the walls of houses and on grassy tussocks. More commonly found between November and April, the spider builds a nest of tightly-woven silk and will hunt flies and spiders, some of which are larger than itself. It is a small spider, with a carapace that ranges in length between 2.1 and 2.4 mm (0.08 and 0.09 in) and an abdomen that is between 1.7 and 3.2 mm (0.07 and 0.13 in) long. The female has a larger abdomen than the male and has a mottled pattern on its top consisting of whitish and brown patches or greyish-brown patches on a yellowish background. The species was first described in 2008 by Wanda Wesołowska and Meg Cumming, although examples had been found as early as 1938.

== Taxonomy ==
Evarcha prosimilis is a species of jumping spider, a member of the family Salticidae, that was first described by the arachnologists Wanda Wesołowska and Meg Cumming in 2008. It was one of over 500 species described by Wesołowska during her career. The male holotype was discovered in a house in Zimbabwe in 1999. An earlier example had been described in 2000 by Wesołowska and Anthony Russell-Smith, but had been misallocated to the species Evarcha similis. That description was based on a female found in 1996. They allocated it to the genus Evarcha, first circumscribed by Eugène Simon in 1902. The genus is one of the most specious, with members found on four continents.

In 1976, Jerzy Prószyński placed the genus Evarcha in the subfamily Pelleninae, along with the genera Bianor and Pellenes. In Wayne Maddison's 2015 study of spider phylogenetic classification, the genus Evarcha was moved to the subtribe Plexippina. Plexippina is a member of the tribe Plexippini, which was listed in the subclade Simonida in the clade Saltafresia by Maddison. In 2016, Jerzy Prószyński added the genus to a group of genera named Evarchines along with Hasarinella and Nigorella based on similarities in the spiders' copulatory organs. According to Maddison, Melissa Bodner and Karen Needham, the genus is closely related to the genera Hyllus and Plexippus. Analysis of protein-coding genes showed it is particularly related to Telamonia.

Prószyński placed the spider in a new genus Evawes in 2018 based on its copulatory organs and the way that they differ from other Evarcha spiders. The new genus name is a combination of Evacha and Wesołowska. This designation is not widely accepted and the species remains in the Evarcha genus in the World Spider Catalog.

== Description ==
Evarcha prosimilis is a small spider with a body divided into two main parts: an almost rectangular oval cephalothorax and a larger and more rounded abdomen. The male has a carapace, the hard upper part of the cephalothorax, that is between 2.1 and 2.4 mm (0.08 and 0.09 in) long and 1.6 and 1.9 mm (0.06 and 0.07 in) wide. It is rather high and generally brown with darker streaks running down the middle. The eye field is darker, although a scattering of white hairs forms a patch between the central eyes. The area around the eyes themselves is black. There are orange scales near some of the eyes. The underside of the cephalothorax, or sternum, is yellowish-orange or orange-brown. The spider's face, or clypeus, is high, brown and covered in orange-reddish hairs. The spider's mouthparts, including the labium and chelicerae, are dark brown.

The male spider's abdomen is between 1.7 and 2.1 mm (0.07 and 0.08 in) long and 1.3 and 1.4 mm (0.05 and 0.06 in) wide. It is-brownish on top with an ill-defined pattern of two yellow streaks crossing the front, a leaf-like pattern in the middle and two spots at the back. A covering of brown and yellowish hairs adorns the surface. The underside is generally yellow or dark and marked with a pattern of small light dots making four lines running from front to back. The spinnerets are greyish. It has legs that are mainly brown or yellow, with the front two pairs darker than the rest. There are rings visible on some of the joints. The legs have brown hairs and long spines.

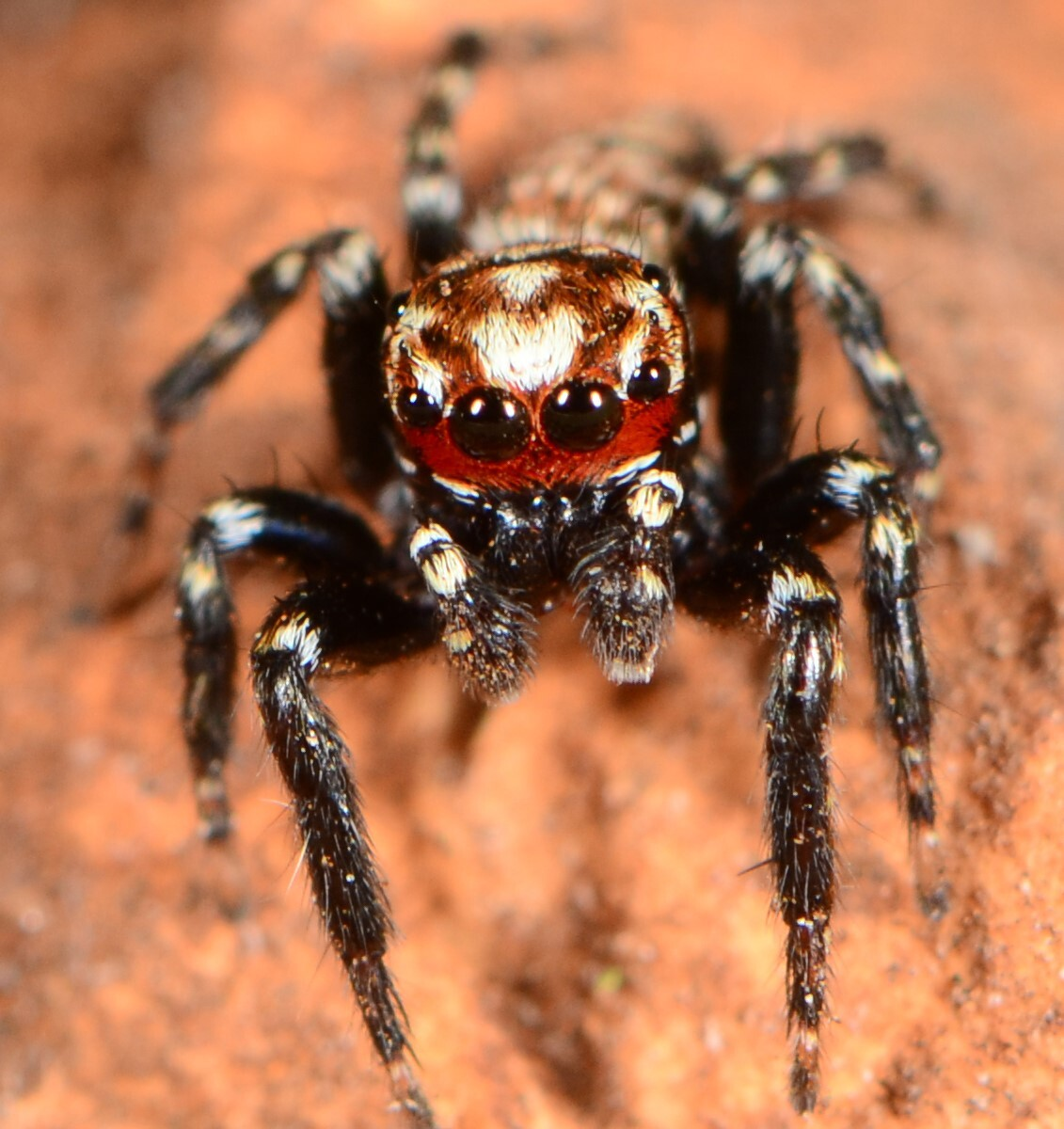
male

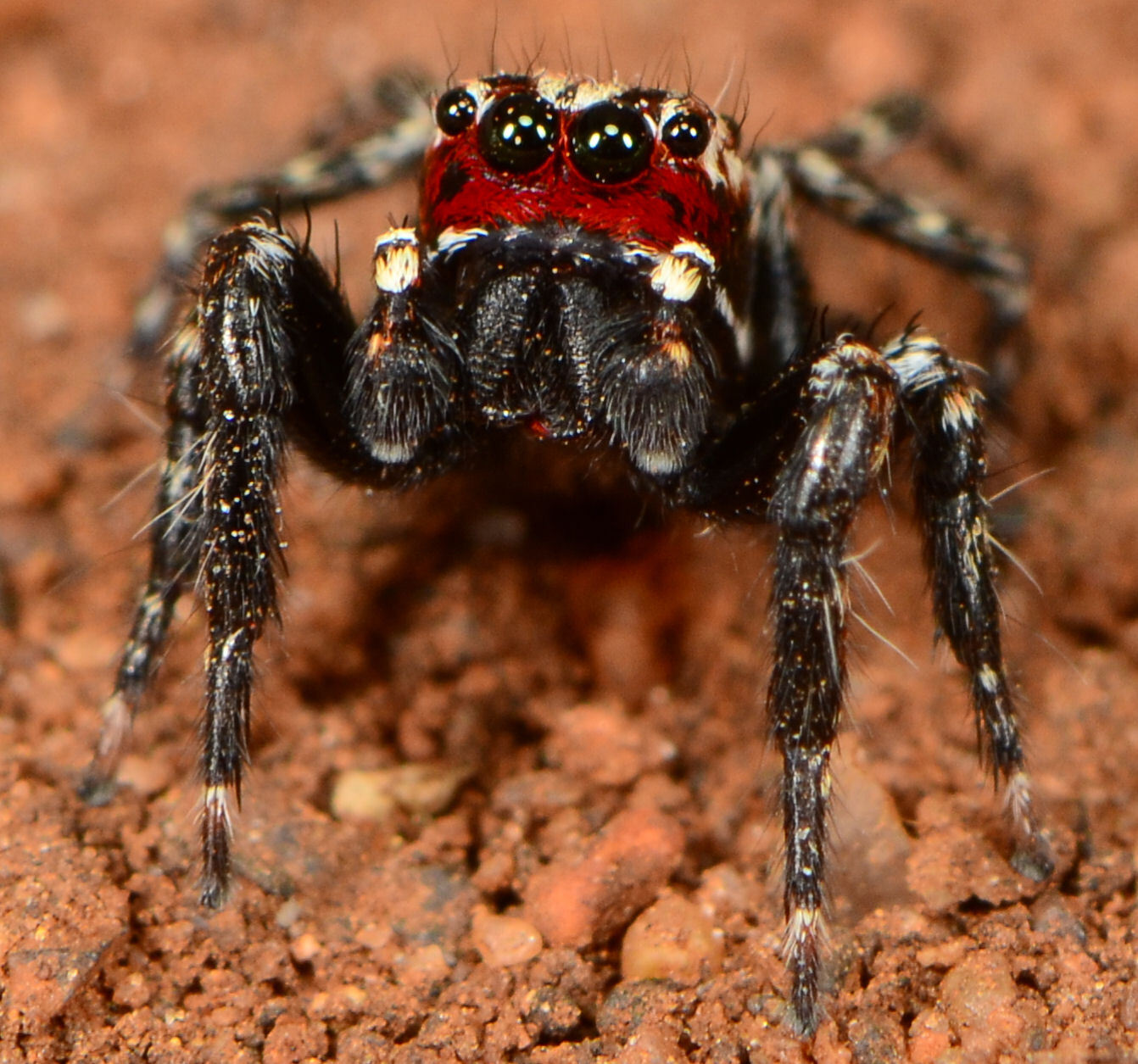
male

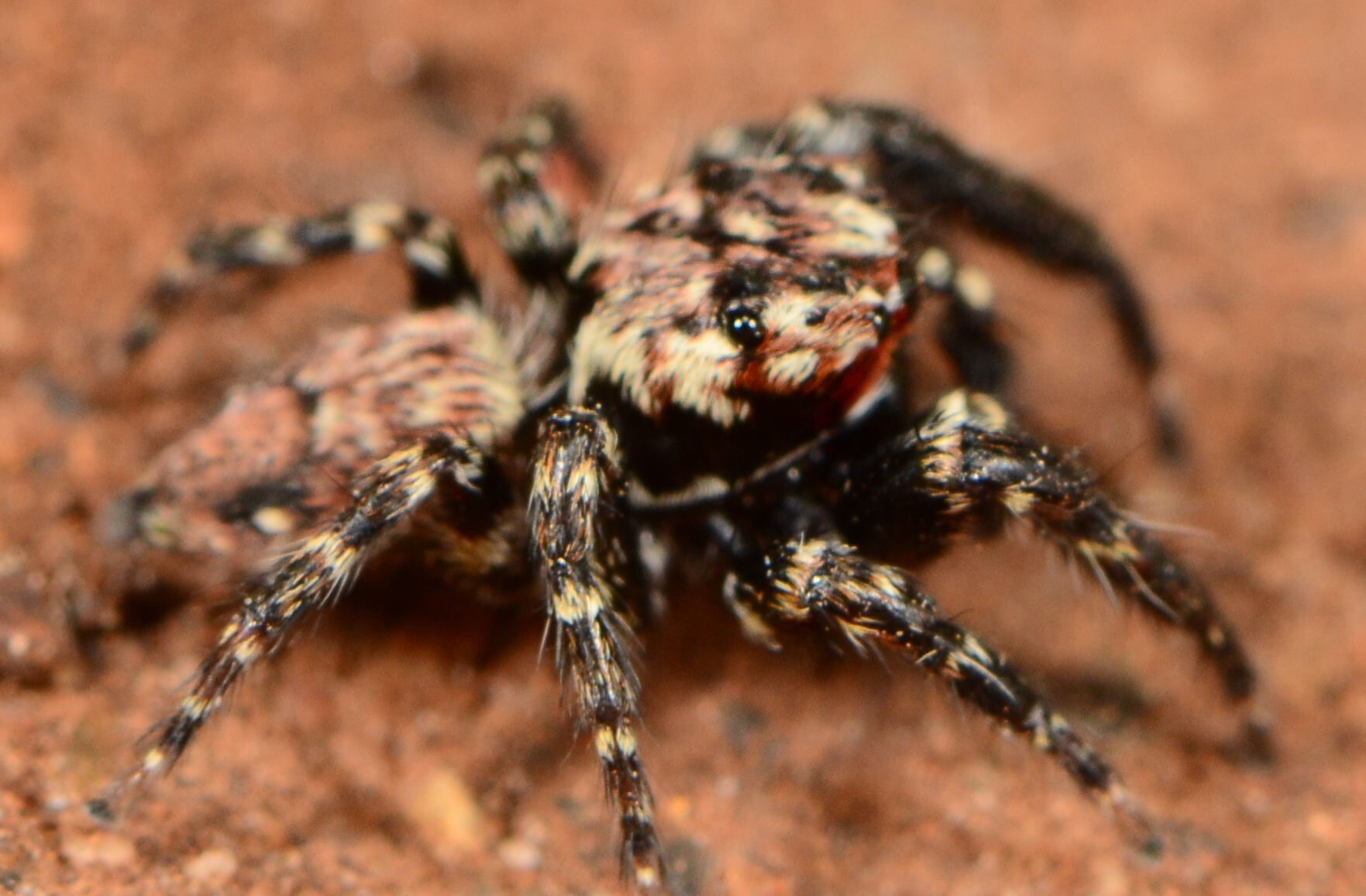
male

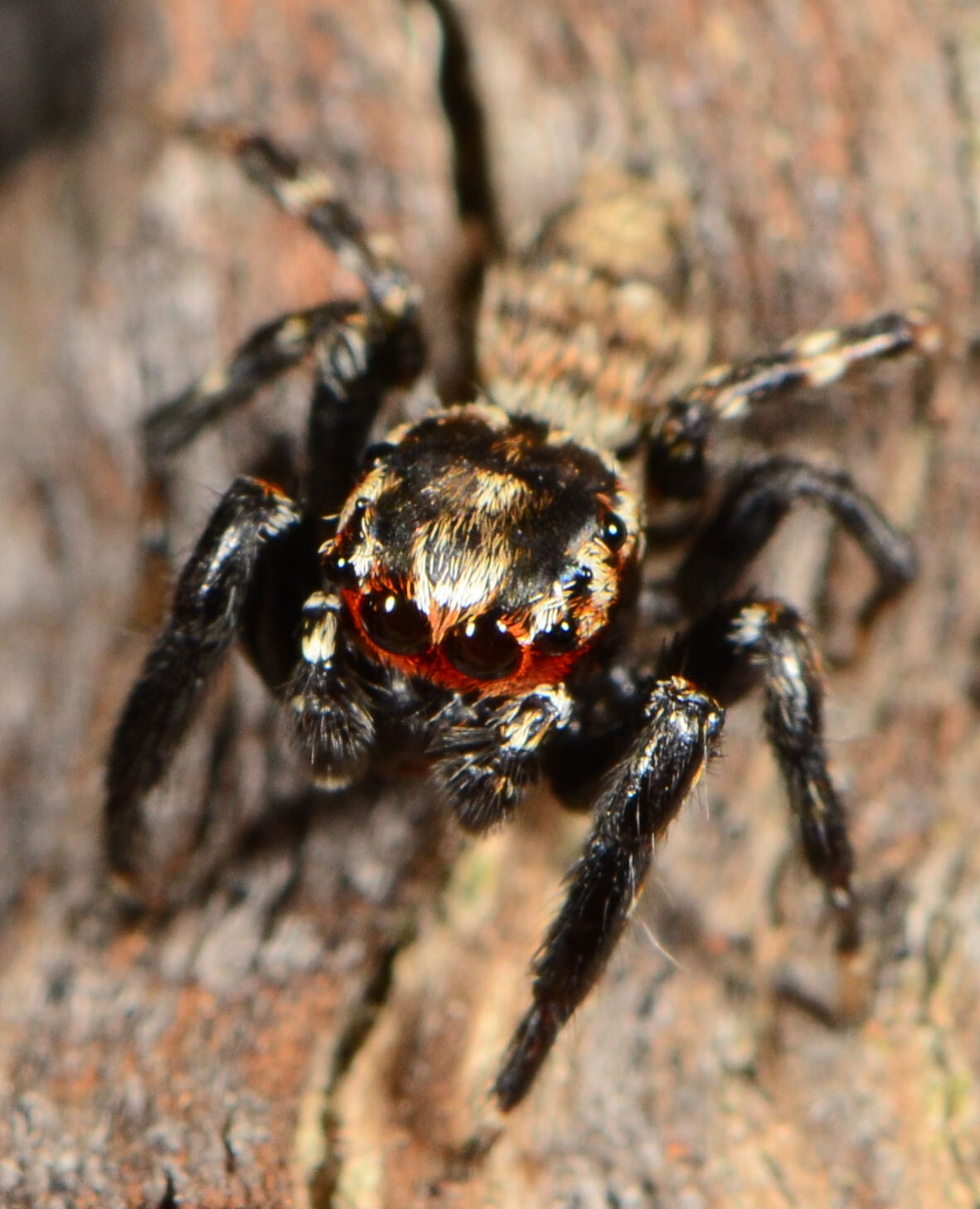
male

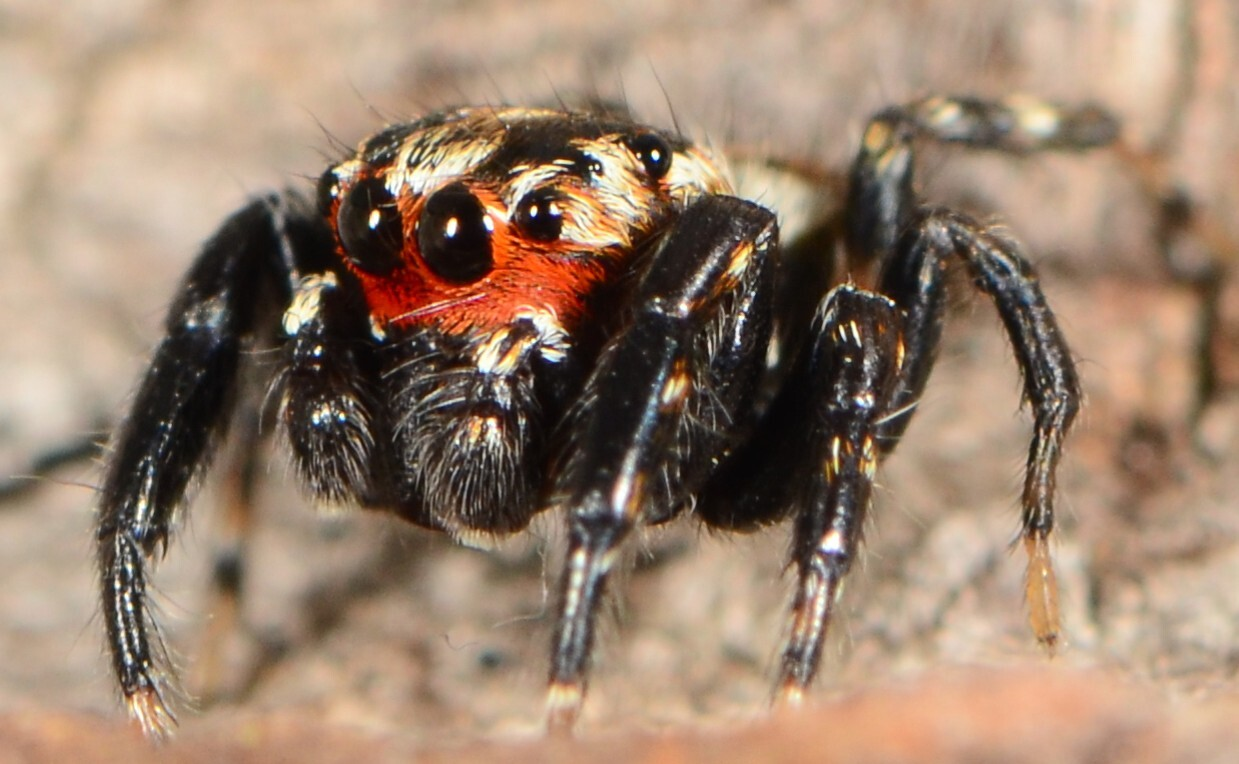
male

The male's copulatory organs are distinctive. The pedipalps, sensory organs near the mouth, are brown with a scattering of white hairs on the palpal femur and the patella. The cymbium is wider to the bottom with an irregular convex side and a straight side, the latter being mainly covered by an even more irregularly-shaped palpal bulb. The palpal bulb has a prominent bulge at the bottom and a long thin double embolus emanating from near the top and curving alongside it to follow the shape of the bulb to project near to the top. There is a forked protrusion on the palpal tibia, or tibial apophysis. It is the copulatory organs that help telling the spider apart from the related and otherwise similar Evarcha culicivora and Evarcha picta. The male has a shorter embolus than the former and a wider tibial apophysis than the latter.

The female is similar in size to the male, with a carapace that is typically 2.3 mm (0.09 in) long and between 1.7 and 2 mm (0.07 and 0.08 in) wide. It is generally brown with an orange-brown thorax, which is darker at the edges, has grey hairs on its slopes and is marked by two white lines running towards the back. The eye field is darker like the male and has light hairs forming lines that run between the eyes. Small fawn scales surround the frontmost eyes, The sternum is yellowish-brown or yellowish. The clypeus is low and brown with a thin line of white hairs running along its edge. The chelicerae are brown, the remaining mouthparts being lighter with white tips.

The female spider's abdomen is larger than the males and measures between 2.9 and 3.2 mm (0.11 and 0.13 in) in length and 2.2 and 2.4 mm (0.09 and 0.09 in) in width. The mottled pattern on its top is made up of small whitish and brown patches or greyish-brown patches on a yellowish background. The top is covered in brownish and grey hairs and a scattering of brown bristles. A few darker chevrons can be seen towards the back on some specimens. The underside is light and mottled with brown patches. It has dark grey spinnerets and brown legs that are marked with rings like the male and have brown spines and hairs. The spider's pedipalps are brown like the male. Its epigyne, the visible part of the female copulatory organs, is small with strong sclerotization. There are two copulatory openings that are weakly sclerotized at the initial stage and then less so as they travel down to the multi-chambered spermathecae, or receptacles.

== Behaviour and habitat ==
Evarcha prosimilis has been observed more frequently between November and April, during or after rainy weather. It generally lives in leaf litter or within sedges and other low vegetation. The spider has also been found hidden beneath stones on steppes of Combretum and Heeria argentea. It is particularly associated with the soil surface and living in grassy tussocks. It has specifically been found in leaf litter from Cussonia paniculata, Rhus lancea and Podocarpus trees. Some examples have been seen near rivers and at the edge of forests. It has also been observed living on walls.

Evarcha spiders hunt by ambushing their prey, feeding on insects and other spiders. Evarcha prosimilis has been observed eating flies that are larger than itself, as well as long-jawed orb weaver spiders of the Metellina genus. The spider will create a nest made of tightly woven layers of silk that is tubular and located close to the ground amongst creepers and leaves. The female will remain in the nest while the offspring is very young. The spiders will also sow two leaves together to form the exterior to a retreat.

== Distribution ==
Evarcha spiders live across the world, although those found in North America may be accidental migrants. Evarcha prosimilis is endemic to Africa, living in the semi-arid central and subtropical eastern and northern parts of the south of the continent. It lives in Kenya, South Africa. Tanzania, Uganda and Zimbabwe. The spider has been found near the Umba river in the Mkomazi National Park in Tanzania, the first examples being found in 1995. The first specimens that were identified in Zimbabwe were found in a house in 1999. Others were found in the Sengwa Wildlife Research Area in 2001.

The first specimens of Evarcha prosimilis to be identified in South Africa were found in the Ndumo Game Reserve in 2002. It was also discovered living in the city of Bloemfontein and near the Erfenis Dam, as well as in the Free State National Botanical Garden, Golden Gate Highlands National Park, and Sandveld Nature Reserve, all in Free State. In 2009, the spider's range was extended to include North West province. Meanwhile, although they were not recognised as being part of the species at the time, examples of the spider had been discovered on Mount Elgon in Kenya as early as 1938. Not described until 2016, the spiders were found at an altitude of up to 2,100 m (6,900 ft) above sea level. In 2024, the spider was also described for the first time over the border in Uganda. The first specimen was one collected in 1994 on Rubaga, but others were subsequently found in ares around Entebbe and Lake Victoria.
