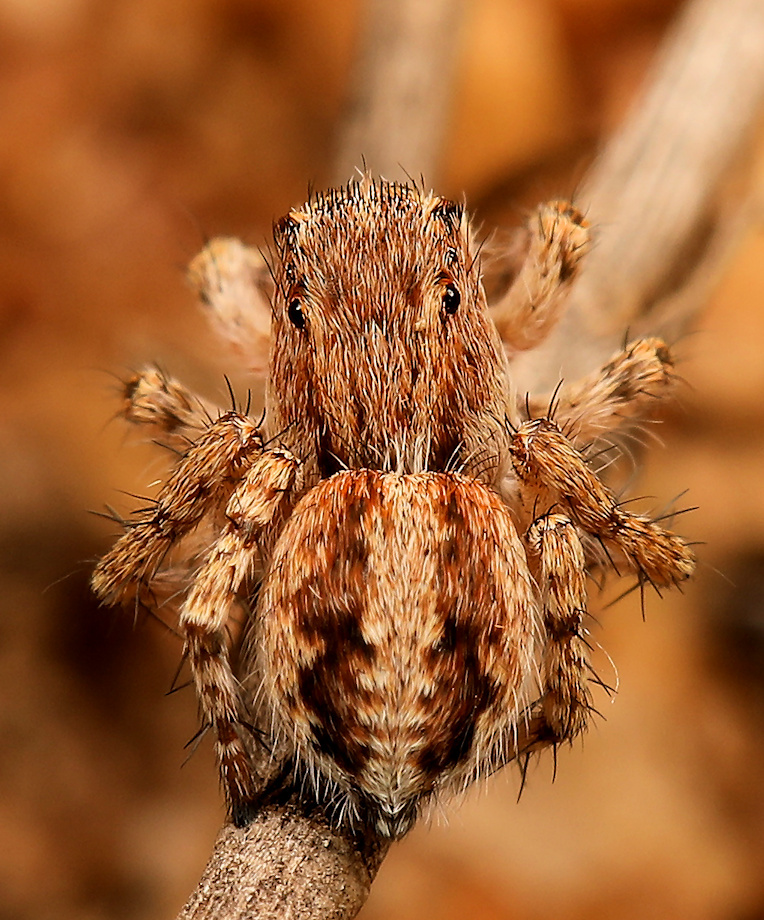

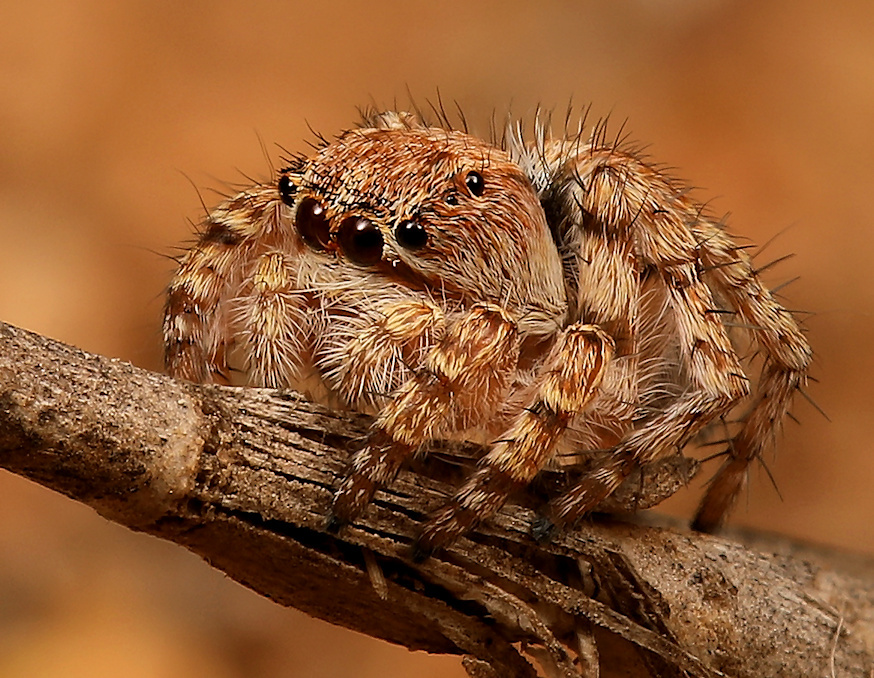

Scientific classification
- Kingdom: Animalia
- Phylum: Arthropoda
- Subphylum: Chelicerata
- Class: Arachnida
- Order: Araneae
- Infraorder: Araneomorphae
- Family: Salticidae
- Genus: Langona
- Species: L. hirsuta

Binomial name
- Langona hirsuta Haddad & Wesołowska, 2011

= Langona hirsuta =

Species of spider

Langona hirsuta is a species of jumping spider in the genus Langona that lives in South Africa. It was first described in 2011 by Charles Haddad and Wanda Wesołowska. The spider is large with a carapace between 2 and 3.7 mm (0.079 and 0.146 in) long and an abdomen between 1.9 and 4.4 mm (0.075 and 0.173 in) long. The female is significantly larger than the male, particularly in the abdomen, which is also wider and a lighter brown. The male has very hairy pedipalps, after which it is named. It has the toothless chelicerae typical of the genus, and a single appendage, or apophysis, on the palpal tibia. The length of the apophysis helps to distinguish it from other spiders in the genus. It lives in semi-arid climates.

== Taxonomy ==
Langona hirsuta is a jumping spider that was first described by Wanda Wesołowska and Charles Haddad in 2011. It isone of over 500 species identified by the Polish arachnologist Wesołowska during her career. The species was placed in the genus Langona, first described by Eugène Simon in 1901. It was listed in the subtribe Aelurillina in the tribe Aelurillini by Wayne Maddison in 2015. These were allocated to the clade Saltafresia. In 2017, the genus was grouped with nine other genera of jumping spiders under the name Aelurillines. It is particularly closely related to the genus Aelurillus, after which the group is named. Haddad and Wesołowska saw the position of the species in Aelurillina as uncertain as it has many features that were not found in other spiders, even genera other than Langona. The name of the species is based on a Latin word meaning hairy, and relates to the hairy pedipalps of the male.

== Description ==
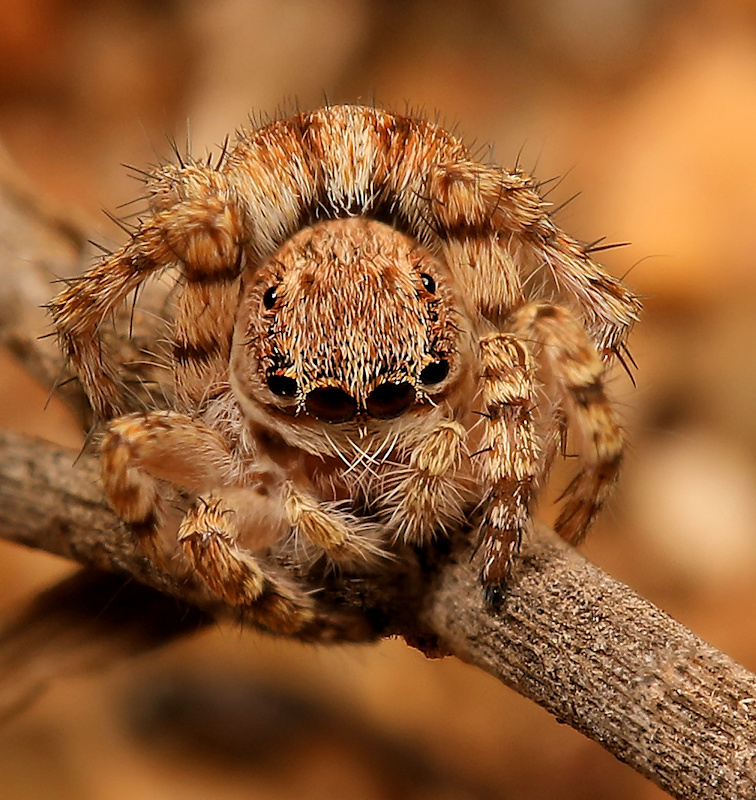

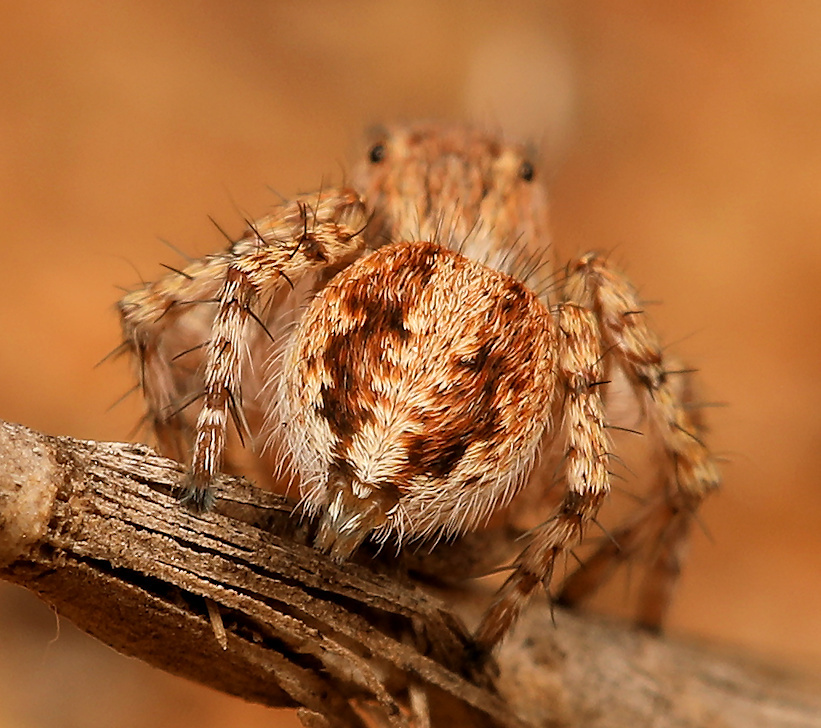

Langona hirsuta is large and hairy. The male has a carapace that is between 2 and 2.1 mm (0.079 and 0.083 in) in length and 1.5 and 1.7 mm (0.059 and 0.067 in) in width. The carapace is quite high, oval, dark brown and hairy. The abdomen is a black-brown oval. It is between 1.9 and 2 mm (0.075 and 0.079 in) long and between 1.4 and 1.5 mm (0.055 and 0.059 in) wide. The black eye field is short and bristled. On some specimens, there is a vague pattern on light streaks on the eye field. The underside is a lighter brown. The clypeus is brown with dark hairs and the chelicerae are toothless. The legs are yellow to brown and spiney. The forward spinnerets are dark and the rearmost are pale. The pedipalps are brown and very hairy. The cymbium is narrow. The pedipalp tibia has a single apophysis, or appendage and the palpal bulb has a triangular lobe at the rear. The embolus is hidden between the bulb and cymbium. It is also coiled, very long and thin.

The female is larger than the male, with a carapace that is between 3.2 and 3.7 mm (0.13 and 0.15 in) long and between 2.5 and 2.8 mm (0.098 and 0.110 in) wide. The abdomen is particularly larger, being between 4.1 and 4.4 mm (0.16 and 0.17 in) in length and between 3.5 and 4 mm (0.14 and 0.16 in) in width. The carapace is shaped like a pear, high and covered with dense white hairs. The abdomen is much wider and looks swollen. It is very light brown and has short brown and orange hairs. In some specimens there is a pattern of three light spots surrounding an irregular streak across the middle of the abdomen. There are sometimes dark diagonal patches on the sides. The epigyne has two hollows that are shaped like sickles. The seminal ducts are wide and coiled, which lead to large receptacles that are many-chambered.

Like other Lagona spiders, the chelicerae are toothless. and there is a single appendage on the pedipalp tibia, which enables it to be distinguished from other Aelurillinae. The different Langona species generally cannot be distinguished from each other or from other members of the group by either their colours or the patterns that appear on their bodies, but by the structure of the copulatory organs. It is particularly similar to Lagona bitumorata, although that spider is found in Tanzania. The species can be distinguished by the long dense hairs on the tibial apophysis. It resembles the related Langona sabulosa, but may be identified by its longer tibial palpal apophysis and wider palpal bulb as well as its brown hairy pedipalps.

== Distribution and habitat ==
Langona hirsuta is endemic to South Africa. The holotype was found in the nature reserve near Erfenis Dam, Free State, in 2009. Other examples have been identified in Free State National Botanical Garden, the area around Krugersdrift Dam, Sandveld Nature Reserve, as well as farms near to Brandfort Boshof, Bothaville and Kimberley. It has also been discovered in the Lekgalameetse Provincial Park in Limpopo. It is common in semi-arid regions. It Is ground-dwelling, and has been observed to live under rocks.
