= Debeerspruit =

Small stream in the Free State, South Africa

Debeerspruit De Beersspruit
- Location of the Debeerspruit in the Free State

- Location of mouth in the Free State Debeerspruit (South Africa)

Location
- Country: South Africa
- Province: Free State
- District municipality: Thabo Mofutsanyana
- Local municipalities: Setsoto, Dihlabeng

Physical characteristics
- Source
  - coordinates: 28°09′52″S 27°44′55″E
- Mouth
  - coordinates: 28°21′34.3″S 27°52′10.8″E
- Length: about 24 km

Basin features
- River system: Orange River

Debeerspruit is a small stream in the central interior of the Free State, South Africa. The name Debeerspruit appears on Getamap.net,. and is also listed by GeoNames.org. It forms part of the Orange River watershed and is a tributary of the Sand River (Free State), which itself feeds into the Vaal River.

== Geography ==
Debeerspruit flows near the town of Senekal, which lies just north of the stream's course. It is a recognisable feature on local maps and within the surrounding farming areas. The N5 road (connecting Senekal and Paul Roux) crosses the Debeerspruit and serves as a key route for the region.

The stream originates near 28°09′52″S 27°44′55″E / (-28.164813, 27.749059), within the Setsoto Local Municipality, at an elevation of approximately 1,472 metres (4,829 ft). From its source, it flows southeast, traversing rural land between Arlington and Senekal, and heading towards Rosendal. It enters the Dihlabeng Local Municipality around 28°21′34.3″S 27°52′10.8″E.

A road sign at the crossing simply reads "De Beer", likely a shortened form of "Debeerspruit", as the nearby landscape and map context make the full name unnecessary. This sign is visible on the N5 between Senekal and Paul Roux and can be viewed on Google Street View.

== Hydrology ==
Debeerspruit branches off from the Sand River, a tributary of the Vaal River, which is part of the Orange River system, South Africa's largest river basin. The stream falls within the Orange–Senqu River Basin, which is managed by the Orange–Senqu River Commission (ORASECOM) to support fair and sustainable use of shared water resources.

== Significance ==
Though minor in size, Debeerspruit contributes to local agricultural hydrology and falls within the Upper Orange Water Management Area.

The stream is also noted in historical and regional sources, including "A History of the Batswana and Origin of Certain Customs" (p. 357) and "The War Letters of an English Burgher" (p. 11), written by Ferrar Reginald Mostyn Cleaver (also known as Reggie Cleaver). Cleaver was born on a farm at Zuringkrans near Debeerspruit and was later held as a Boer prisoner at the Diyatalawa concentration camp in Ceylon, where he died in 1900.

In addition, Debeerspruit is listed in official geographical sources such as Amptelike plekname in die Unie en Suidwes-Afrika (p. 89), which provides official place names in South Africa.

== Etymology ==
The name Debeerspruit is formed from "De Beer," which is a common surname of Dutch origin, and "spruit", meaning "stream" or "brook" in Afrikaans. The use of both elements together—De Beer and spruit—can be understood as "De Beer’s stream."

No other formal names for the stream have been recorded, though variations such as “De Beer Spruit” or “De Beer se spruit” may appear in informal or local usage, particularly in spoken Afrikaans.
