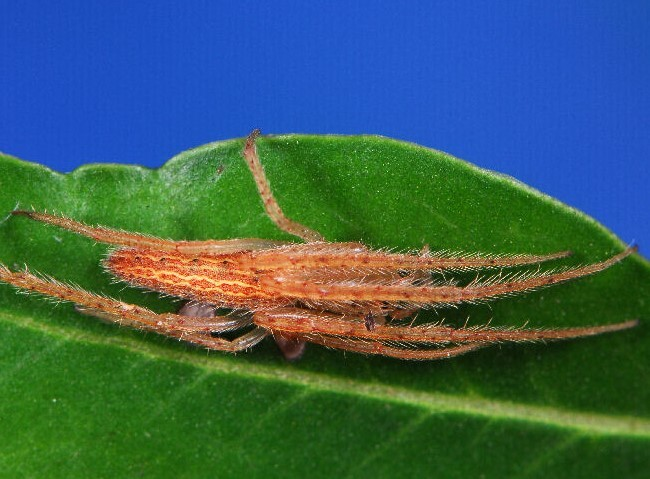
- female from South Africa
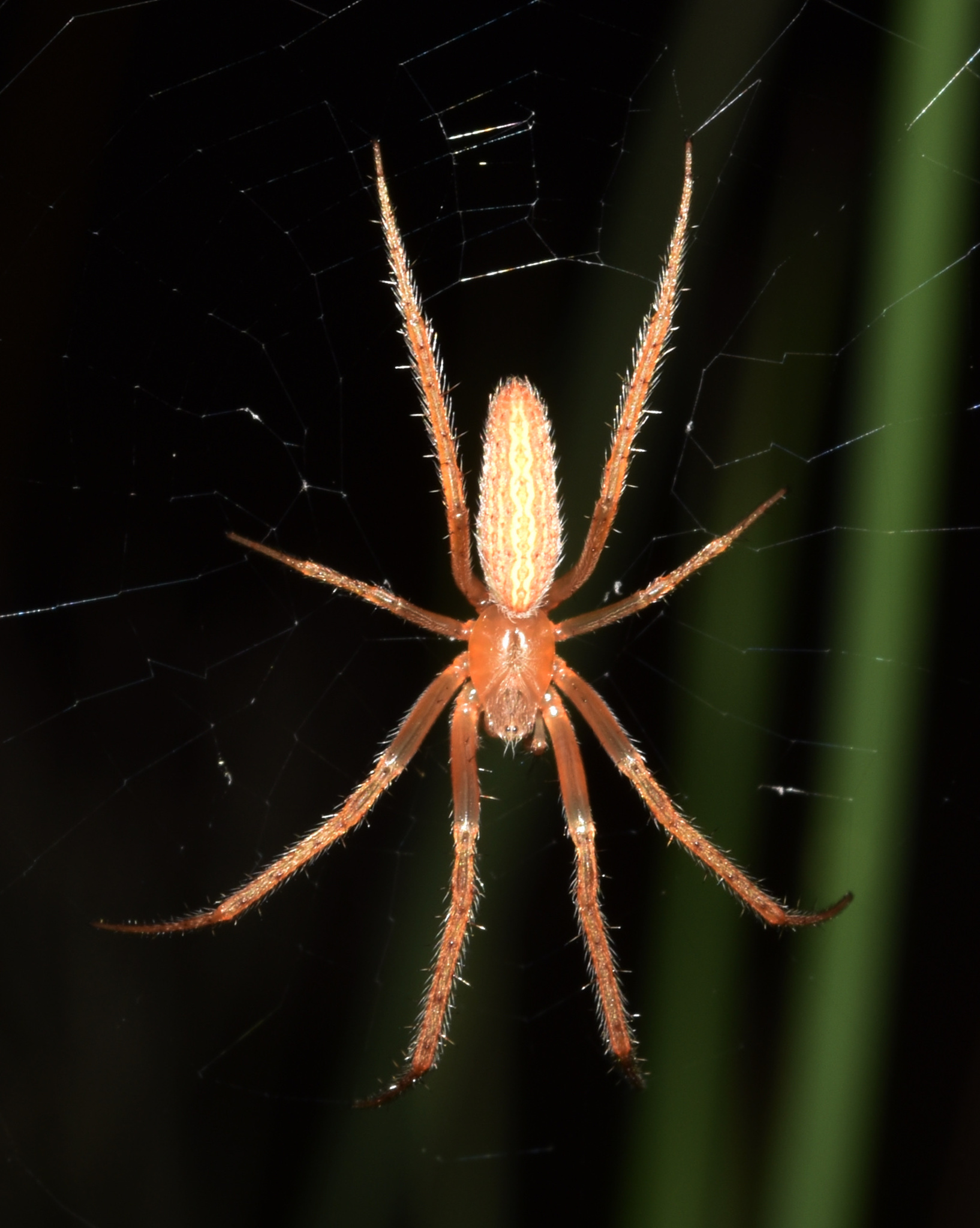

Scientific classification
- Kingdom: Animalia
- Phylum: Arthropoda
- Subphylum: Chelicerata
- Class: Arachnida
- Order: Araneae
- Infraorder: Araneomorphae
- Family: Araneidae
- Genus: Mahembea; Grasshoff, 1970
- Species: M. hewitti

Binomial name
- Mahembea hewitti (Lessert, 1930)

= Mahembea =

Hewitt's Grass Orb-Web Spider

Genus of spider

Mahembea is a genus of African orb-weaver spiders containing the single species, Mahembea hewitti. The species is found in Central and East Africa. It is commonly known as Hewitt's grass orb-web spider.

== Distribution ==
Mahembea hewitti has a distribution from the Democratic Republic of the Congo to South Africa. The species is under-collected and is suspected to occur in more countries.

In South Africa, the species is known from five provinces, Gauteng, KwaZulu-Natal, Limpopo, Mpumalanga, and North West. Notable locations include Polokwane Nature Reserve, Legalameetse Nature Reserve, iSimangaliso Wetland Park, and Kgaswane Mountain Reserve.

== Habitat and ecology ==
Mahembea hewitti inhabits Forest, Indian Ocean Coastal Belt, and Savanna biomes at altitudes ranging from 29 to 1,556 m above sea level. The spider makes orb-webs in grass and has been sampled from sugar cane fields.

== Description ==
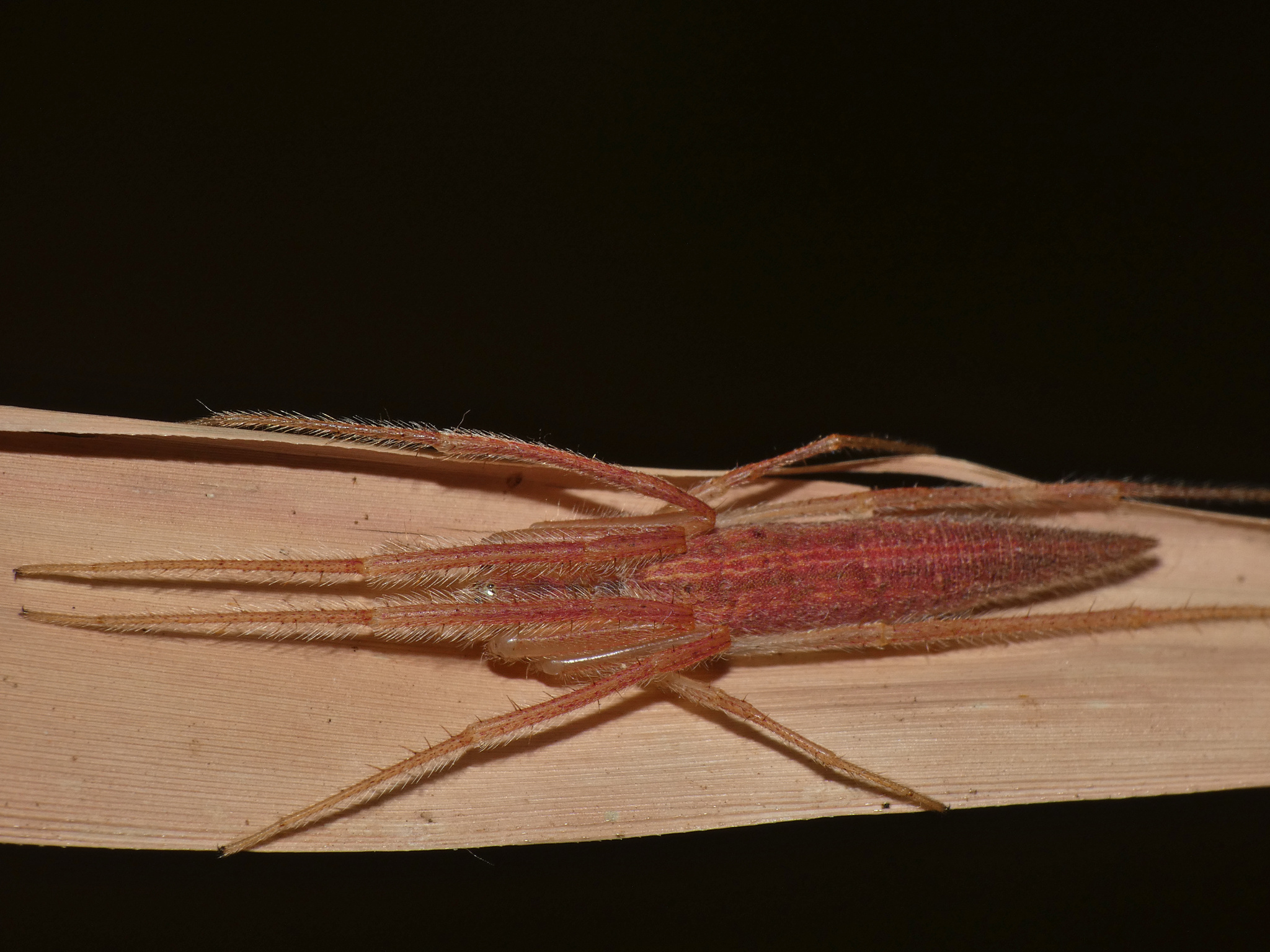

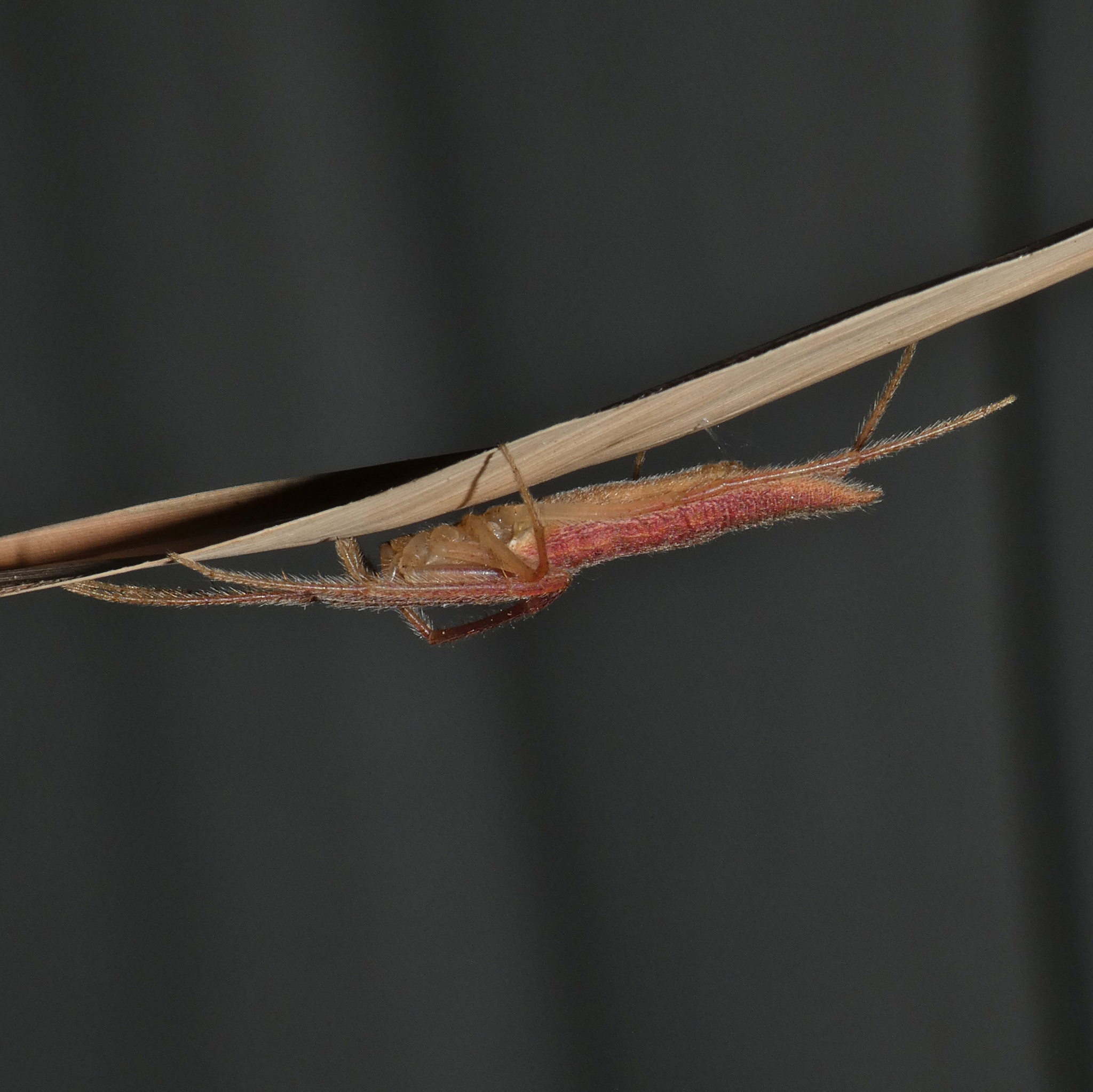

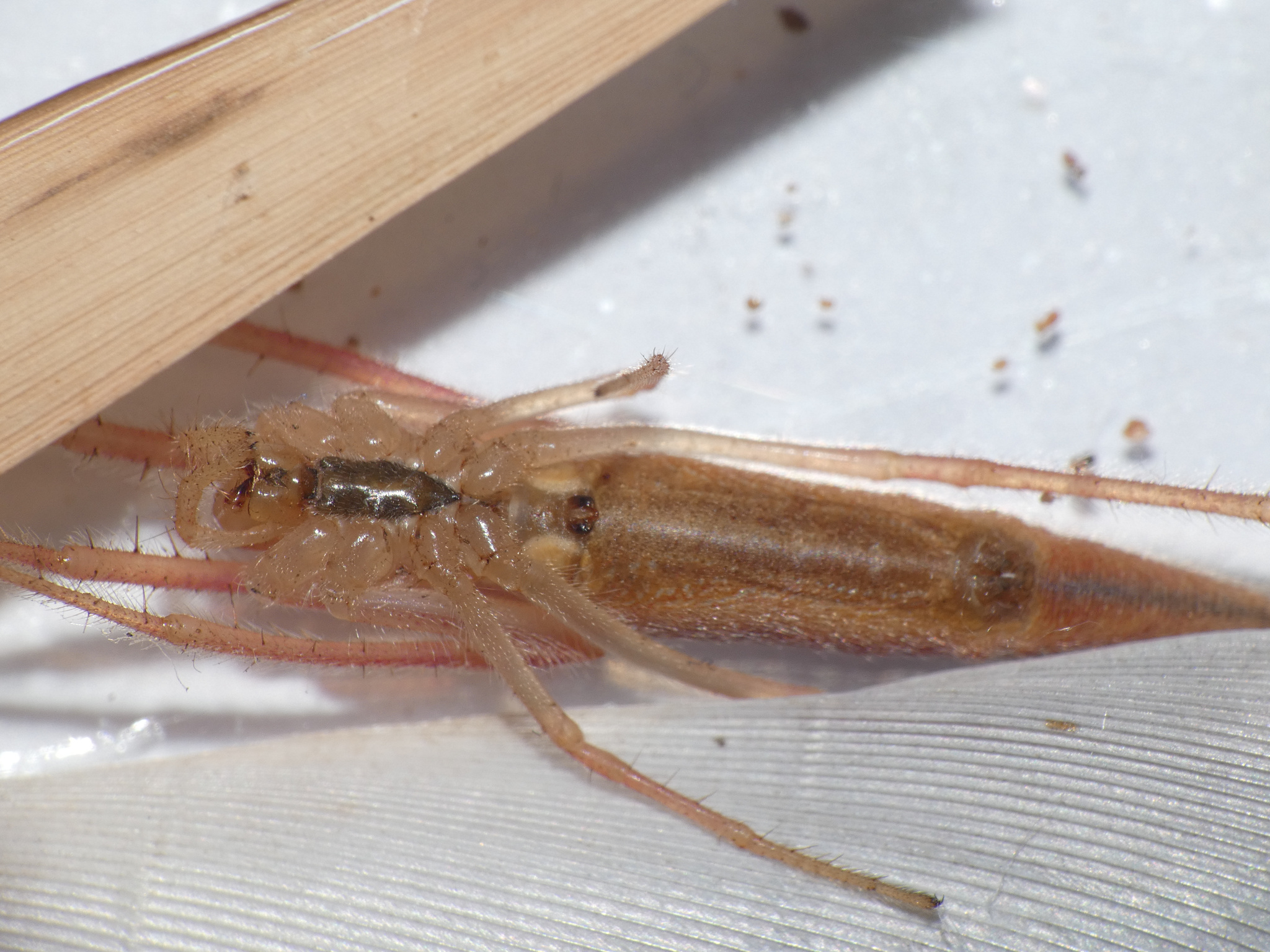

Female and male spiders measure 7-8 mm in total length. The carapace is elongate, straw coloured to yellow orange, with a median longitudinal band. The abdomen is elongate extending past spinnerets with thin paired longitudinal bands. Legs are the same colour as body and bear setae with dark spots at their bases.

== Conservation ==
Mahembea hewitti is listed as Least Concern by the South African National Biodiversity Institute due to its wide geographical range. There are no known threats to the species. The species is protected in more than six protected areas including Polokwane Nature Reserve, Legalameetse Nature Reserve, and Roodeplaat Dam Nature Reserve.

== Etymology ==
The species is named after John Hewitt, a South African herpetologist and arachnologist who made significant contributions to the study of southern African fauna.

== Taxonomy ==
The species was originally described by Roger de Lessert in 1930 from the Democratic Republic of the Congo as Larinia hewittii.

The genus was first created by Manfred Grasshoff in 1970 to separate this species from its original genus, Larinia. Known from both sexes.
