= North West Parks and Tourism Board =

Tourism in South Africa

The North West Parks Board is a governmental organisation responsible for the management of protected areas and public nature reserves in North West Province, South Africa.

The different reserves are scattered throughout the province, each with its unique features. Activities within the reserves are available for educational, recreation and enjoyment of both outdoor adventure enthusiasts and those who want a break away from the crowd.

With the exception of Madikwe Game Reserve, all the reserves are open to day visitors and no prior booking is necessary.

Accommodation range from rustic farm houses, tented camps, caravan and camping sites. In reserves where facilities are not provided, these are different privately owned accommodation either on the periphery of the reserves or in nearby towns.

== Parks managed by North West Parks and Tourism Board ==
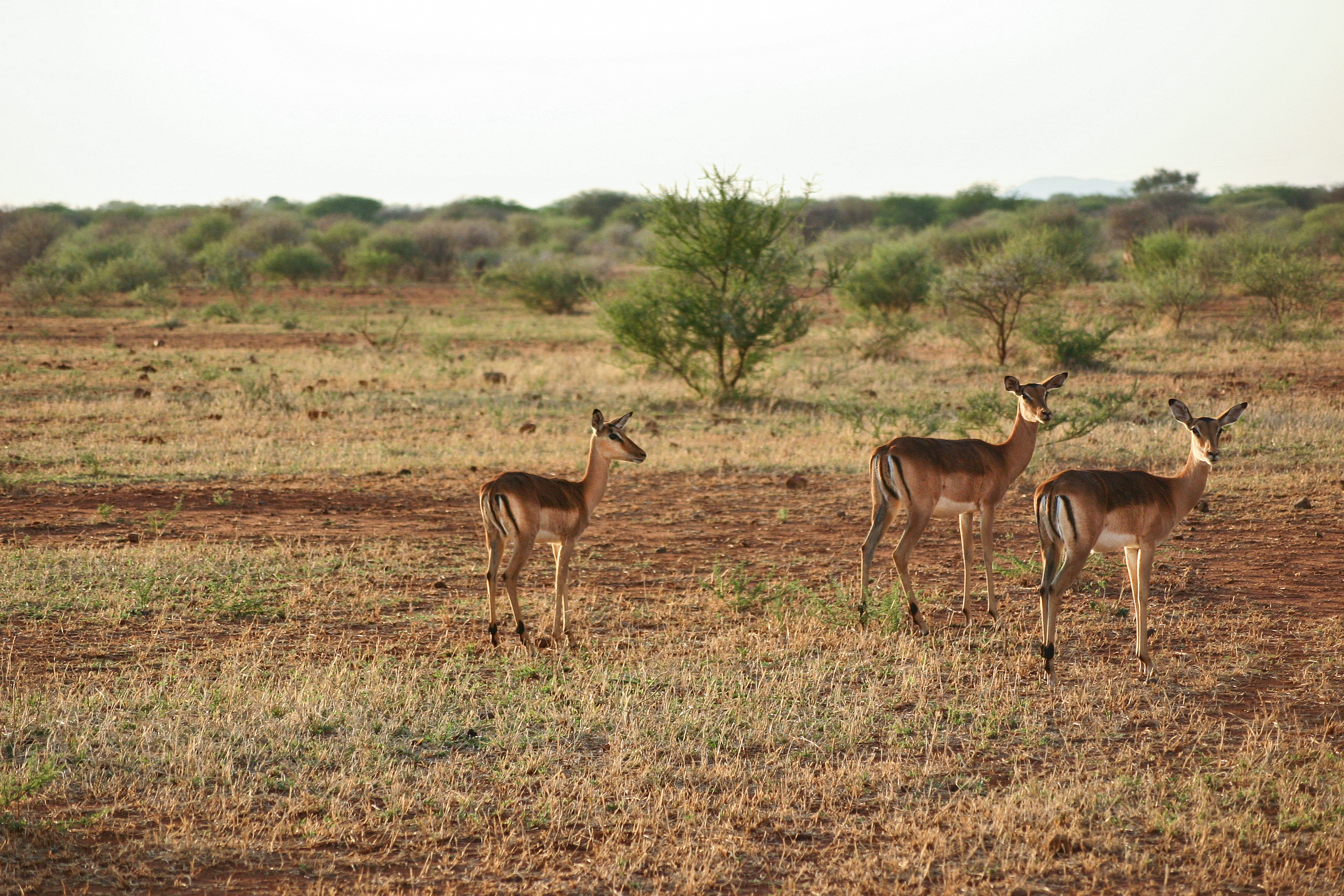
A group of Impala in the Madikwe Game Reserve

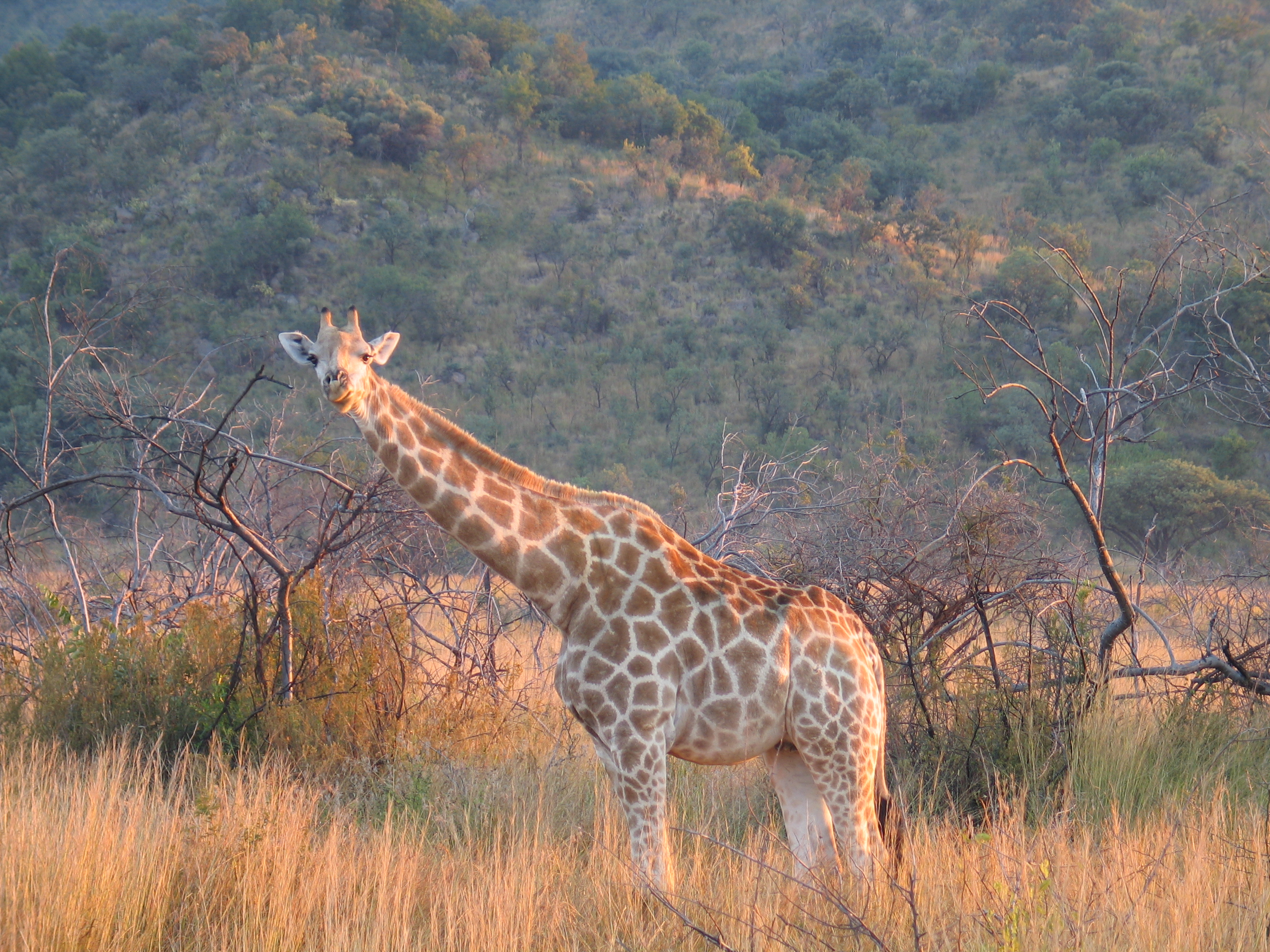
A giraffe in the Pilanesberg National Park

- Barberspan Bird Sanctuary
- Bloemhof Dam Nature Reserve
- Borakalalo National Reserve
- Boskop Nature Reserve
- Botsalano Game Reserve
- Kgaswane Mountain Reserve
- Madikwe Game Reserve
- Mafikeng Game Reserve
- Molemane Eye Nature Reserve
- Molopo Game Reserve
- Pilanesberg National Park
- S.A. Lombard Nature Reserve
- Vaalkop Dam Nature Reserve
- Wolwespruit Dam Reserve

== See also ==
- South African National Parks
- Protected areas of South Africa
