= Bloemhof =

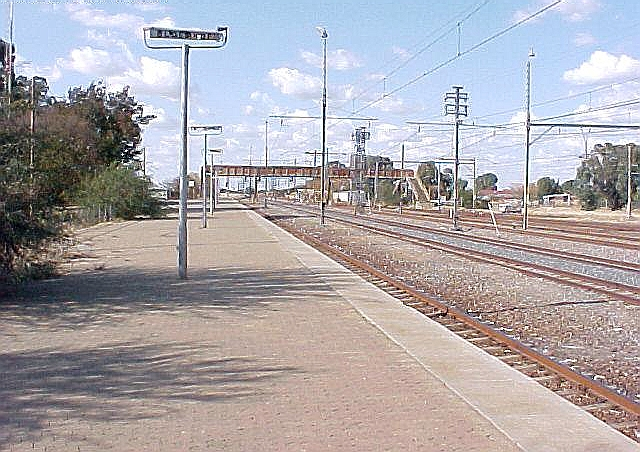
- Bloemhof railway station

- Location within North West (South African province) Location within South Africa
- Coordinates: 27°39′0″S 25°35′24″E
- Country: South Africa
- Province: North West
- District: Dr Ruth Segomotsi Mompati
- Municipality: Lekwa-Teemane
- Established: 1864

Area
  - Total: 47.33 km^{2} (18.27 sq mi)

Population (2011)
  - Total: 2,339
  - Density: 49.42/km^{2} (128.0/sq mi)

Racial makeup (2011)
  - Black African: 26.5%
  - Coloured: 7.0%
  - Indian/Asian: 4.2%
  - White: 61.9%
  - Other: 0.4%

First languages (2011)
  - Afrikaans: 72.1%
  - Tswana: 7.4%
  - English: 7.3%
  - Sotho: 4.1%
  - Other: 8.9%
- Time zone: UTC+2 (SAST)
- Postal code (street): 2660
- PO box: 2660
- Area code: 053

Bloemhof is an agricultural town of about 2,000 inhabitants situated on the banks of the Vaal River in North West Province of South Africa.

== History ==
It was founded in August 1864 when diamonds were discovered in the area. The town was established on the farm owned by John Barclay, who survived the shipwreck of HMS Birkenhead in 1852. Like Bloemfontein, the place is named after Jan Bloem II (also known as Blumtseb or !Xāskx'aob) who was the right hand to the chief of the ǀŨdiǁʼais (Springbok clan) of the !Orakuana ("Korana") nation. In June 1869, the South African Republic's Volksraad created a new district called Bloemhof named after the town itself. Currently Bloemhof has a variety of social milieus; it has a township called Boitumelong and former coloured residence called Coverdale. Salamat is also a small residence, formerly an Indian suburb, which is situated in this town.

== Notable people ==
- Gabriel Matlhomola Molefe, a former Bloemfontein Celtics player was born in Bloemhof
- Terry Barwell a former cricketer was born in Bloemhof in 1937
- Jannes Labuschagne a former springbok player was born in Bloemhof
- Lieutenant-General Willem Louw (24 November 1920 – 4 July 1980) was a South African military commander. He joined the South African Army in the Special Service Battalion in 1938.
- Moosa Moolla (12 June 1934) TIC activist, member of COP National Secretariat, Treason trialist, 90 day detainee, MK and ANC member, editor of Spotlight, ANC Chief Representative in India, head of the ANC's Egypt and Middle East mission and the ANC representative on the Permanent Secretariat of the Afro-Asian Peoples Solidarity Organisation, recipient of the National Award, The Order of Luthuli, in Silver
- Juan-Philip Smith (born 30 March 1994) is a South African rugby union player for the Seattle Seawolves in Major League Rugby in the United States.
- Monnapule Saleng Orlando Pirates super star was born and bred in Bloemhof.

== Education ==
- Bloemhof Combined School
- Bloemhof primary School
- Boitumelong primary School
- Gaopalelwe Senior Secondary School
- Matlhajaneng Public Primary School
- Thamagane Primary School
- Thuto-Lore Secondary school
- Tshenolo Primary School
- Vaaloewer Combined School

== Tourist attractions ==
- Bloemhof Dam
- Bloemhof Dam Nature Reserve
- Sandveld Nature Reserve
- S.A. Lombard Nature Reserve
