= Bloemhof Dam =

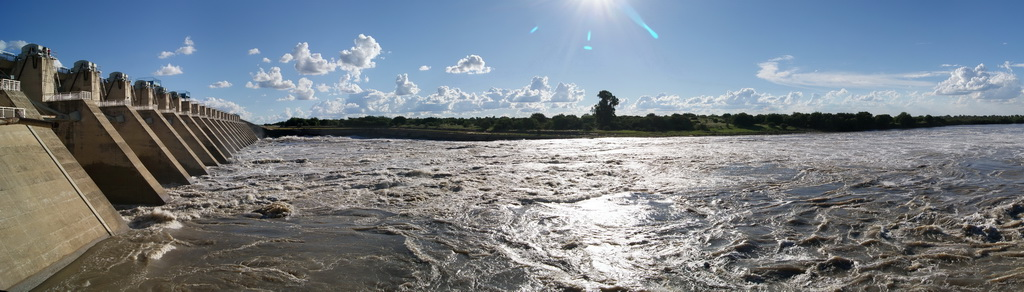

- Location within South Africa
- Interactive map of Bloemhof Dam
- Official name: Bloemhof Dam
- Country: South Africa
- Location: border of the North West and Free State
- Coordinates: 27°40′15″S 25°37′40″E
- Opening date: 1970
- Owner: Department of Water Affairs

Dam and spillways
- Type of dam: Concrete gravity with earth flanks
- Impounds: Vaal River
- Height: 33 m (108 ft)
- Length: 4,270 m (14,010 ft)
- Spillway type: Crest gate (controlled)
- Spillway capacity: 14 300 m³/s (max)

Reservoir
- Creates: Bloemhof Dam Reservoir
- Total capacity: 1 269 000 000 m³
- Surface area: 2226 ha

Bloemhof Dam is a dam in South Africa. It was originally known as the Oppermansdrif Dam when under construction during the late 1960s. It is located at the confluence of the Vaal River and the Vet River, on the border between the North West and Free State provinces. The dam wall has a total length of 4,270 metres (14,010 ft) The reservoir is very shallow, and therefore needs a large area to mean anything for water storage. The area around the reservoir (dam), has been a protected area, but because it lies on the border between provinces, these became two separate nature reserves. On the North West Province side lies the Bloemhof Dam Nature Reserve, on the Free State side is the Sandveld Nature Reserve.

The town of Bloemhof lies on the North West side of the Vaal River.

The dam was commissioned in 1970, has a capacity of 1,269,000,000 cubic metres (4.48×10^{10} cu ft), and has an area of 223 square kilometres (86 sq mi); the wall is 33 metres (108 ft) high. It is fed with the outflow from the Vaal Dam (located upstream in Gauteng) as well as rain collected in the Vaal, Vet, Vals and Sand River catchment areas.

== See also ==
- List of reservoirs and dams in South Africa
- List of rivers of South Africa
