= Boesmans River =

Boesmans River may refer to any of the following rivers in South Africa:

- Boesmans River (Eastern Cape)
- Boesmans River (Western Cape)
- Boesmans or Bushman's River, KwaZulu-Natal

== See also ==
- Boesmanspruit
