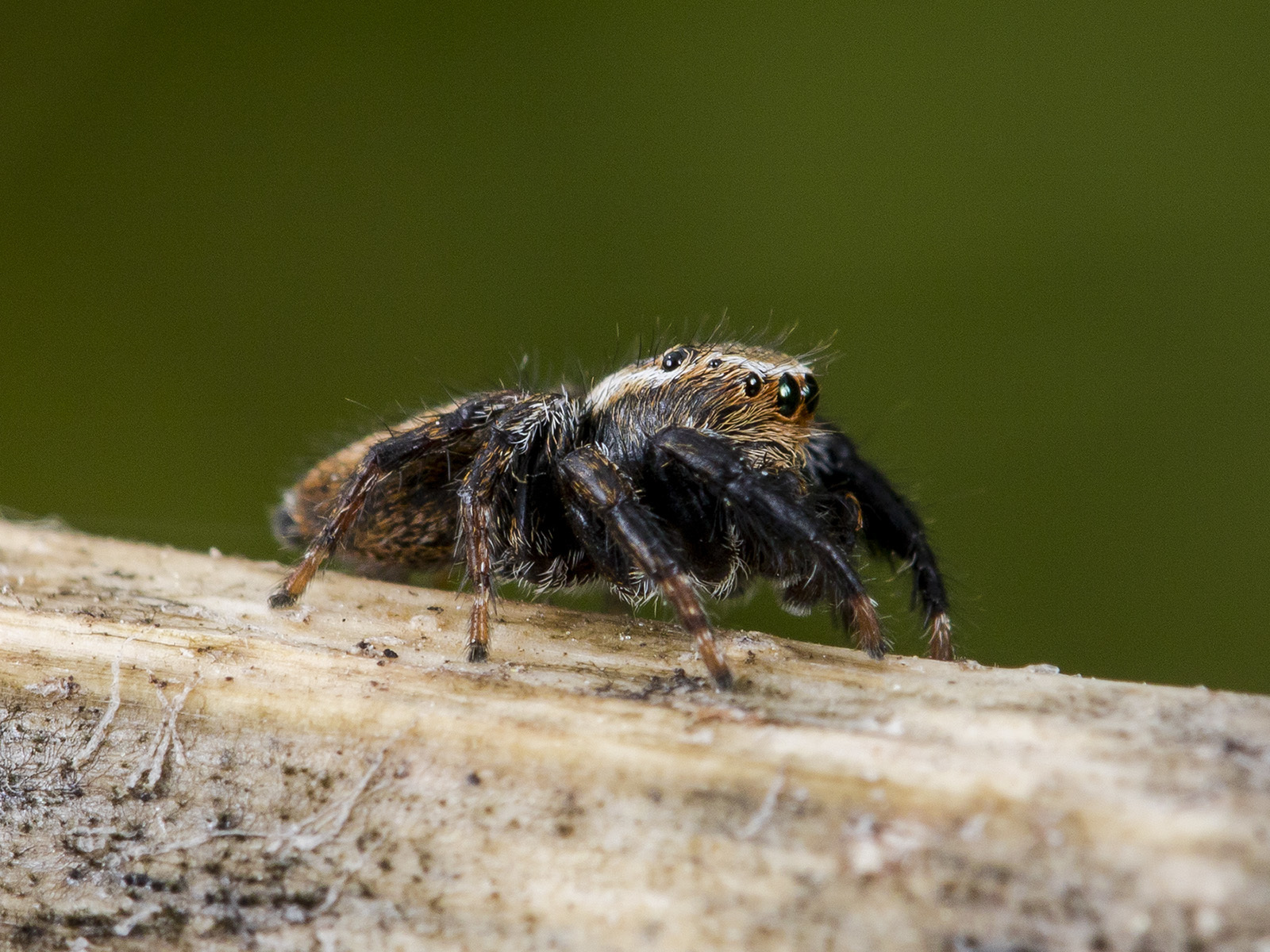
- The related Evarcha michailovi

Scientific classification
- Kingdom: Animalia
- Phylum: Arthropoda
- Subphylum: Chelicerata
- Class: Arachnida
- Order: Araneae
- Infraorder: Araneomorphae
- Family: Salticidae
- Genus: Evarcha
- Species: E. picta

Binomial name
- Evarcha picta Wesołowska & van Harten, 2007

Synonyms
- Evawes picta (Wesolowska & van Harten, 2007)

= Evarcha picta =

Species of spider

Evarcha picta is a species of jumping spider in the genus Evarcha that lives in Yemen. The species was first described in 2007 by Wanda Wesołowska and Antonius van Harten. The spider is small, with a carapace that measures between 2.4 and 2.6 mm (0.09 and 0.10 in) long and an abdomen that is between 2 and 2.4 mm (0.08 and 0.09 in) long. It has a distinctive pattern on its abdomen that is recalled in its name, which can be translated "patterned", which includes a series of white dots and chevrons. The pattern is less clear on the female than the male. Otherwise, the spider is generally brown and yellow. The male's legs are brown and yellow while the female's are yellow. There is a characteristic fovea, or indentation, in the centre of the carapace. It has distinctive copulatory organs. The female has a large depression in the centre of its epigyne and narrow insemination ducts that lead to long accessory glands and small spermathecae. The male has a terminal apophysis that makes it look as if its embolus has two branches. The spider's brownish-orange clypeus is also an identifying trait.

== Taxonomy ==
Evarcha picta is a species of jumping spider that was first described by Wanda Wesołowska and Antonius van Harten in 2007. It was one of over 500 species identified by the Polish arachnologist Wesołowska during her career, making her one of the most prolific in the field. They allocated it to the genus Evarcha, first circumscribed by Eugène Simon in 1902. The genus is one of the largest, with members found on four continents. The species has a name that is derived from the Latin word for "patterned" and refers to the pattern on its abdomen.

In 1976, Jerzy Prószyński placed the genus Evarcha in the subfamily Pelleninae, along with the genera Bianor and Pellenes. In Wayne Maddison's 2015 study of spider phylogenetic classification, the genus Evarcha was moved to the subtribe Plexippina. This is a member of the tribe Plexippini, in the subclade Simonida in the clade Saltafresia. It is closely related to the genera Hyllus and Plexippus. Analysis of protein-coding genes showed it was particularly related to Telamonia. In the following year, Prószyński added the genus to a group of genera named Evarchines, named after the genus, along with Hasarinella and Nigorella based on similarities in the spiders' copulatory organs.

Prószyński placed the spider in a new genus Evawes in 2018 based on its copulatory organs and the way that they differ from other Evarcha spiders. The new genus name is a combination of Evacha and Wesołowska. This designation is not widely accepted and the species remains in the Evarcha genus in the World Spider Catalog.

== Description ==
Evarcha picta is a small, light-coloured spider with looks that are typical for the genus. The spider's body is divided into two main parts: a round cephalothorax and an oval abdomen. The male has a carapace, the hard upper part of the cephalothorax, that is typically 2.6 mm (0.10 in) long and 2.1 mm (0.08 in) wide. It is rather high, yellow with brown sides and has a covering of brown and greyish hairs. There is a distinctive fovea, or indentation, in the centre of the carapace, that is the centre of a series of dark lines that radiate to the rearmost edge. It has a darker eye field with long bristles around the eyes themselves. There are distinctive white patches and orange hairs around the front eyes. The underside of the cephalothorax, or sternum, is yellow. The spider's face, or clypeus, is low and brownish-orange with a covering of brownish-orange hairs. Its mouthparts are distinctive. The chelicerae are light brown with two teeth to the front and one to the back. The labium and maxillae are generally yellow, although the base of the labium is slightly darker than the rest.

The male spider's abdomen is narrower than its carapace. It measures typically 2.4 mm (0.09 in) in length and having a width of between 1.7 mm (0.07 in) The top is generally yellow with a brown pattern, and covered in brown and yellow hairs that are longer to the front. It is generally lighter to the front than the back, with two white spots flanking a succession of tessellating white chevrons to the rear. The underside is yellow with a pattern of a three lines down the middle from the front to back, the middle line being thicker than the others. The spider has yellow spinnerets. Its legs are brown and yellow with brown hairs and spines. The pedipalps are brownish and hairy.

The male spider has distinctive copulatory organs. It has a rhomboid palpal bulb, with a large bulbous protrusion at its base and rounded sides. The embolus is accompanied by a spike, or terminal apophysis, that makes it look as it has two branches. They are joined by a membrane. There are small hairs on the cymbium and longer hairs on the palpal tibia. The tibia has a wide protrusion, or tibial apophysis, that also has a small tooth on its side near its end.

The female is smaller than the male, with an abdomen generally 2 mm (0.08 in) long and 1.6 mm (0.06 in) wide, and a carapace 2.4 mm (0.09 in) long and 1.9 mm (0.07 in) wide. It looks like the male but the pattern on the abdomen is less clear. It is generally more yellow and the white spots are less clear. The legs are completely yellow. The copulatory organs are again distinctive. The spider has a large wide shallow depression in the middle of its epigyne and two pockets to the rear near the epigastric furrow, a line near the very rear of the spider. The copulatory openings are mounted to the back and lead to very large many-chambered spermathecae, or receptacles, that consist of a single loop. They have heavy sclerotisation. The insemination ducts are narrow and lead to long accessory glands as well as the spermathecae.

The spider is hard to distinguish from other Evarcha spiders that are found in Africa. It is particularly similar to the related Evarcha culicivora. Externally, it most easily distinguished by its clypeus, which is brownish-orange compared to the red of the other spider. The copulatory organs are also different. The female Evarcha picta has a wider depression in the centre of the epigyne, narrower insemination ducts, longer accessory glands and smaller spermathecae, while the male has a shorter embolus. The higher level of sclerotisation on the female epigyne and the wider male tibial apophysis similar differentiate the spider from the similar Evarcha prosimilis.

== Distribution ==
Evarcha spiders live across the world, although those found in North America may be accidental migrants. Evarcha picta is endemic to Yemen. It has only been seen living in the Dhamar Governorate. The holotype was discovered in 1998 near Hammam 'Ali. Other examples were found locally.
