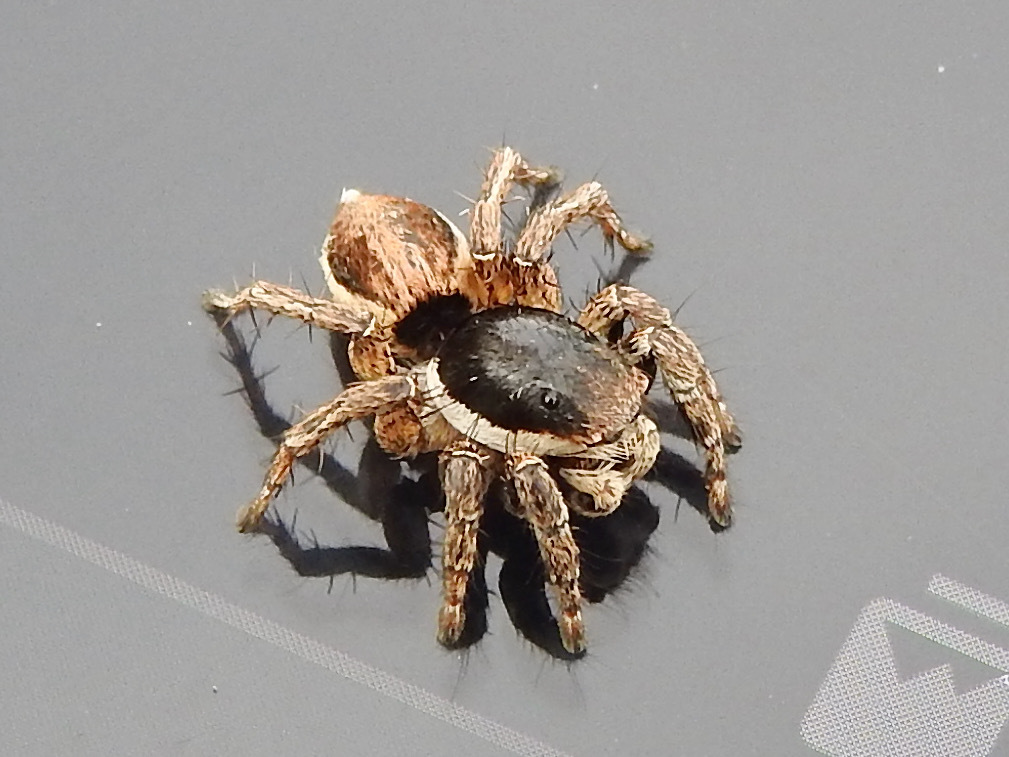
- A spider of the genus Langona

Scientific classification
- Kingdom: Animalia
- Phylum: Arthropoda
- Subphylum: Chelicerata
- Class: Arachnida
- Order: Araneae
- Infraorder: Araneomorphae
- Family: Salticidae
- Genus: Langona
- Species: L. sabulosa

Binomial name
- Langona sabulosa Wesołowska, 2011

= Langona sabulosa =

Species of spider

Langona sabulosa is a species of jumping spider in the genus Langona that lives in Namibia. It was first described in 2011 by Wanda Wesołowska. The spider is large with a cephalothorax between 2.2 and 4 mm (0.087 and 0.157 in) long and an abdomen between 2.2 and 4.5 mm (0.087 and 0.177 in). The female is noticeably larger than the male and has a very different shape to its much larger abdomen, being more heart-shaped than oval. It has the toothless chelicerae typical of the genus. The abdomen has a large leaf-like pattern, which differentiates it from other species in the genus, as can the yellowish-orange colour of the pedipalps on the male. The female has a unique epigyne that led Wesołowska to question where it should be allocated in the subtribe Aelurillina.

== Taxonomy ==
Langona sabulosa ia a jumping spider that was first described by the Polish arachnologist Wanda Wesołowska in 2011. It was one of over 500 species that she has identified. She placed it in the genus Langona, first described by Eugène Simon in 1901, on the basis of its morphological features common with other species previously described, although she expressed doubt on its exact relationship with the genus. The genus was listed in the subtribe Aelurillina in the tribe Aelurillini by Wayne Maddison in 2015. These were allocated to the clade Saltafresia. In 2017, the genus was grouped with nine other genera of jumping spiders under the name Aelurillines. It is particularly closely related to the genus Aelurillus, after which the group is named. The name of the species recalls the sandy environments where it lives.

== Description ==
The spider is large and hairy. The male has a cephalothorax that is between 2.2 and 2.9 mm (0.087 and 0.114 in) in length and 1.8 and 2.3 mm (0.071 and 0.091 in) in width. The carapace is quite high, pear-shaped and covered in short white hairs. The black eye field has long brown bristles and is marked by three round spots. The carapace is brown with the suggestion of two white streaks on its back. The abdomen is also a brown oval. It is between 2.2 and 2.6 mm (0.087 and 0.102 in) long and between 1.7 and 2.1 mm (0.067 and 0.083 in) wide. It has a large leaf-shaped marking on it and a single white uneven white stripe. The underside is an off-white colour. The chelicerae are toothless and the spinnerets dark. The legs are yellow and hairy. The pedipalps are yellowish orange and have both white hairs and brown bristles. The pedipalp tibia has a single apophysis, or appendage. The cymbium is short with long dense hairs. The palpal bulb has a triangular lobe at the rear. The embolus is spiralled up in the tip of the bulb.

The female is larger than the male, with a cephalothorax that is between 3.4 and 4 mm (0.13 and 0.16 in) long and between 2.6 and 3 mm (0.10 and 0.12 in) wide and an abdomen that is between 4.2 and 4.5 mm (0.17 and 0.18 in) in length and between 3.6 and 3.9 mm (0.14 and 0.15 in) in width. The carapace is similar to the male, although the clypeus has more obvious white hairs and the spinnerets are longer. The abdomen is much larger and has a shape reminiscent of a heart and covered in white hairs. The epigyne is large and triangular with two small gonopores visible towards the rear and a small pocket at the end of a furrow. The seminal ducts look swollen with large lumpy shapes and lead to complex internal receptacles.

In a similar way other Lagona spiders, the chelicerae are toothless. and there is a single apophysis, or appendage, on the pedipalp tibia, which enables it to be distinguished from other Aelurillinae. The species resembles the related Langona hirsuta, but may be distinguished by the pattern on the abdomen and the colour of the pedipalps. It is clearly differentiated from other Langona species by its unique epigyne. However, the design of the epigyne, along with the existence of rod hairs on the eye field and absence of a tuft on the male pedipalp led Wesolowska to query the relationship it has within the subtribe.

== Distribution and habitat ==
Langona sabulosa is endemic to Namibia. The holotype was found in 2003 in Karasburg in dunes. It was subsequently identified in Keetmanshoop and near Rehoboth. been found in Matabeleland in Zimbabwe.
