= Anthonie Blocklandt van Montfoort =

Dutch painter (1533/1534–1583)

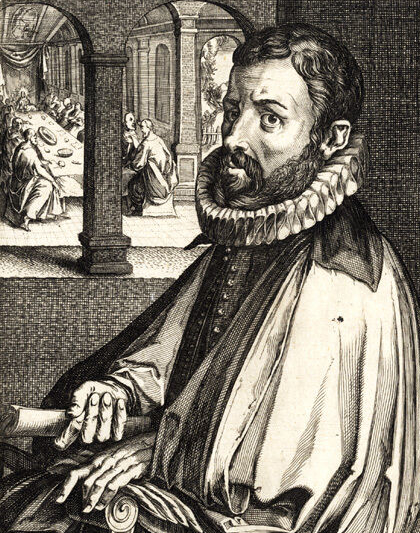
- Anthonie Blocklandt van Montfoort
- Born: 1533 or 1534; Montfoort
- Died: 18 October 1583; Utrecht
- Known for: Painting
- Movement: Mannerism

Anthonie Blocklandt van Montfoort, Anthonie van Blocklandt or Anthonie van Montfoort (1533 or 1534 - 18 October 1583) was a Dutch painter.

== Life ==
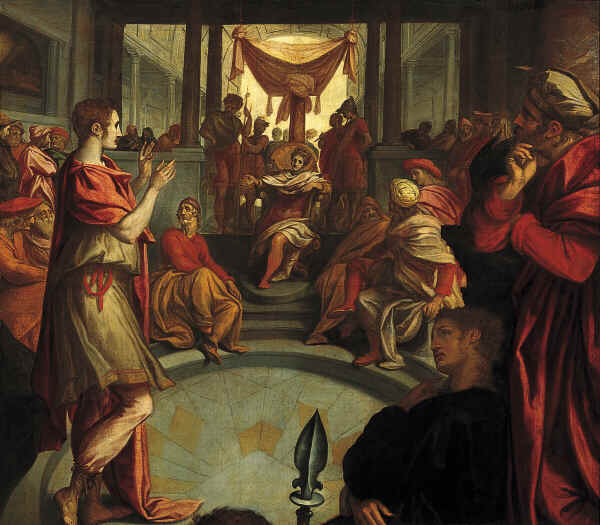
"Joseph interpreting Pharaoh's dream" by Anthonie van Montfoort (Centraal Museum)

He was born in Montfoort, where his father was at one time mayor. He went to learn under Hendrick Sweersz. in Delft and Frans Floris in Antwerp. In 1552 he returned to Montfoort, where he married the daughter of the then mayor.

Blocklandt then settled in Delft, where he produced paintings for the Oude Kerk and the Nieuwe Kerk, later lost to the beeldenstorm. Also he painted a work for the Janskerk (Gouda) called De onthoofding van Saint-Jacob, now in the museum there. He died in Utrecht.

In 1572, Blocklandt made a trip to Italy, after which he settled for good in Utrecht, joining a guild there in 1577. In 1579, he painted his best known work, the triptych The Assumption of Mary that is now in the Basilica of St. Martin in Bingen am Rhein.

According to Carel van Mander, Blocklandt painted biblical scenes, mythological subjects and portraits. He is early-Mannerist in style and he and Joos de Beer (another pupil of Floris) were responsible for the Mannerist style begun by Utrecht artists around 1590. Van Mander wrote that De Beer had many paintings by Blocklandt in his workshop that his pupil Abraham Bloemaert later copied. Few works can definitely be attributed to him. One of these is "Joseph interpreting Pharaoh's dream", now in the Centraal Museum in Utrecht.

He was also the teacher of the Delft portrait painter Michiel Jansz van Mierevelt.

== Works ==
Painting	Title	Country	Place	Museum
	Joseph interprets Pharaoh's dream	The Netherlands	Utrecht	Centraal Museum
	De opstanding van Christus	The Netherlands	Utrecht	Centraal Museum
	Aanbidding der herders	The Netherlands	Amsterdam	Rijksmuseum
	Assumption of Mary	Germany	Bingen am Rhein	Kerk
	Aphrodite disarms Eros	Czech Republic	Prague	Nationale Galerie
	Baptism of Jesus	France	Lille	Palais des Beaux-Arts de Lille
	Portrait of a Lady, three quarter length, in a ruff with matching lace cap and cuffs	United States		
