= Elandskuil Dam =

Dam on the Swartleegte River, North West, South Africa

- Interactive map of Elandskuil Dam
- Official name: Elandskuil Dam
- Country: South Africa
- Location: North West
- Coordinates: 26°29′34″S 26°46′42.2″E
- Owner: Department of Water Affairs

Dam and spillways
- Impounds: Swartleegte River

Reservoir
- Creates: Elandskuil Dam Reservoir
- Total capacity: 1 827 000 m^{3}

Elandskuil Dam is a dam located on the Swartleegte River in the North West province of South Africa, within Middle Vaal. Built in 1969, the dam was developed to primarily improve irrigation in the local area.

== See also ==
- List of reservoirs and dams in South Africa
- List of rivers of South Africa
