= Sand River Convention =

1852 treaty between the United Kingdom and Boers

Coordinates: 28°13′55″S 27°05′21″E

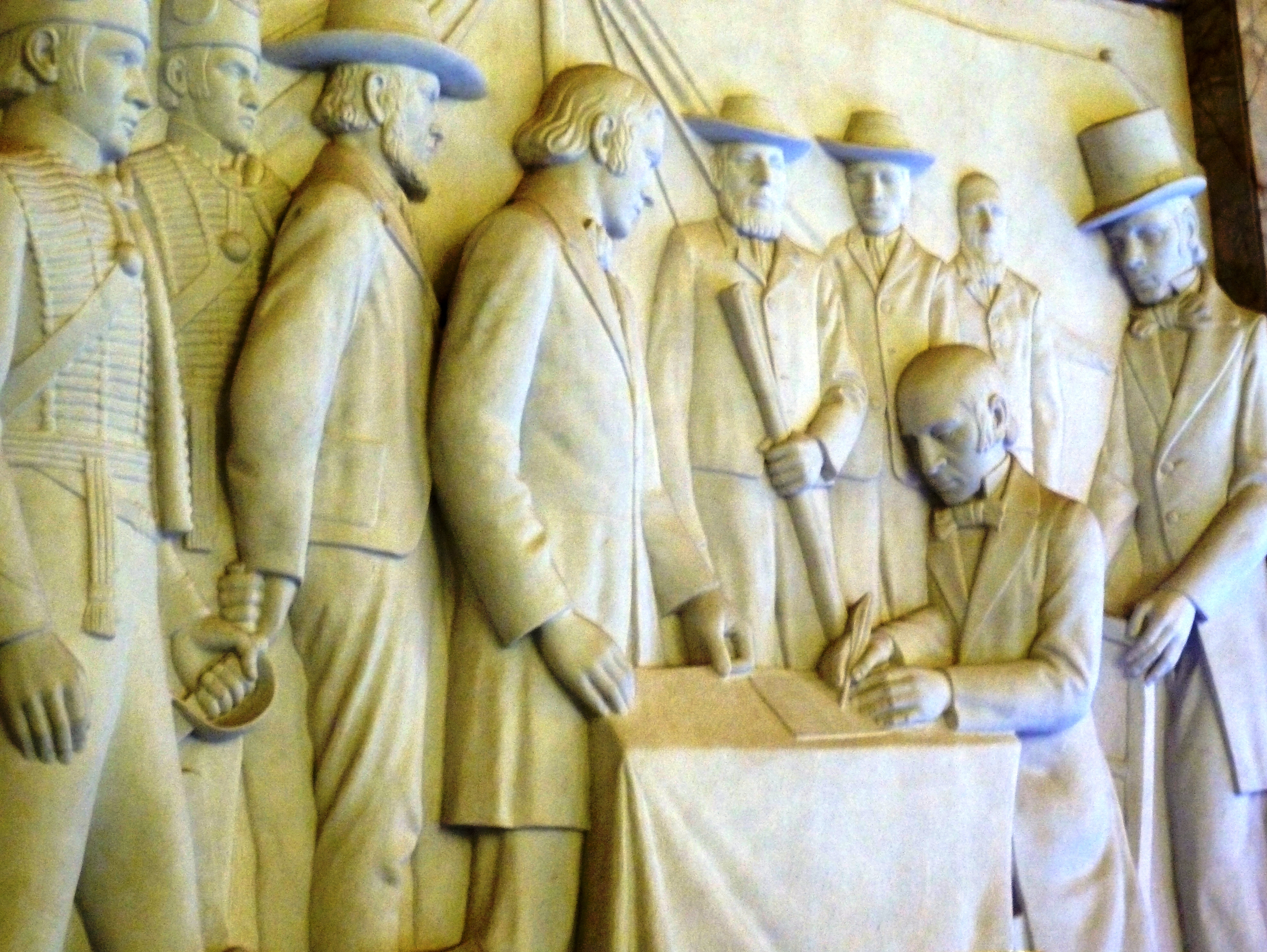
- As depicted in the Voortrekker Monument
- Type: Delimitation of territory and rights
- Signed: 17 January 1852; 174 years ago
- Location: Sand River, Orange Free State
- Signatories: Andries W. J. Pretorius; William Samuel Hogge; Charles Mostyn Owen
- Language: English

Full text
- Sand River Convention at Wikisource

The Sand River Convention (Afrikaans: Sandrivierkonvensie) of 17 January 1852 was a convention whereby the United Kingdom of Great Britain and Ireland formally recognised the independence of the Boers north of the Vaal River.

== Background ==
The convention was signed on 17 January 1852, by Commandant-General Andries Pretorius and others, on behalf of the new country, and Major William Samuel Hogge and Charles Mostyn Owen, clerk to the Civil Commissioner of Winburg, duly authorised to, and on behalf of, the British government. The treaty was signed on the farm called Sand River belonging to P. A. Venter, near Ventersburg.

== Provisions ==
The treaty contained the following provisions:

1. The British government guarantees and grants the emigrant farmers across the Vaal river the right to govern themselves, according to their own laws free from any and all British interference and that the British Government wishes to promote peace, free trade and friendly intercourse with the new country
2. Britain disclaims any and all alliances with coloured nations to the North of the Vaal river
3. No slavery be practised in the country to the North of the Vaal river
4. Ammunition and arms crossing over the border from the South of the Vaal river shall require a certificate from a British Magistrate, and that no arms or munitions be supplied to the natives by either the British or by the people of the new country
5. Criminals will be exchanged between the British and the new country and that summonses for witnesses from both sides of the river be backed up by the magistrates at both sides of the river
6. It is agreed that certificates of marriages will be recognised on both sides of the river
7. It is agreed that any and all people now residing in British land but being in possession of land in the new country shall have the free right to sell the property and to move freely over the Vaal river.

== Claims of contraventions ==
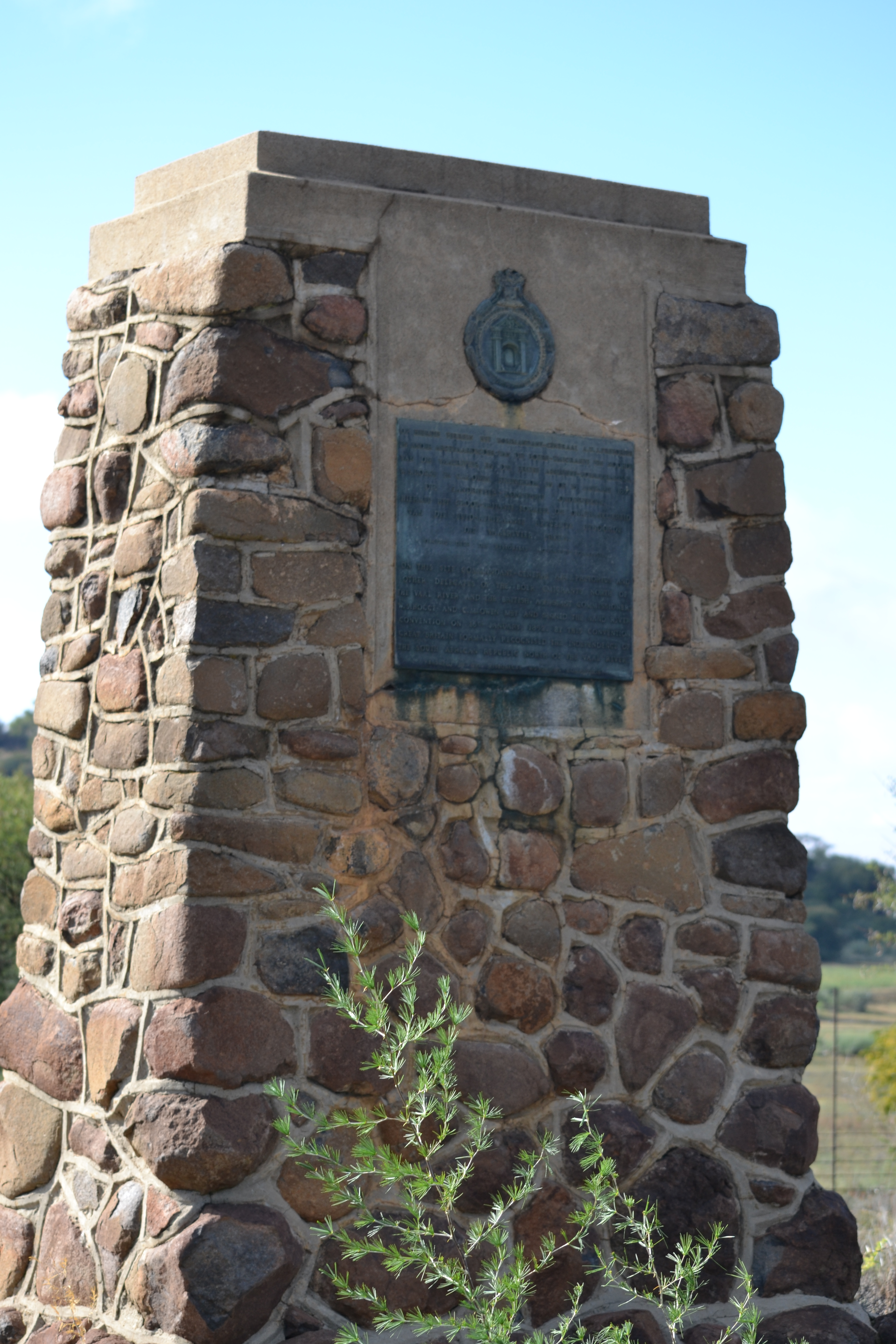
Memorial at the site

South African Republic authorities claimed the British contravened the treaty in 1853, with a British citizen, the missionary David Livingstone, supplying, storing, and making repairs to materials of war for the native tribes. Commandant Scholtz and his men confiscated a large number of rifles and amounts of ammunition and equipment from Livingstone's home. The British in turn claimed that the Boers were keeping slaves under the Inboekstelsel system. The Boers responded that the acts of a few criminals and criminal gangs cannot be claimed to be that of an entire nation.

=== First Boer War ===
One of the causes of the First Boer War was the direct breach by the British of this convention on 12 April 1877. Britain issued a proclamation called: "Annexation of the S.A. Republic to the British Empire," and proceeded to occupy Pretoria. Although the British did not attempt to dismantle the country, and self-rule was decreed in the proclamation, the annexation was not accepted by the South African Republic, and a delegation was sent to Europe and the United States to protest this action.
