= María Eugenia de Beer =

Spanish chalcographer (died 1652)

María Eugenia de Beer (died 1652), was a Spanish chalcographer.

She was the granddaughter of the painter Joos de Beer and daughter of Cornelius de Beer (1586, Utrecht – 1651, Madrid), a Dutch-born painter and engraver who moved to Spain in 1618. In 1641 she married Nicolas Merstraten. She was known for her production of engraved illustrations. Many of her motifs were religious or mythological. She signed her works with the name "Doña".

- Carrete Parrondo, Juan, «Divertimento y trascendencia: estampas de María Eugenia de Beer, 1640 – 1652», en Cuaderno de aves para el príncipe, Barcelona, Gustavo Gili, 1982.
