= DeBeer Lacrosse =

DeBeer Lacrosse is one of the oldest sports equipment manufacturers in the United States. It is retailer of equipment for lacrosse, and sponsors programs such as Virginia Cavaliers men's lacrosse at the University of Virginia and the 2009 championship USA women's lacrosse team.

== History ==
Originally J. deBeer and Son, Inc, it was founded by Jacob deBeer in 1889 making baseballs in Johnstown, New York. In 1934 they created the patented "clincher" softball, which was invented by Frederick S. deBeer, who was the founder's son, and who eventually was inducted in the Chicago 16" Softball Hall of Fame . Fritz deBeer, Jr., Dick Pollak, Jim Muhlfelder, and Bob Campbell later joined the business and expanded to sports manufacturing. In the 1980s the baseball division was bought by Worth Inc. and Muhlfelder transformed deBeer into a lacrosse company. Using previous baseball experience, they created the first CU31, making lacrosse shafts lighter as well as stronger with the use of metal baseball bat technology.

In 2000, DeBeer began a line of women's lacrosse equipment. Their first stick, The Apex, was the first women's lacrosse head to legally have a pocket in their stick, which significantly changed the women's game.
