= Vet River =

Vet
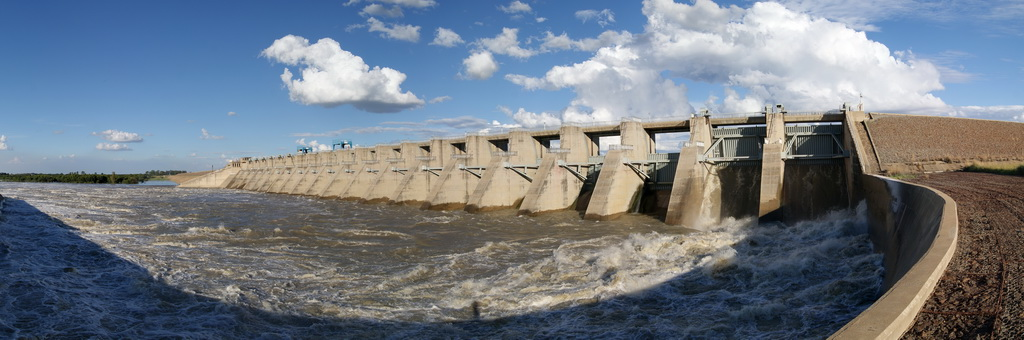
- The Bloemhof Dam, at the confluence of the Vet with the Vaal River

- Location of the Vet River mouth
- Etymology: Translated into Afrikaans from its Khoekhoe name Geigoub, meaning 'great fat'.
- Native name: Geigoub (Khoekhoe)

Location
- Country: South Africa
- Region: Free State

Physical characteristics
- Source
  - location: Between Marquard and Clocolan
  - elevation: 1,269 m (4,163 ft)
- Mouth: Vaal River
  - location: Bloemhof Dam
  - coordinates: 27°41′S 25°40′E
  - elevation: 1,241 m (4,072 ft)

Basin features
- Tributaries
  - right: Sand River

The Vet River (Afrikaans: Vetrivier, "fat river") is a westward-flowing tributary of the Vaal River in central South Africa. Its sources are between Marquard and Clocolan and the Vet River flows roughly northwestwards to meet the Vaal at the Bloemhof Dam near Hoopstad.

Erfenis Dam was built on this river in order to provide water for the town of Theunissen.

== Tributaries ==
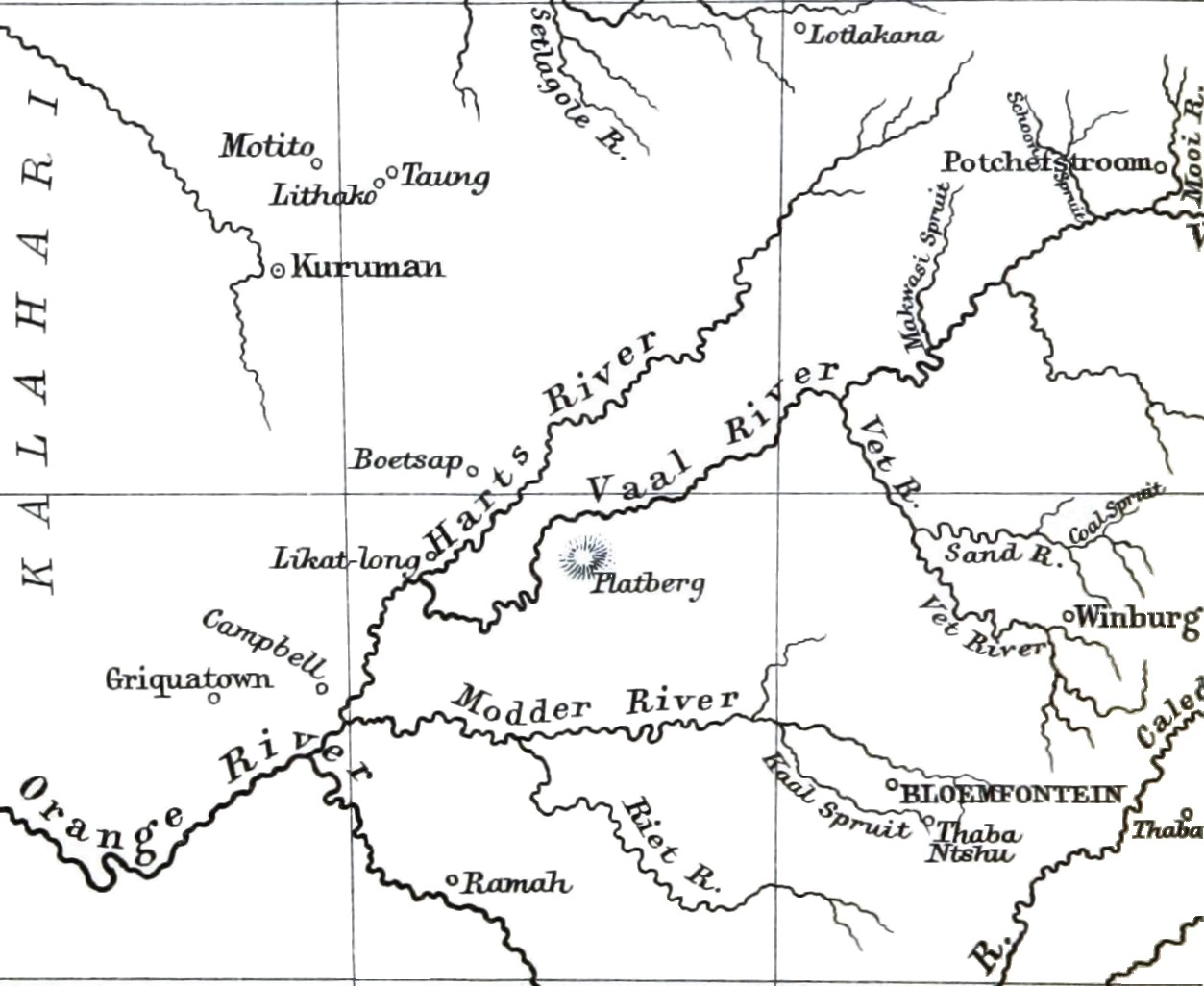
Vet River (middle right) on a map of 1887

Its main tributary is the Sand River which joins it from the east.

The actual Vet river is formed at the confluence of the Klein Vet and the Groot Vet upstream from the Erfenis Dam.

== See also ==
- List of rivers in South Africa
- Middle Vaal Water Management Area
