= Sand River (Free State) =

Sand River Sandrivier
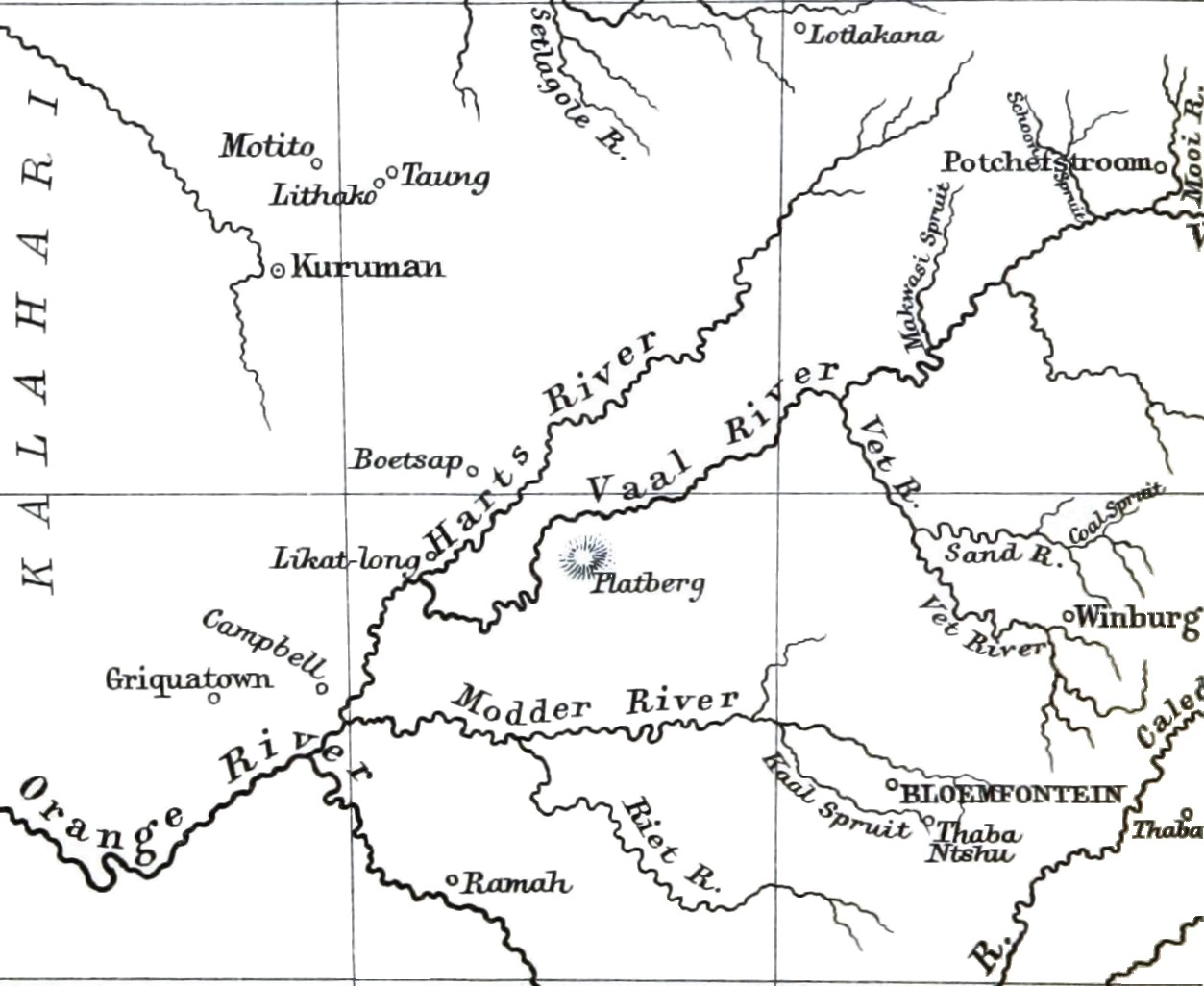
- Sand River (middle right) on a map of 1887

- Location of the Sand River mouth
- Etymology: Named after an incident in which a wagon got stuck into the sand of its dry riverbed

Location
- Country: South Africa
- State: Free State

Physical characteristics
- Source: By Tweefontein
  - location: NW of Ficksburg
  - elevation: 1,660 m (5,450 ft)
- Mouth: Vet River
  - location: Near Tierfontein
  - coordinates: 28°5′33″S 26°24′51″E
  - elevation: 1,260 m (4,130 ft)
- Length: 200 km (120 mi)

The Sand River (Afrikaans: Sandrivier, formerly Zandrivier) is a river in the Free State province, South Africa. It is located close to the towns of Welkom and Virginia in the gold mining centre of the Free State. Its source is located close to Tweefontein NW of Ficksburg not far from the South Africa-Lesotho border (at 28°40′49″S 27°41′23″E). This river is famous because of the historical Sand River Convention signed nearby, an important event in South African political history.

== Catchment and tributaries ==
The Sand River is a tributary of the Vet, in turn a tributary of the Vaal. Its tributaries include the Debeerspruit, among others. It is considered part of the Middle Vaal Catchment Management Area. It is only dammed by the Allemanskraal Dam in the Willem Pretorius Game Reserve.

== History ==
The Sand River Convention that led to the independence of the Transvaal Republic was signed in a marquee on the banks of the Sand River on 17 January 1852. A monument commemorating the ceremony can today be found on the banks of the river some 15 kilometres (9.3 mi) from Winburg.

On 25 March 25, 1900, during the guerrilla phase of the Anglo-Boer War, a Council-of-War led by the Boers that wanted to continue with the hostilities was held at a bridge over the Sand River.

On May 10, 1900, the British fought a Boer defensive position at the Sand River during the Second Boer War.

In 1988 the Sand River burst its banks and flooded parts of Virginia town. In 1994 the Merriespruit tailings dam disaster occurred just outside Virginia, killing seventeen people.

The river was named after an incident where a wagon got bogged down in its sand, and had to be unloaded before the journey could continue.

== See also ==
- Sand River Convention
- Second Boer War
- List of rivers of South Africa
- List of reservoirs and dams in South Africa
