= S.A. Lombard Nature Reserve =

Nature reserve in South Africa

Coordinates: 27°36′20.46″S 25°27′52.49″E

- Interactive map of S.A. Lombard Nature Reserve
- Location: Near Bloemhof, North West, South Africa
- Area: 46 km^{2} (18 sq mi)
- Elevation: 1,200 m (3,900 ft)
- Established: 1954
- Governing body: Nature Conservation Branch

S.A. Lombard Nature Reserve is around 20 km west of Bloemhof, North West, South Africa, and lies around 1,200 m above sea level. The area receives around 380–500 mm of rain every year, mostly between November and April. In the summer, the temperature reaches as high as 27 °C, and in the winter, it reaches as low as 10 °C. In June and July, temperatures sometimes fall below freezing. The reserve is around 46 km² and is fairly flat and almost treeless. The area is divided into a western and an eastern half. On the border between them is an area where diamonds were mined around 1920. Farmed by mules during World War II, the area was taken over by the Nature Conservation Branch. In 1954, the region became a reserve. The reserve played a major role in preserving the population of black wildebeest and is not open to the public.

== Plants ==
The area consists of grassland with local shrubs, known as Cymbopogon-Themeda veld. The eastern half is rooted in mainly brakturf (brackish soil), while the western contains mainly sandy loam. The brakturf often floods and its layers often sprout the grass species Sporobolus ludwigii and S. ioclados usitatus, along with Lycium hirsutum. The higher areas feature Cymbopogon-Themeda grasses and ganna, small shrubs similar to those found in the Karoo. The western Cymbopogon-Themeda veld boasts species such as Themeda triandra, Cymbopogon plurinodis, Eragrostis lehmanniana, Eregrostis atherstonii, Enneapogon scoparius, Rhus lancea, Ziziphus mucronata, Diospyros licioides, and Grewia flava. The water plant Marsilea macrocarpa and the grass species Diplachne fusca can be found in the northern section of the reserve.

== Fauna ==
Many types of grazing animals can be found in the reserve, including black wildebeest, blesbok, common eland, impala, and springbok.
