= Rietspruit Dam =

- Interactive map of Rietspruit Dam
- Country: South Africa
- Location: Ventersdorp, North West
- Coordinates: 26°24′35″S 26°48′38″E
- Purpose: Irrigation
- Opening date: 1977
- Owner: Department of Water Affairs

Dam and spillways
- Type of dam: Earth fill dam

Rietspruit Dam is a dam near Ventersdorp in North West province, South Africa. It was established in 1977.

== See also ==
- List of reservoirs and dams in South Africa
