= Kgaswane Mountain Reserve =

Ramsar site reserve within the Magaliesberg Biosphere, North West, South Africa

- Rustenburg Nature Reserve
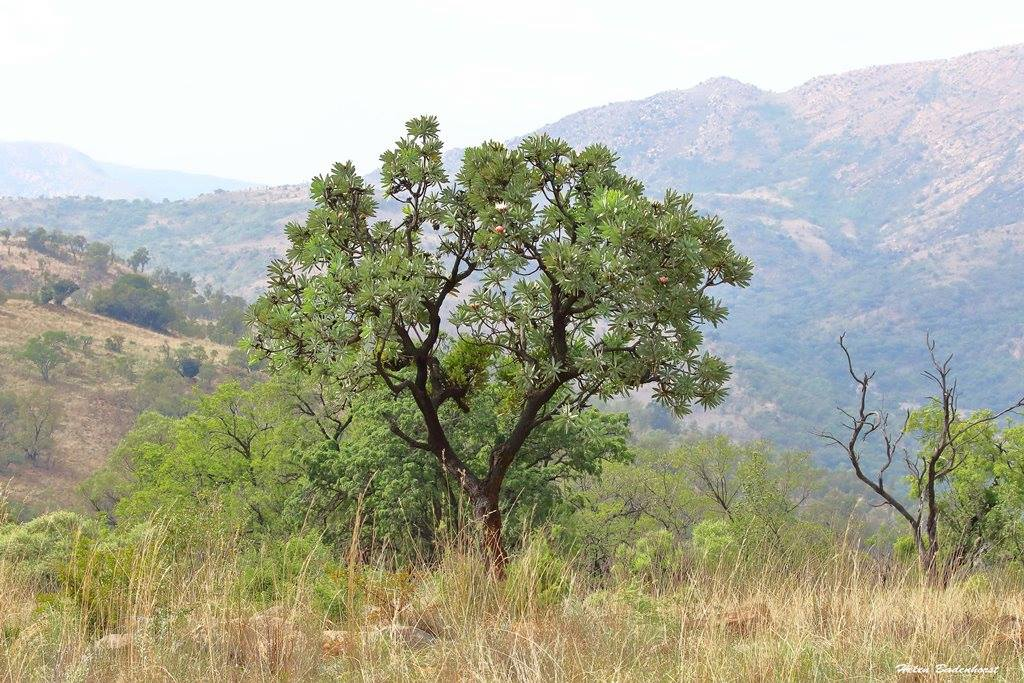
- Interactive map of Kgaswane Mountain Reserve
- Type: Nature reserve
- Location: Boekenhout Road, Rustenburg, North West Province, South Africa
- Nearest city: Rustenburg
- Coordinates: 25°42.9′S 27°11.64′E
- Area: {53 km^{2} (20 sq mi)
- Created: Rustenburg Nature Reserve - 15 February 1967; 59 years ago; Kgaswane Mountain Reserve - 21 February 2017; 9 years ago
- Operator: North West Parks and Tourism Board
- Open: All year
- Camp sites: 22
- Hiking trails: 4
- Species: Large game 320 birds species
- Website: www.tourismnorthwest.co.za/kgaswane-mountain-reserve/

Ramsar Wetland
- Official name: Kgaswane Mountain Reserve
- Designated: 29 March 2019
- Reference no.: 2385

Kgaswane Mountain Reserve is a nature reserve of 53 square kilometres (20 sq mi) consisting of veld and mountains run by the North West Parks and Tourism Board. It is located 5 km (3.1 mi) south-west of Rustenburg on the northern slopes of the Magaliesberg, inside of the Magaliesberg Biosphere Reserve and alongside the western portion of the Magaliesberg Protected Natural Environment. Kgaswane is home to many species of flora and bird life and large and small mammals, and has been designated as a protected Ramsar site since 2019. The reserve has a number of camp sites, hikes and trails.

== History ==
The reserve was originally established on the farm Rietvallei which once belonged to President Paul Kruger and has expanded over many to cover 53 km^{2} (20 sq mi) with the park proclaimed in 1967.

== Fauna and flora ==
=== Mammals ===
The reserve has over 800 antelope and some other species includes klipspringer, the grey duiker, bushbuck, kudu, oribi, mountain reedbuck, impala, red hartebeest, zebra, springbok, steenbok, sable antelope and the waterbuck. The reserve also has a few predators like the caracal, aardwolf, jackal and leopard.

=== Birds ===
320 species of birdlife has recorded in the reserve and includes a breeding colony of Cape vultures as well as martial and Verreaux's eagles. Other interesting species include Red-winged Francolin, the African black swift and the Sentinel rock thrush.

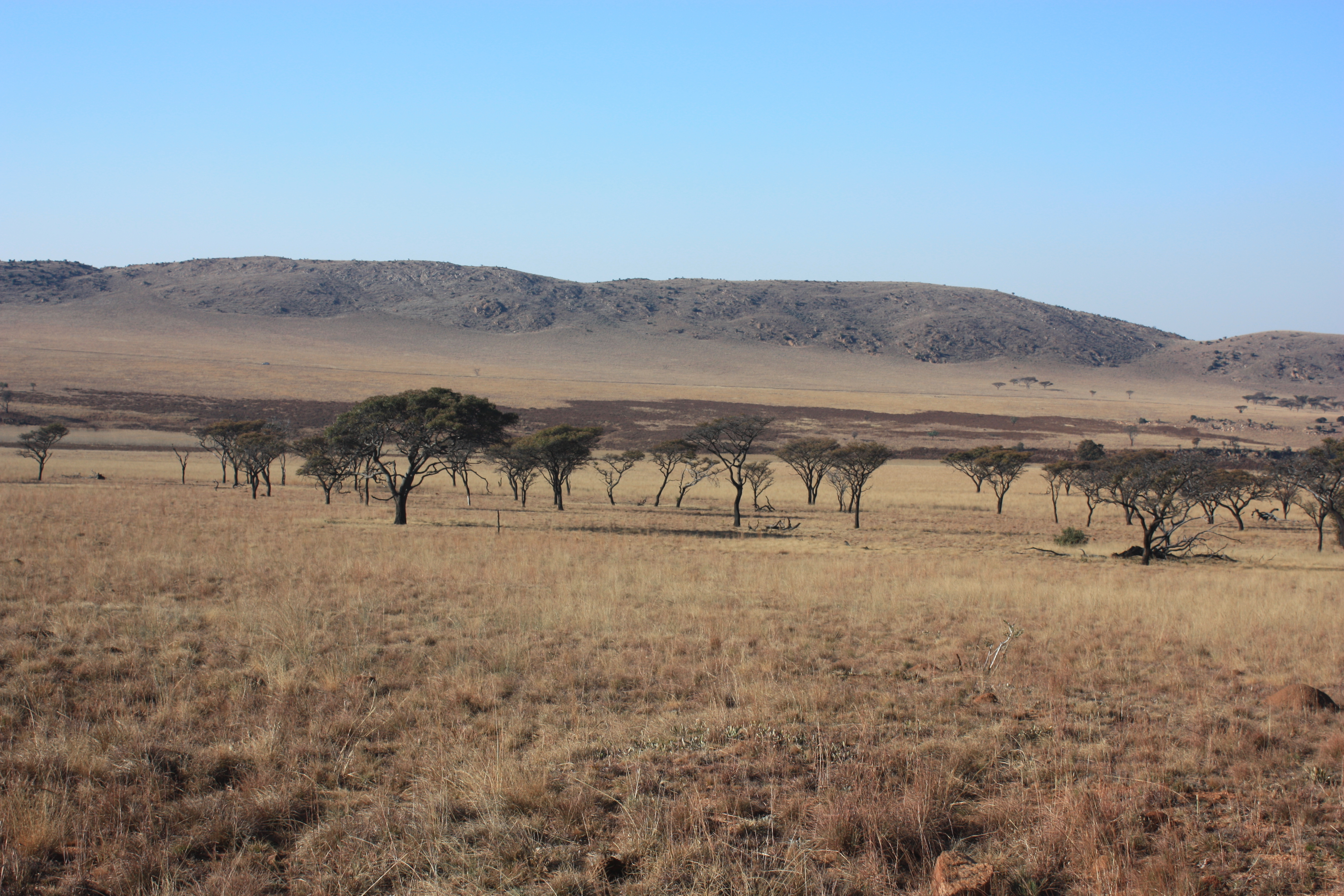

=== Vegetation ===
The reserve consists grassland, scrub, mixed woodland, and pockets of fynbos. 115 tree and bush species are said to grow in the reserve and includes some rare plants.

== Recreation ==
The reserve caters for day visitors who wish to visit the park to picnic or braai by following the tarred roads to those sites. For overnight stays, the reserve also has a cottage, a group camp and 22 camping sites. The group camp can accommodate up to fifty people in huts with a communal kitchen and dining area, ablution block and an outdoor boma. The cottage can accommodate fourteen people. The reserve also has a visitors centre.

The reserve has four hiking trails. The Vlei Trail is a short 2 km (1.2 mi) track ideal for viewing birds. The Peglarae Trail is approximately 5.5 km (3.4 mi) with terrain being steep and rocky. The last two are overnight hiking trails with the Summit Route of 25.3 km (15.7 mi) and includes natural pools for swimming and the Baviaanskrans Route is 19.5 km (12.1 mi) and has a waterfall view and a Garden of Remembrance and amenities in two huts to accommodate twelve hikers on both trails.
