= Dylan de Beer =

Zimbabwean cricketer (born 1982)

Personal information
- Born: 20 February 1982 (age 44); Port Elizabeth, Cape Province, South Africa
- Batting: Right-handed
- Bowling: Right-arm off break
- Role: Wicket-keeper, opening batsman

Domestic team information
- Years: Team
- 2002/03–2003/04: Manicaland

Career statistics
Competition	FC	LA
Matches	3	5
Runs scored	137	89
Batting average	22.83	22.25
100s/50s	0/1	0/1
Top score	74	58
Catches/stumpings	6/0	0/0
- Source: ESPNcricinfo, 12 July 2021

Dylan de Beer (born 20 February 1982) is a former Zimbabwean cricketer. He was born in Port Elizabeth, Cape Province, South Africa. A wicket-keeper and opening batsman, he played three first-class matches for Manicaland during the 2002–03 Logan Cup.
