= Sandveld Nature Reserve =

Nature reserve in South Africa

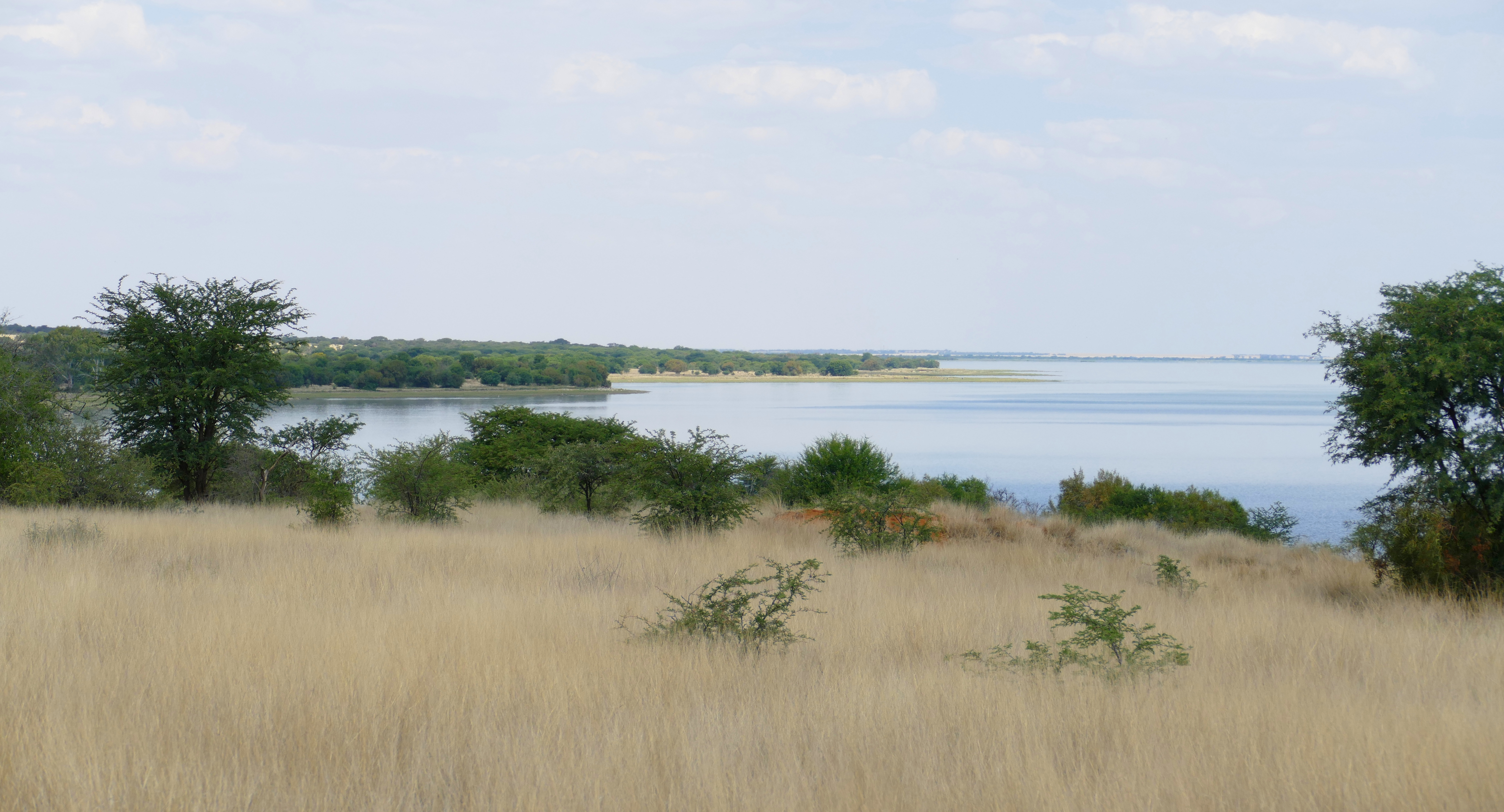
- View of the reserve and Bloemhof Dam
- Location in the Free State
- Nearest city: Bloemhof
- Coordinates: 27°44′S 25°38′E
- Area: 37,000 ha (91,000 acres)
- Sandveld Nature Reserve (Free State (South African province))

Sandveld Nature Reserve is a protected area, located on the border between the Free State and North West provinces in South Africa.

== Location ==
It is located on the Free State side of the Bloemhof Dam. The Bloemhof Dam lies where the Vaal River and the Vet River meet on the border between the Free State and North West provinces.

The complete area around the dam has been proclaimed a nature reserve. Since it is on the border between two provinces, two separate reserves were established. On the Free State side is the Sandveld Nature Reserve, while the protected area on the North West side is called Bloemhof Dam Nature Reserve.

== Flora and fauna ==
The Sandveld Nature Reserve is about 37,000 hectares (91,000 acres) in size. It is named after its sandy sandveld area, although part of its surface consists of thornveld savanna with camelthorn trees.

Among the large mammals present in the reserve are the white rhino, giraffe, sable antelope, roan antelope, African buffalo, blue wildebeest, and zebra.
