= Walter Wolff de Beer =

Dutch philatelist

Walter Sylvain Wolff de Beer (28 March 1892 – 20 December 1982) was a Dutch philatelist who was added to the Roll of Distinguished Philatelists in 1954.
