= Joos de Beer =

Dutch painter (died 1591)

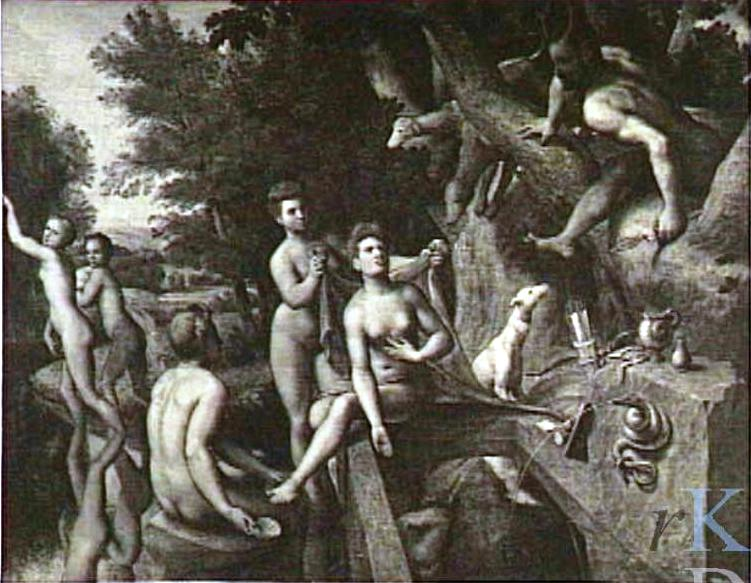
Diana and Acteon, 1579.

Joos de Beer (died 1591) was an Early Dutch painter from Utrecht.

== Biography ==
According to Karel van Mander, he was a pupil in Antwerp of Frans Floris, who later returned to his native Utrecht and became the teacher of Abraham Bloemaert and Joachim Wtewael.

Together with Anthonie Blocklandt van Montfoort (whom he knew as a fellow pupil of Frans Floris), he is known as the founder of the Utrecht school of painting that started around 1590. Van Mander states that De Beer had many paintings by Blocklandt in his workshop that young Bloemaert copied.
