= Erfenis Dam =

- Location within South Africa
- Official name: Erfenis Dam
- Country: South Africa
- Location: Theunissen, Free State
- Coordinates: 28°30′39″S 26°46′38″E
- Purpose: Irrigation
- Opening date: 1960
- Owner: Department of Water Affairs

Dam and spillways
- Type of dam: Earth fill dam
- Impounds: Groot-Vet, Klein-Vet, Soutspruit
- Height: 34 m (112 ft)
- Length: 489 m (1,604 ft)

Reservoir
- Creates: Erfenis Dam Reservoir
- Total capacity: 212 340 000 m³
- Catchment area: 4,724 km^{2} (1,824 sq mi)
- Surface area: 32.91 km^{2} (12.71 sq mi)

The Erfenis Dam is an earth-fill type dam located in the Free State province of South Africa, on the Vet River, near Theunissen. It was established in 1960 and its primary purpose is for irrigation use. The hazard potential of the dam has been ranked high (3).

== See also ==
- List of reservoirs and dams in South Africa
- List of rivers of South Africa
