= Tugela Vaal Transfer Scheme =

South African irrigation project

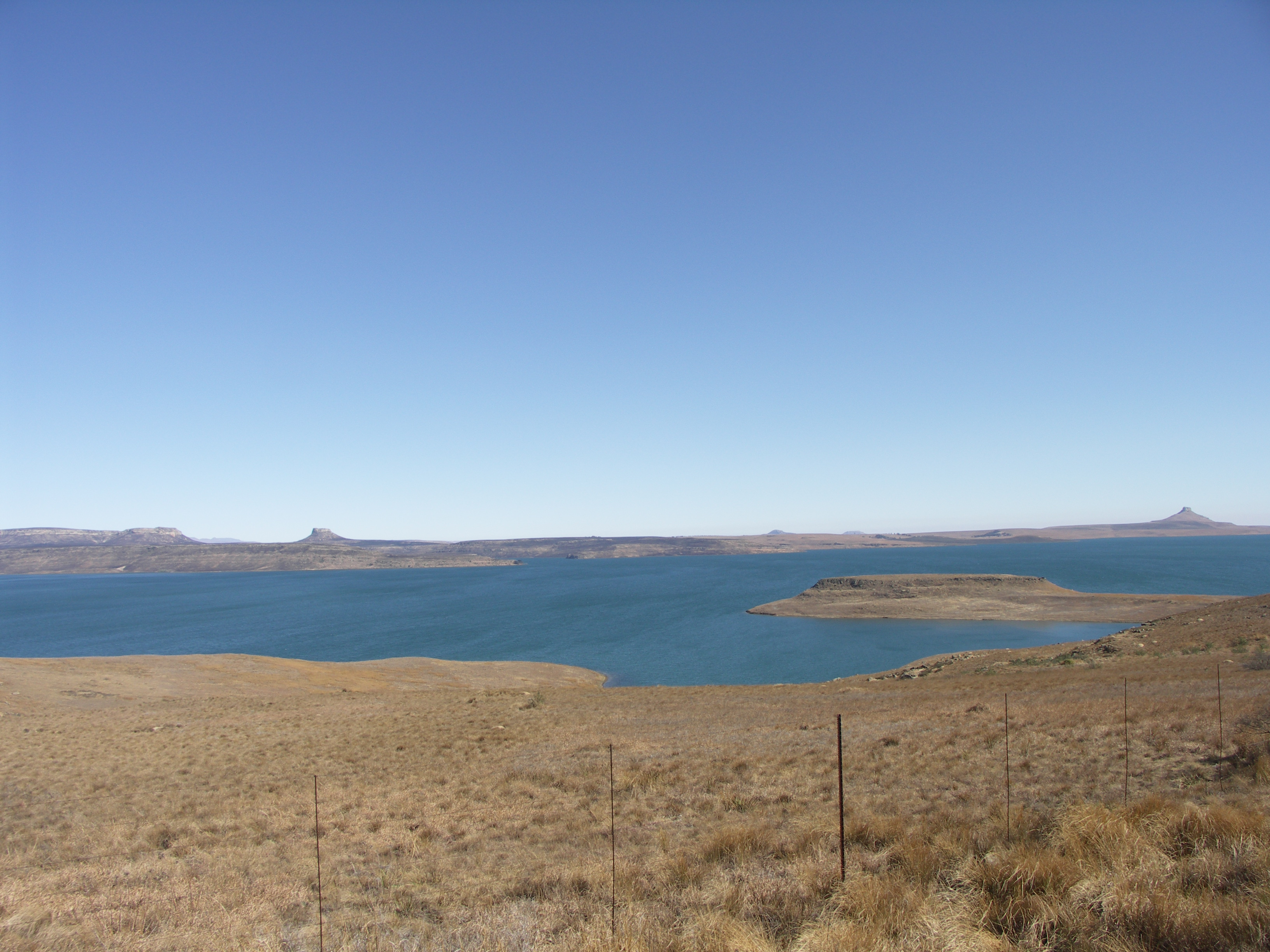
Sterkfontein dam lake.

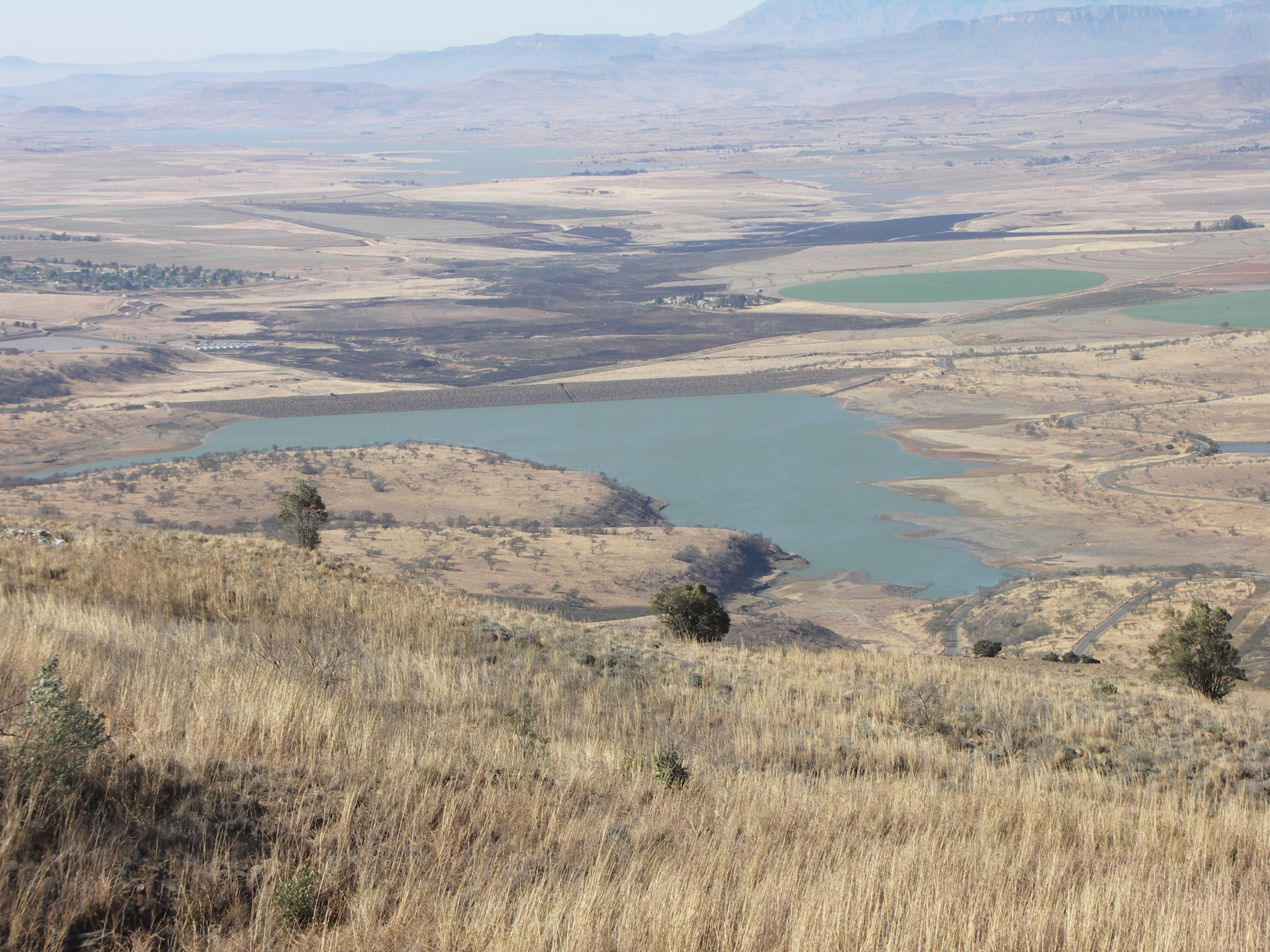
Kilburn Dam Lake in KwaZulu-Natal, about 500 meters below the Sterkfontein Dam lake level. View from the Oliviershoek Pass.

The Tugela Vaal water Transfer Scheme is an irrigation project developed in the Drakensberg mountains at the Oliviershoek Pass in South Africa.

The project will thus allow the annual transfer from the Tugela basin (in KwaZulu-Natal) of 630 million m3 of water to the Vaal basin (in the Free State) in the north, and ultimately the Vaal dam in Gauteng.

Various pumping stations and water reservoirs have been or are to be created or adapted as part of the implementation of this project.

The main dams built are:

- the Woodstock Dam in KwaZulu-Natal;
- the Kilburn Dam in KwaZulu-Natal;
- the Driekloof Dam in the Free State;
- the Sterkfontein Dam in the Free State.

Currently, the Drakensberg Pumped Storage Scheme of the electricity producer Eskom allows, since 1981, essentially energy storage, and its exploitation by pumped storage. The current system already includes the Spioenkop Dam. Other dams to be built, around the towns of Ladysmith (Jana dam) and Escourt (Mielietuin dam), will collect water which will be transported by pipeline to the Kilburn dam lake, at the foot of the Drakensberg, to be then sent to the Vaal Basin by pumping.

== History ==
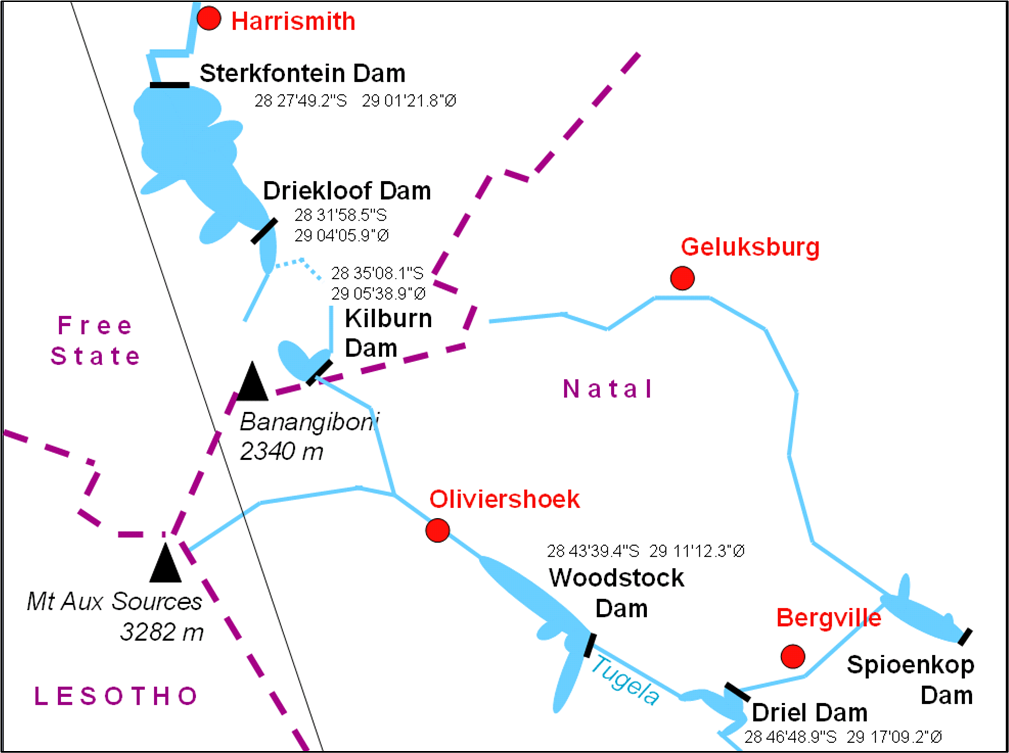
The current Drakensberg Pumped Storage Scheme

The first phase of the project, which began in 1970, was commissioned on 8 November 1974.

From 1994, the Department of Water Affairs and Forestry of the Government of South Africa studied the means of increasing the volume of water available in the Vaal basin for agricultural use in particular. A feasibility study using water supply from the Tugela basin in the vicinity of Bergville was launched in December 1996.

The works are currently being built gradually, and the project was to be fully completed during the 2010s. The transfer of water from the Tugela River to the Sterkfontein Dam was expected to begin in August 2019, but was delayed to December due to technical and safety issues.

== See also ==
- Lesotho Highlands Water Project, another Vaal water supply project, from Lesotho.
