= Harrismith Airport =

- IATA: HRS; ICAO: FAHR

Summary
- Airport type: Private
- Location: Harrismith, Maluti-a-Phofung Local Municipality, Free State, South Africa
- Elevation AMSL: 5,585 ft / 1,702 m
- Coordinates: 28°14′06″S 029°06′23″E

Map
- Location of Harrismith Airport in South Africa

Runways
Direction	Length		Surface
Direction	ft	m	Surface
15/33	3,560	1,085	Asphalt

Harrismith Airport (IATA: HRS, ICAO: FAHR) is a small airfield near 42nd Hill in Free State, South Africa. It is located in Harrismith, halfway between Johannesburg and Durban. No commercial flights operating in or out of Harrismith and caters only for general aviation. It is along the N3 road and near the N5 road.

== Nearby places ==
- Sterkfontein Dam
- Swinburne, Free State

== See also ==
- Thabo Mofutsanyana District Municipality
