= Wilge River =

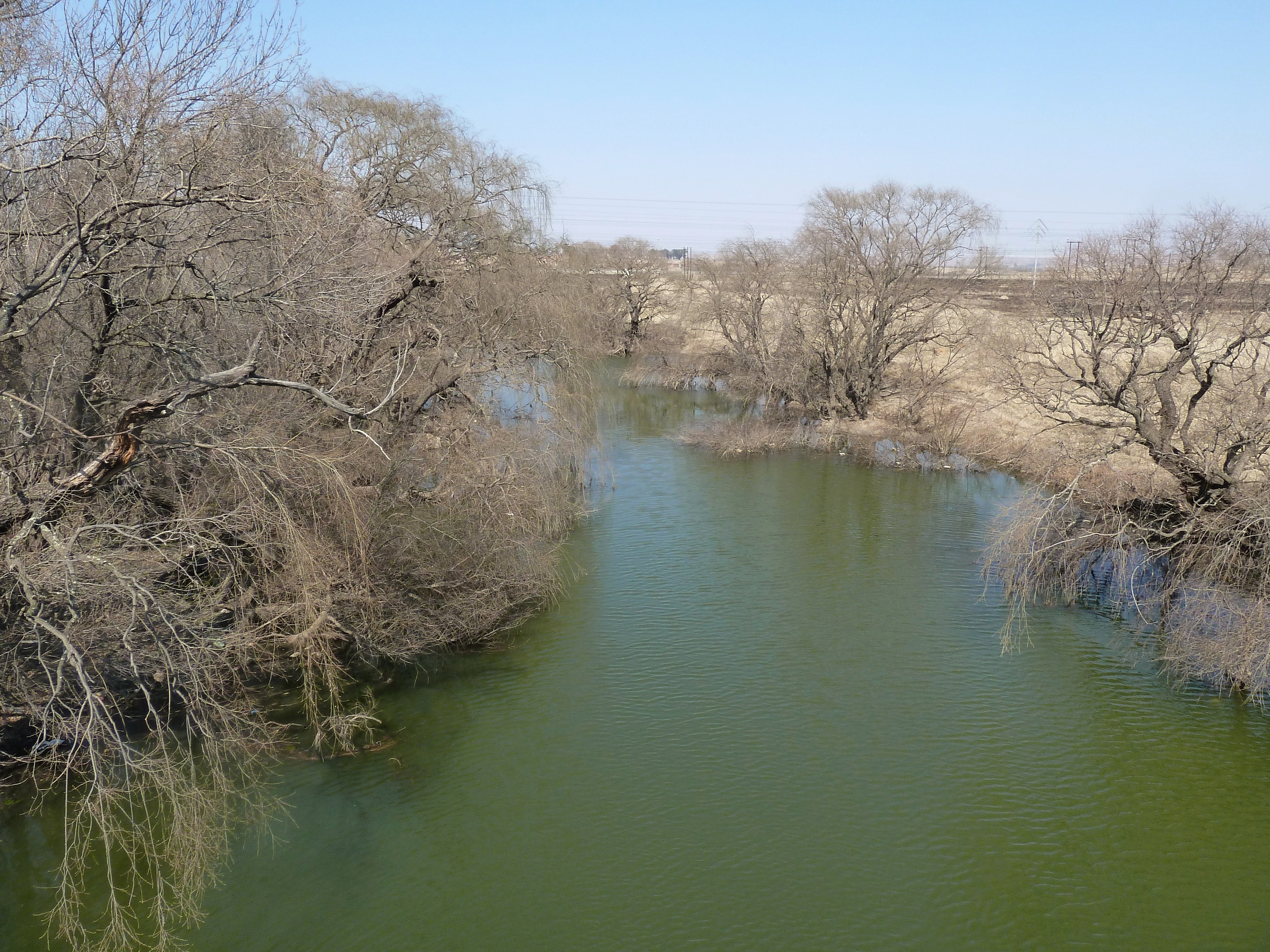
- The river near Harrismith

- Location of the Wilge River mouth
- Etymology: From wilg, the word for 'willow' in Afrikaans

Location
- Country: South Africa
- Region: Free State

Physical characteristics
- Source
  - location: Drakensberg
  - elevation: 2,040 m (6,690 ft)
- Mouth: Vaal River
  - location: Vaal Dam
  - coordinates: 27°8′30″S 28°23′6″E
  - elevation: 1,499 m (4,918 ft)

Basin features
- Tributaries
  - left: Nuwejaarspruit, Elands River (Wilge)|Elands River, Liebenbergsvlei
  - right: Meul River, Cornelis River

The Wilge River (Afrikaans: Wilgerivier, meaning "willow river") is a tributary of the Vaal River in central South Africa. This river is important as part of the Tugela-Vaal Water Transfer Scheme where water is transferred from the Tugela River basin to the Vaal River basin.

The largemouth yellowfish is present in the waters of the Wilge River, reaching quite a large size.

== Course ==
Its sources are about 50 km northeast of Harrismith, at the border with KwaZulu-Natal. In its upper course the river flows roughly southwestwards from its source, then westwards while bending northwards towards Harrismith, skirting the southern end of the Platberg where there is the confluence with the Nuwejaarspruit from the left.

Further north the Elands River joins its left bank. Then the Meul River and the Cornelis River join its right bank. It continues flowing in a NNW direction, being joined by the Liebenbergsvlei River from the left, while passing near Frankfort and flowing northwestwards until it finally meets the Vaal at the Vaal Dam further downstream.

== Dams in its basin ==
- Sterkfontein Dam and the Driekloof Dam, in the Nuwejaarspruit - The Sterkfontein is the third largest dam in South Africa. Practically all the water it contains is pumped up the escarpment from KwaZulu-Natal. Built before the Lesotho Highlands Water Project was developed, this was a vital source of water for Gauteng.
- Fika-Patso Dam, in the Namahadi River (Elands)

== Gallery ==
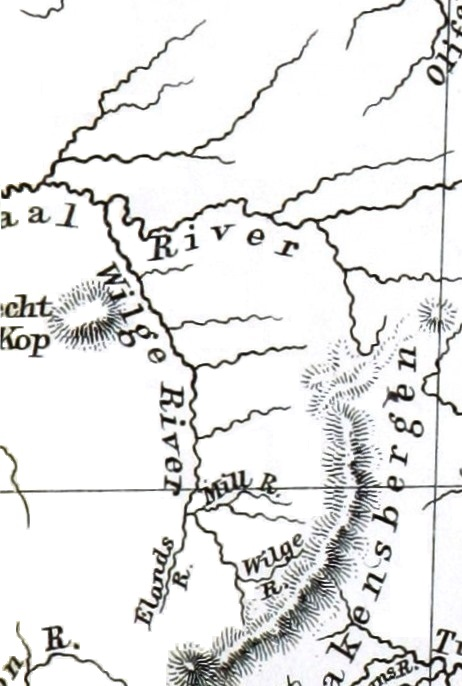
The Wilge River and its tributaries on a map of 1887

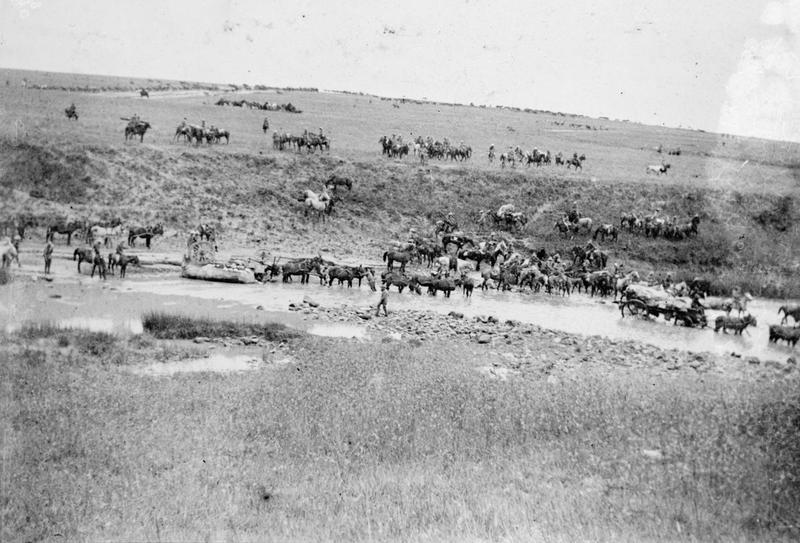
A horse train fording the river during the Second Boer War

== See also ==
- Drakensberg Pumped Storage Scheme
- List of rivers in South Africa
