= Driekloof Dam =

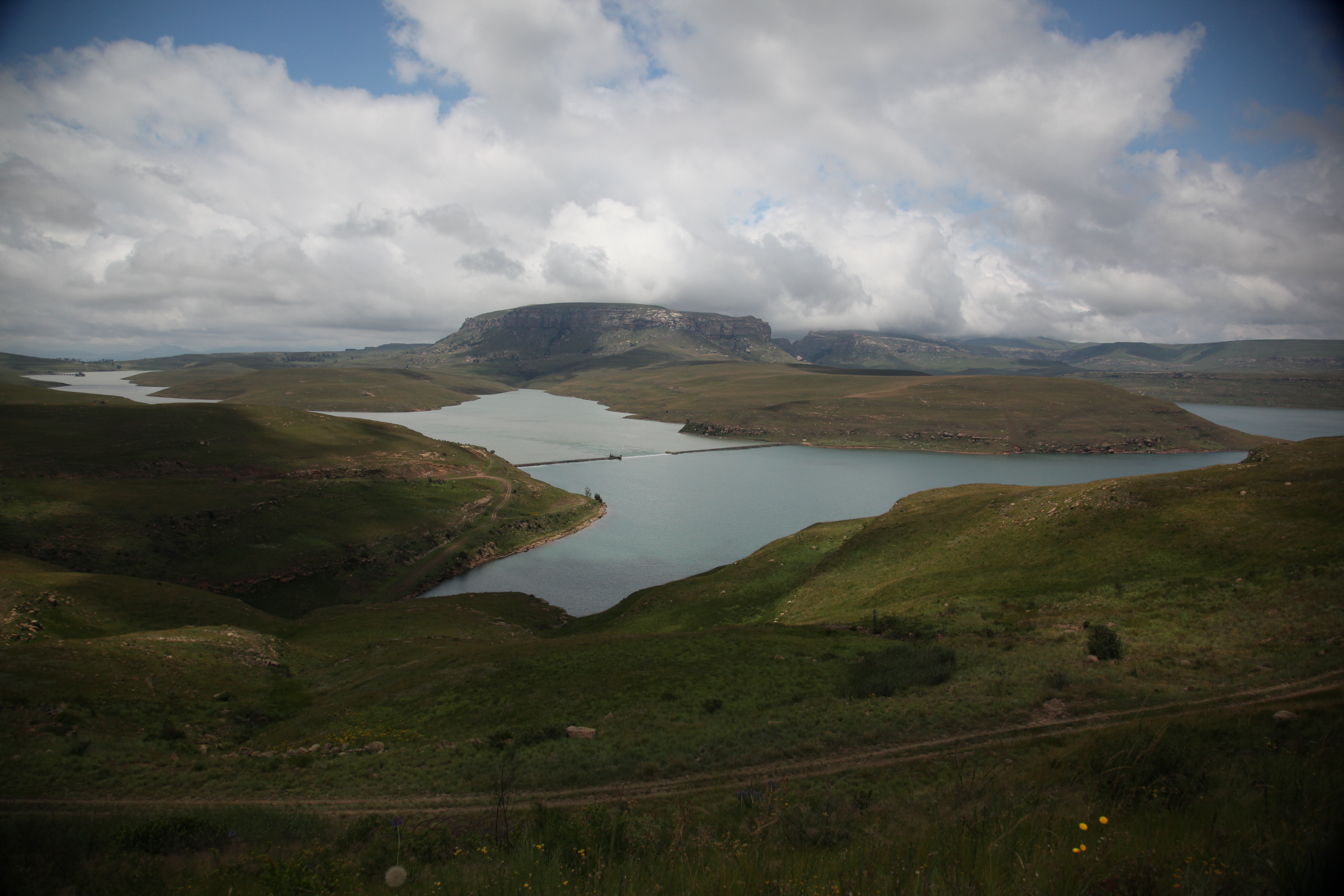
- Weir separating Sterkfontein and Driekloof Dams with Driekloof in the background.

- Location within South Africa
- Official name: Driekloof Dam
- Location: Free State, South Africa
- Coordinates: 28.5165°S 29.0634°E
- Opening date: 1979
- Operators: Department of Water Affairs and Forestry / Eskom

Dam and spillways
- Impounds: Nuwejaar Spruit
- Height: 47 m (154 ft)
- Length: 500 m (1,600 ft)

Reservoir
- Creates: Driekloof Dam
- Total capacity: 35.6 million cubic metres (28,900 acre⋅ft)
- Catchment area: 191 ha (470 acres)

Driekloof Dam is a small section of the Sterkfontein Dam, Free State, South Africa. A section of the Sterkfontein Dam reservoir is isolated after the construction of Driekloof Dam, this small reservoir has a capacity of 35.6 million cubic metres (28,900 acre⋅ft)., together with the Kilburn Dam almost 500 metres (1,600 ft) lower, Driekloof forms part of Eskom's Drakensberg Pumped Storage Scheme and Tugela-Vaal Water Project, and provides for up to 27.6 gigawatt-hours (99 TJ) of electricity storage in the form of 275 million cubic metres (9.7×10^{9} cu ft) of water. The water is pumped to Driekloof during times of low national power consumption (generally over weekends) and released back into Kilburn through four 250 megawatts (340,000 hp) turbine generators in times of high electricity demand.

The scheme is operated in such a way that there is a net pumping of up to 631 million cubic metres (512,000 acre⋅ft)/annum depending upon the water availability in the Tugela catchment (Woodstock Dam) as well as the need for augmentation in the Vaal Dam catchment.

The Driekloof Dam was commissioned in 1979, has a capacity of 32,071 cubic metres (26.000 acre⋅ft), and a surface area of 1.906 square kilometres (0.736 sq mi), the Dam wall is 47 metres (154 ft) high.
