= Zelotes mashonus =

Mashonaland Dark Ground Spider

Conservation status
- Least Concern (SANBI Red List)

Scientific classification
- Kingdom: Animalia
- Phylum: Arthropoda
- Subphylum: Chelicerata
- Class: Arachnida
- Order: Araneae
- Infraorder: Araneomorphae
- Family: Gnaphosidae
- Genus: Zelotes
- Species: Z. mashonus

Binomial name
- Zelotes mashonus FitzPatrick, 2007

Species of spider

Zelotes mashonus is a species of spider in the family Gnaphosidae. It is found in Africa and is commonly known as the Mashonaland dark ground spider.

== Distribution ==
Zelotes mashonus occurs in four African countries: Democratic Republic of the Congo, Botswana, Zimbabwe, and South Africa. In South Africa, it is recorded only from KwaZulu-Natal and Mpumalanga. The species occurs at an altitude of 2,998 m above sea level.

Collection localities include Mont-Aux-Sources and Embuleni Nature Reserve.

== Habitat and ecology ==
Zelotes mashonus are free-running ground spiders found under stones during the day in the Savanna biome.

== Conservation ==
Zelotes mashonus is listed as Least Concern by the South African National Biodiversity Institute due to its wide geographic range in Africa. There are no significant threats to the species, and it is protected in the Embuleni Nature Reserve.

== Taxonomy ==
The species was described by FitzPatrick in 2007 from Zimbabwe. The species is known only from the female.
