= Drakensberg Pumped Storage Scheme =

Dam in Free State & KwaZulu-Natal, South Africa

- Diagram of the dams involved in the Drakensberg Pumped Storage Scheme and Tugela-Vaal Water Project
- Country: South Africa
- Location: Free State & KwaZulu-Natal
- Coordinates: 28°34′23″S 29°5′13″E
- Status: Operational
- Construction began: 1974
- Opening date: 1981
- Owner(s): Eskom

Upper reservoir
- Creates: Drieklloof Dam
- Total capacity: 32,071,000 m^{3} (26,000 acre⋅ft)

Lower reservoir
- Creates: Kilburn Dam
- Total capacity: 35,577,000 m^{3} (28,843 acre⋅ft)

Power Station
- Hydraulic head: 460 m (1,510 ft)
- Installed capacity: 1,000 megawatts

The Drakensberg Pumped Storage Scheme is an energy storage facility built in the South African provinces of Free State and KwaZulu-Natal starting in 1974 and completed by 1981.

Four dams are involved in the scheme; the Driekloof Dam (joined to the Sterkfontein Dam), the Kilburn Dam, the Woodstock Dam and the Driel Barrage. Electricity generation equipment is located between Driekloof Dam and Kilburn Dam. Since the Driekloof Dam/Sterkfontein Dam also forms part of the Tugela-Vaal Water Project some of the water pumped to Driekloof Dam might end up flowing to the Vaal Dam and not be available for return to the Kilburn Dam. The Woodstock Dam and Driel Barrage are used to supply this additional water to Kilburn Dam when required.

The scheme provides for up to 27.6 gigawatt-hours (99 TJ) of electricity storage in the form of 27,000,000 cubic metres (950,000,000 cu ft) of water. The water is pumped to Driekloof during times of low national power consumption (generally over weekends) and released back into Kilburn through four 250 megawatts (340,000 hp) turbine generators in times of high electricity demand.

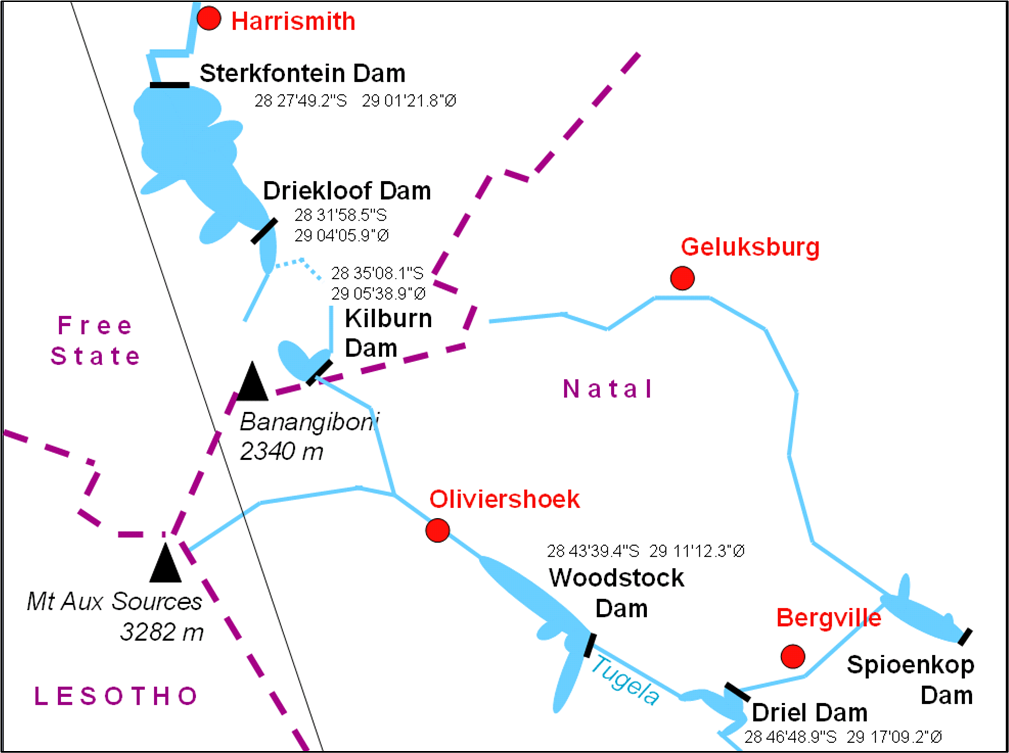
Map of dams in the scheme

== See also ==
- Pumped-storage hydroelectricity
- List of power stations in South Africa
- List of energy storage projects
