= Harrismith =

Town in Free State, South Africa

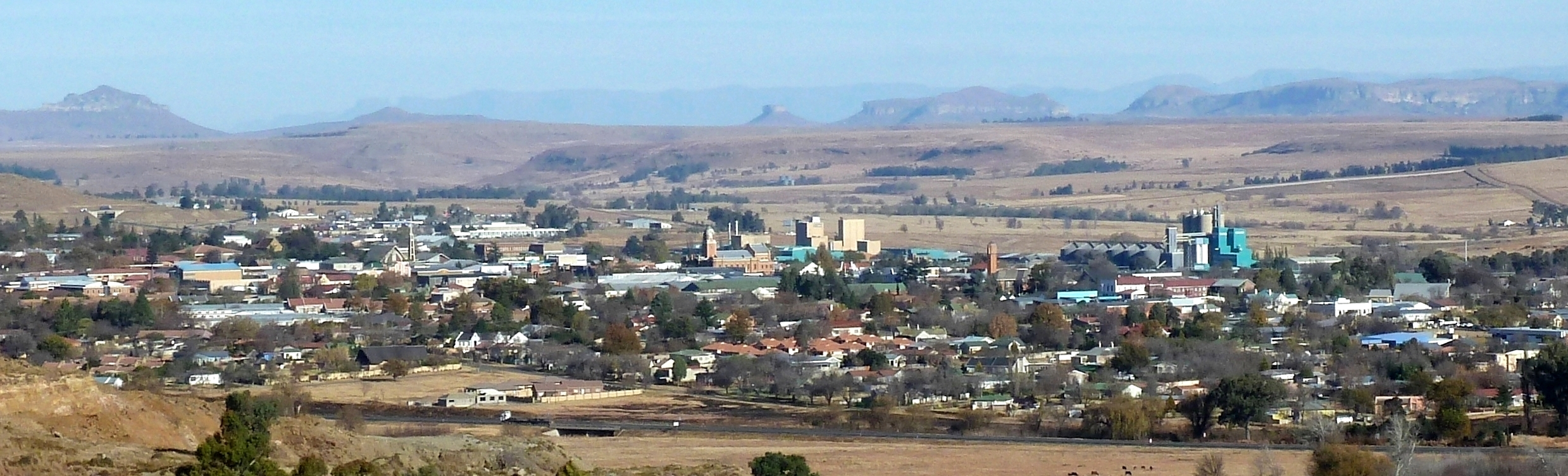
- View from the north

- Location within Free State (South African province) Location within South Africa
- Coordinates: 28°17′0″S 29°08′0″E
- Country: South Africa
- Province: Free State
- District: Thabo Mofutsanyana
- Municipality: Maluti-a-Phofung
- Established: 1849

Area
  - Total: 138.80 km^{2} (53.59 sq mi)

Population (2021)
  - Total: 52,765
  - Density: 380.15/km^{2} (984.59/sq mi)

Racial makeup (2011)
  - Black African: 87.1%
  - Coloured: 0.8%
  - Indian/Asian: 1.3%
  - White: 10.7%
  - Other: 0.2%

First languages (2011)
  - Zulu: 49.4%
  - Sotho: 32.6%
  - Afrikaans: 10.4%
  - English: 3.7%
  - Other: 3.8%
- Time zone: UTC+2 (SAST)
- Postal code (street): 9880
- PO box: 9880
- Area code: 058
- Website: Harrismith - Community Website

Harrismith is a large town in the Free State province of South Africa. It was named for Sir Harry Smith, a 19th-century British governor and high commissioner of the Cape Colony. It is situated by the Wilge River, alongside the N3 highway, about midway between Johannesburg, about 275 km to the north-west, and Durban to the south-east. The town is located at the junction of the N5 highway, which continues westward towards the provincial capital Bloemfontein, some 340 km to the south-west. This important crossroads in South Africa's land trade routes is surrounded by mesas and buttes. It is located at the base of one of these called Platberg (i.e. "flat / flat-topped mountain" in Afrikaans).

The municipality was placed under administration in 2018 after then-mayor Vusi Tshabalala was removed from office on the basis of corruption allegations. Being situated halfway between Johannesburg and Durban, the town is generally very busy, especially the N3 freeway that runs past the town.

== History ==
The town was founded in 1849 and named after British Governor Sir Harry Smith. who tried to persuade the Voortrekkers not to abandon the Cape Colony.

The town was initially laid out by Robert Moffat about 25 km from the present location, in present-day Aberfeldy on the Elands River. That site however proved to be deficient in water and Harrismith was shifted to its present site in January 1850. Twenty-four years later it became a municipality and during the diamond rush at Kimberley, Northern Cape, the town became a busy staging post on the Natal transport route. As a direct result of this, hotels, stores and public buildings sprang up.

By the 1880s the town was seen as the second largest in the Orange Free State. The increased infrastructure and traffic in the region made fording of the Wilge river impractical. After heavy rains the swollen river prevented communication, interrupted transport and claimed lives. The government was petitioned and two bridges were opened in 1884, one six miles towards Bethlehem, and another at the current Swinburne. The use of these were taxed until 1905.

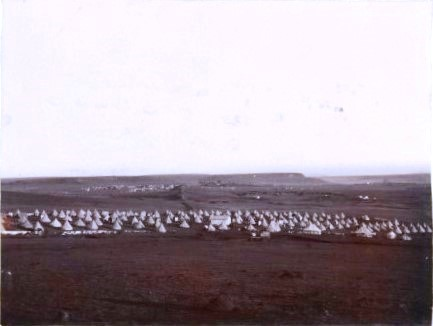
The British concentration camp of Harrismith during the Second Boer War

Harrismith was a major base during the South African (Anglo-Boer) War and visitors can see the several blockhouses, engineering works and a military cemetery that are evidence of this. The town's main street, Warden Street, is named after Major Henry D. Warden, at that time a British resident in Bloemfontein.

The town is around 90 km east from Bethlehem and 45 km north-east of nearby Phuthaditjhaba. The small nearby hamlet of Swinburne (originally) is named after Sir John Swinburne, a gold prospector. The townships associated with Harrismith are Intabazwe located in the north and Tshiame in the west.

== Present day ==
Harrismith is well known as an overnight or refreshment stop along the N3 route, and a convenient refuelling stop for trucks and vehicles, but it has much more to offer. Beyond the highway is a previously tidy town with many elegant late 19th century buildings made of hewn sandstone. There are numerous bed & breakfast places catering to visitors. It is the best access point to the northernmost Drakensberg, including Tugela Falls and Mont-Aux-Sources (accessed via the Sentinel Hiking Trail, in the QwaQwa region of the Free State, 80 km south-west of Harrismith on the R57), Sterkfontein Dam Nature Reserve (20 km southeast of town on the R74), Royal Natal Park and the uKhahlamba / Drakensberg Park World Heritage Site (66 km southeast via Oliviershoek Pass beyond Sterkfontein Dam) and the spectacular Golden Gate Highlands National Park 50 km south-west of town on the R712.

Harrismith is the centre of one of the five wool producing districts in Southern Africa.

The town is home to the largest truck stop in the Southern Hemisphere, named Highway Junction.

Harrismith is also home to the small Harrismith Airport.

Two other places in the world bear the same name: Harrismith Beach and Harrismith House near Bottom Bay in Barbados and Harrismith in the Wheatbelt region of Western Australia.

== Tourist attractions ==
Harrismith Town Hall

Altenative View of Harrismith Town Hall

- Harrismith Town Hall – A sandstone and brick building built in 1907, and a National Monument.

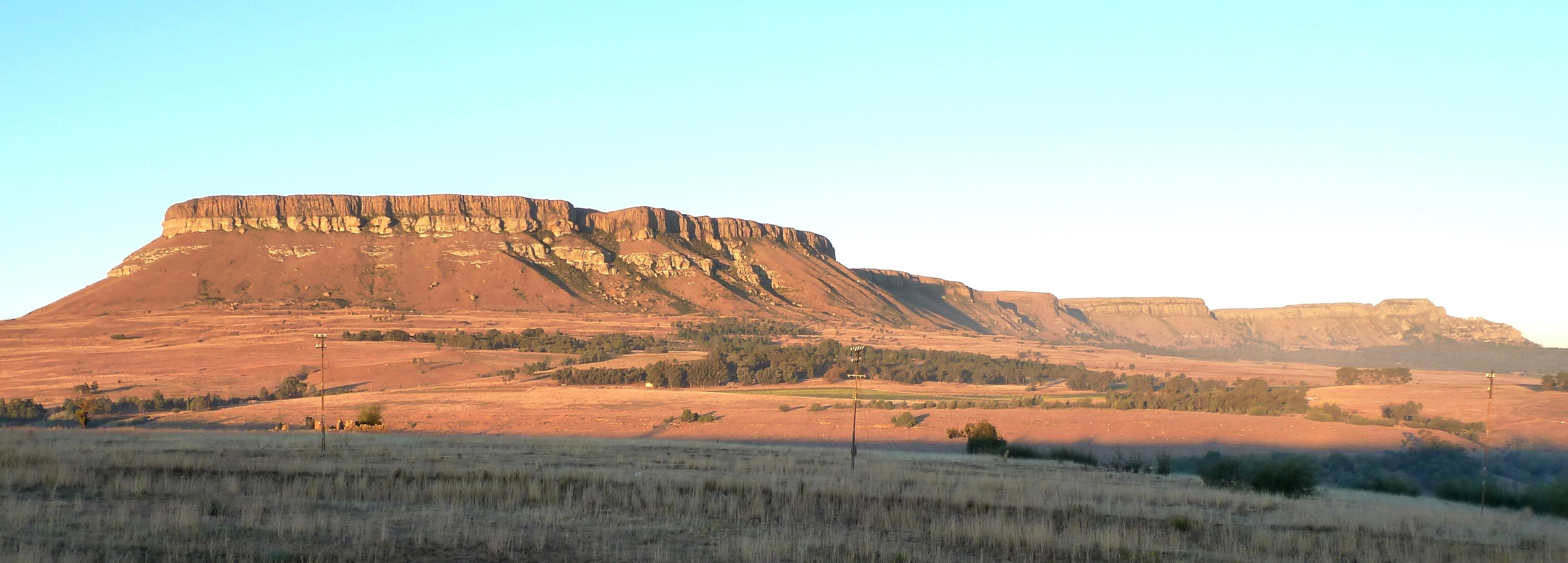
Platberg's western aspect at dusk

- Platberg Reserve – One of the most famous landmarks in the Eastern Free State is the 9-kilometre-long, 2,394-metre-high (7,854 ft) Platberg. The reserve covers the western slopes and summit of the mountain, including the former Drakensberg Botanical Garden (founded as a national botanical garden in 1967 but now defunct), along with numerous trails and the Donkey Pass road to the mountain summit. The reserve is popular with hikers and mountain bike riders. The two dams in the former wildflower gardens are part of a series of aqueducts, flowing from the Gibson Dam on the mountain summit, that were built as a water supply to support the town and the British troops stationed here after the South African War. A well-preserved sandstone blockhouse from that time guards over this water supply. Much of the southern slopes of the mountain are covered in eucalypt, wattle, and other exotic timber plantations from the time when a forestry centre was based here. Akkerbos, near the base of Donkey Pass, is a grove of oak trees that provided a picnic site during a Royal Tour by the British monarchy, including Elizabeth II in 1947. The reserve is home to herds of eland, black wildebeest, blesbok and mountain reedbuck along with introduced species such as waterbuck and fallow deer.
- The annual Platberg Mountain Race is a 15 km foot race, that includes a scrambling ascent and descent of the mountain. This race forms part of the Berg Bohaai festival (literally "mountain mania" in Afrikaans). The race has been described as the "toughest marathon in the world" by Wally Hayward. It originated in 1922 when a British soldier, Major A. E. Belcher, returned to Harrismith where he had been stationed near 42nd Hill during the Second Boer War. He referred to Platberg as "that small hill of yours", and one of the locals immediately bet him that he could not reach the top in less than 60 minutes. He accepted the challenge and covered the distance with eight minutes to spare. Afterwards Major Belcher presented a floating trophy to be awarded as a prize for the first athlete to reach the top of the mountain (the record time today is 22 minutes and 9 seconds). The 15 kilometre race starts from the town's sports grounds, and the route ascends the slopes of Platberg, passing through the terrain where the concentration camp once stood. The top is reached via One Man's Pass, close to which a fort, built during the Second Boer War, is to be seen. After traversing a short stretch along the top, the descent is made via Zig-Zag Pass, and the race is completed at the sports grounds.
- Harrismith Golf Course – The scenic 18-hole golf course, arguably the third oldest in South Africa (after the Royal Cape and George Golf Clubs) was founded in 1887.
- Dirty Harry – The Dirty Harry is a mountain bike race sponsored by the N3 Toll Company. The Dirty Harry also forms part of the popular Berg Bohaai festival. This festival is held annually in early October.

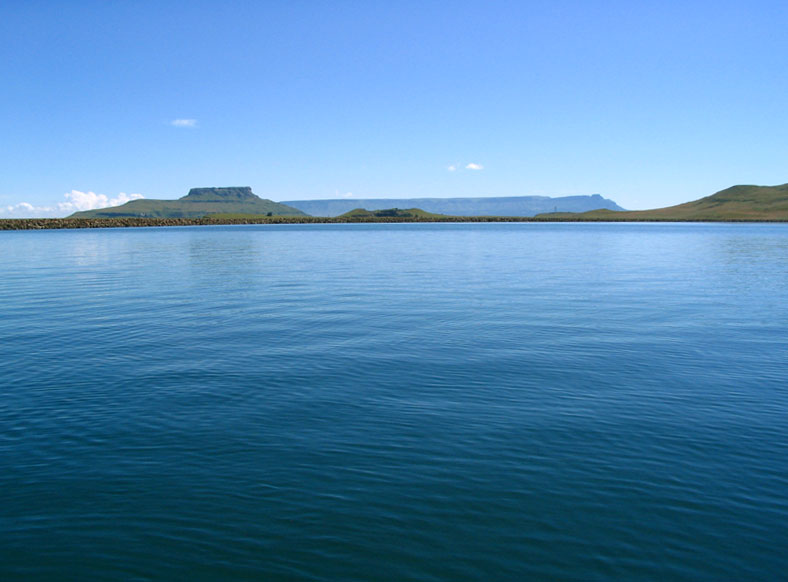
Sterkfontein Dam with Platberg's plateau forming the horizon

- Kerkenberg – The Voortrekkers camped in the area, while their leader, Piet Retief, descended into KwaZulu-Natal to negotiate for land with the Zulu chief Dingane. Retief's daughter painted her father's name and recorded the date, which was also his birthday, on the rock where they held a church service.
- Sterkfontein Dam – The third largest dam in South Africa. Practically all the water is pumped up the escarpment from KwaZulu-Natal. Built before the Lesotho Highlands Water Project was developed, this was a vital source of water for Gauteng. Ideal for water sport enthusiasts and anglers. Sterkfontein Dam is particularly popular with windsurfers.
- Bushmen Paintings – Around 5 kilometers out of town in one of local caves well-preserved Bushmen paintings can still be found.
- Neo Paintings – Around 5 km from town, this Sotho king painted in caves close to the Sterkfontein Dam.
- President Brand Park is a multi-use stadium in Harrismith. It is currently used mostly for football matches and is the home ground of Harrismith United F.C.

== Coats of arms ==
=== Municipal (1) ===
By 1931, the Harrismith municipal council had assumed a pseudo-heraldic coat of arms. The shield was divided by a horizontal line, the upper half depicting three upright maize cobs and three sheaves of wheat on a silver background, and the lower half a cornucopia. The crest was a plough, and the motto Grandescunt aucta labore (i.e. by hard work, all things increase and grow).

=== Municipal (2) ===
A proper coat of arms was designed (by Schalk Pienaar) in the 1970s, and registered at the Bureau of Heraldry in September 1977.

The arms were: Argent, a chevron Azure between in chief an elephant statant proper and in base a demi-cogwheel issuant Gules, two flaunches Vert each charged with an ear of wheat, Or. In layman's terms, the shield is silver and depicts, from top to bottom, an elephant, a blue chevron, and the upper half of a red cogwheel, and on each side is a curved green segment bearing a golden ear of wheat.

Once again, the crest was a plough and the motto was Grandescunt aucta labore.
