= Elands River (Wilge) =

Elands River Namahadi
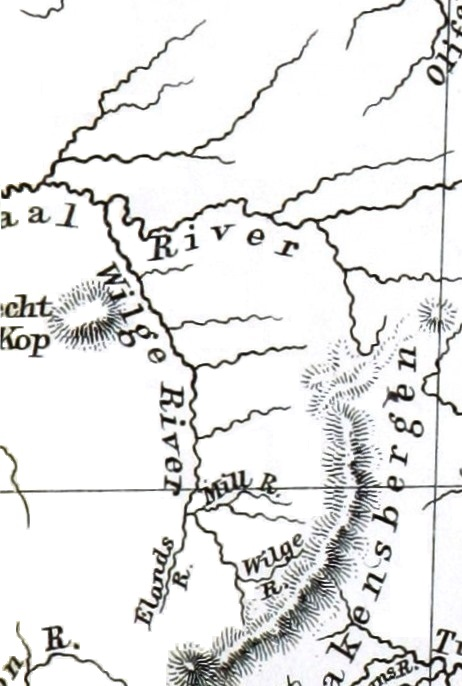
- The Elands shown as a tributary of the Wilge on a map of 1887

- Location of the Vet River mouth
- Etymology: Named after the Common Eland (Taurotragus oryx)

Location
- Country: South Africa
- Region: Free State

Physical characteristics
- Source
  - location: Mont-Aux-Sources
  - elevation: 3,000 m (9,800 ft)
- Mouth: Wilge River
  - coordinates: 28°6′46″S 28°54′11″E
  - elevation: 1,592 m (5,223 ft)

The Elands River (Afrikaans: Elandsrivier) is a northward-flowing tributary of the Wilge River, part of the Vaal River basin, South Africa. Its sources are in the Mont-Aux-Sources.

This river is named the Namahadi River in its uppermost section in the area of the Fika-Patso Dam. It flows roughly northwards, through Phuthaditjhaba (Witsieshoek) and joins the left bank of the Wilge River about 27 km northwest of Harrismith.

Formerly this river had been known as Donkin River, after Rufane Shaw Donkin, who administered the Cape Colony from 1820 to 1821.

== See also ==
- List of rivers in South Africa
