= Mont-Aux-Sources =

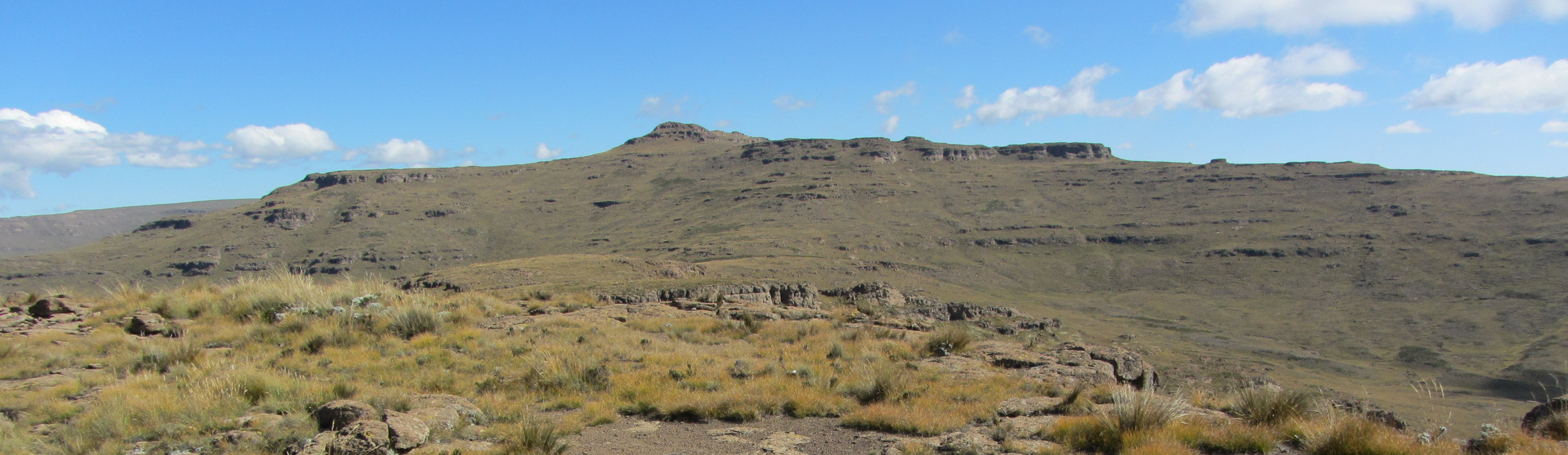
- Mont-Aux-Sources, taken from Crows Nest peak, showing the source of the Tugela at right

Highest point
- Elevation: 3,282 m (10,768 ft)
- Listing: List of mountains in South Africa
- Coordinates: 28°46′21.07″S 28°52′21.72″E

Geography
- Location within South Africa Location within Lesotho
- Location: South Africa and Lesotho
- Parent range: Drakensberg

Mont-aux-Sources is a mountain in Southern Africa, forming one of the highest portions of the Drakensberg Range. It is mostly within Lesotho, with parts in the provinces of KwaZulu-Natal and Free State in South Africa.

The peak is accessible from the Sentinel Car Park near Witsieshoek, via chain ladders.

== Description ==
The Mont-Aux-Sources is part of a basalt plateau which lies at an average elevation of about 3,050 meters (10 000 ft). Among the many escarpments that surround the plateau is a sheer wall of 330 vertical meters, known as the Amphitheatre and the Sentinel. The highest point is a peak 3 km from the Drakensberg escarpment, attaining an altitude of 3,282 metres (10,768 ft).

== Hydrography ==
Since important rivers have their sources in the range, the mountainous area was named mont aux Sources (‘fountains mountain’) by French missionaries who visited the region in 1836.

Several rivers originate in the Mont-Aux-Sources, foremost of which is the Tugela, which flows eastwards into the Indian Ocean on the KwaZulu-Natal coast. Some 7 km from the Mont-Aux-Sources, the Tugela plunges 947 m in a series of falls in the Royal Natal National Park. This is the second-highest series of falls in the world.

The Caledon River, one of the main tributaries of the Orange River, has its sources in this massif and flows along the border with Lesotho. Also the Seati (Khubedu), one of the headwater streams of the Orange River, has its origin near Mont-aux-Sources further to the north.

Another important river is the Elands, named the Namahadi in its uppermost section in the area of the Fika-Patso Dam. The Elands flows roughly northwards into the Wilge River, one of the major tributaries of the Vaal. The Vaal River flows westwards eventually into the Orange River, which in turn flows into the Atlantic Ocean on the West coast of Southern Africa.

== See also ==
- Drakensberg
- List of mountains in South Africa
- List of mountain ranges of South Africa
- Royal Natal National Park
