= Swinburne, Free State =

Swinburne
- Location within Free State (South African province) Location within South Africa
- Coordinates: 28.3483°S 29.2763°E
- Country: South Africa
- Province: Free State
- District: Thabo Mofutsanyane
- Municipality: Maluti a Phofung
- Time zone: UTC+2 (SAST)
- PO box: 9883

Swinburne is a little village just off the N3 road south of Harrismith, in the Free State province of South Africa.

Swinburne is a stopover point for travellers between Johannesburg and Durban, perched on the edge of the Drakensberg escarpment. The village has few amenities above a basic shop, restaurant and pub.

It has one of the oldest bridges in the Free State which was opened 1884 and spans the Wilge River.
