= Fika-Patso Dam =

- Interactive map of Fika-Patso Dam
- Official name: Fika-Patso Dam
- Country: South Africa
- Location: Phuthaditjhaba, Free State
- Coordinates: 28°40′21″S 28°51′24″E
- Purpose: Industrial and domestic
- Opening date: 1986
- Owner: Department of Water Affairs

Dam and spillways
- Type of dam: Earth fill dam
- Impounds: Namahadi River
- Height: 60 m
- Length: 300 m

Reservoir
- Creates: Fika-Patso Dam Reservoir
- Total capacity: 28 000 000 m^{3}
- Surface area: 132 ha

Fika-Patso Dam is a combined earth-fill/rock-fill type dam located on the Namahadi River, the uppermost section of the Elands River, a tributary of the Wilge River.

It is located near Phuthaditjhaba, Free State, South Africa. It was established in 1986 and its primary purpose is water for domestic and industrial usage.

== See also ==
- List of reservoirs and dams in South Africa
- List of rivers of South Africa
