= Vaal Dam =

Dam in South Africa

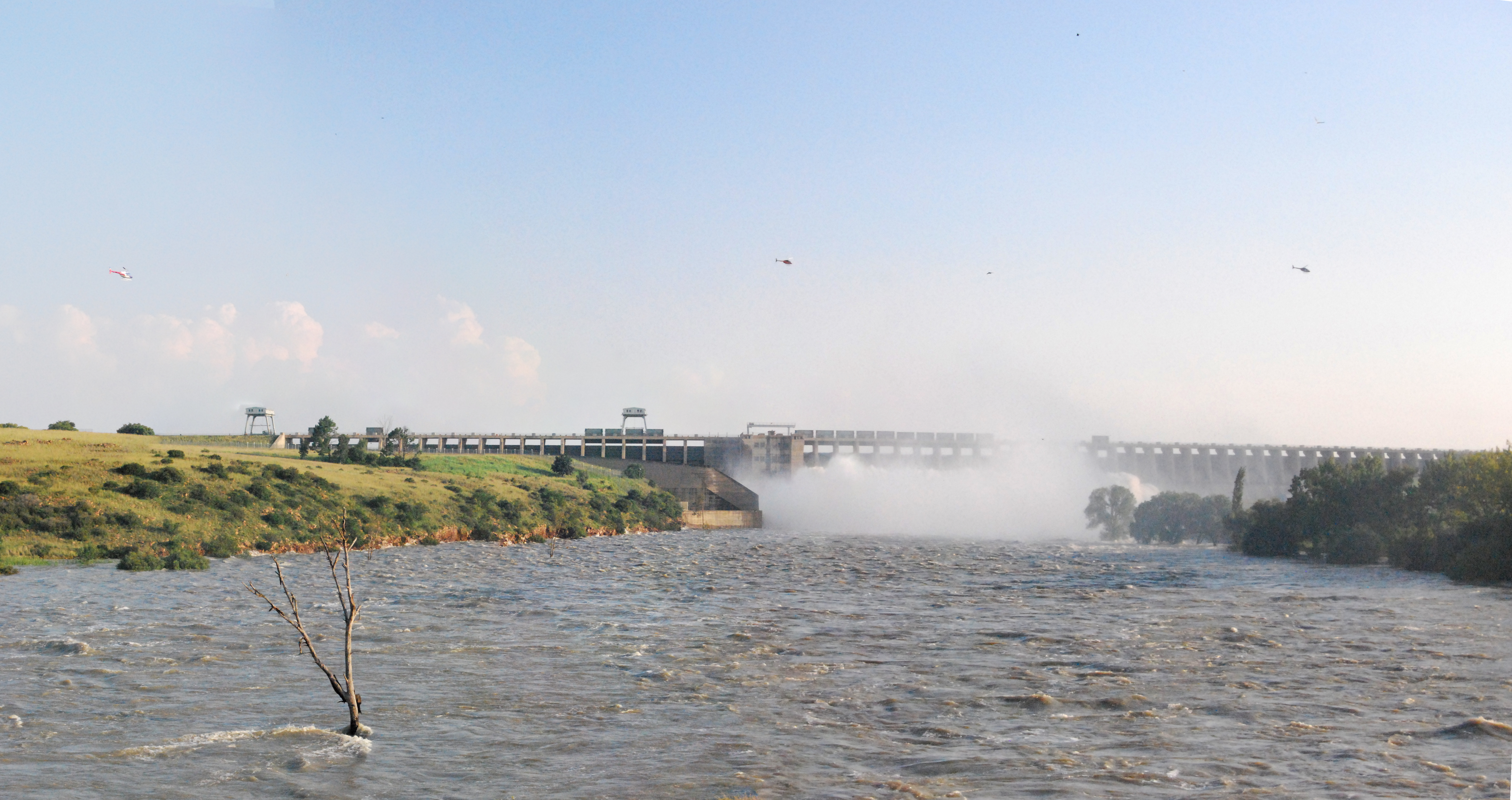

- Location within South Africa
- Official name: Vaal Dam
- Country: South Africa
- Location: Border Gauteng and Free State
- Coordinates: 26.89472°S 28.14555°E
- Purpose: Domestic and industrial water
- Opening date: 1938
- Owner: Dept of Water Affairs

Dam and spillways
- Type of dam: Gravity dam
- Impounds: Vaal River
- Height: 54.2 m (178 ft)

Reservoir
- Creates: Vaal Dam
- Total capacity: 2,609,799,000 cubic metres (9.21642×10^{10} cu ft)
- Surface area: 320 square kilometres (120 sq mi)

The Vaal Dam in South Africa was constructed in 1938 and lies 77 km south of OR Tambo International Airport, Johannesburg. The lake behind the dam wall has a surface area of about 320 square kilometres (120 sq mi) and is 47 meters deep. The Vaal Dam lies on the Vaal River, which is one of South Africa's strongest-flowing rivers. Other rivers flowing into the dam are the Wilge River, Molspruit and Grootspruit. It has over 800 kilometres (500 mi) of shoreline and is South Africa's second biggest dam by area and the fourth largest by volume.

== History ==
The construction of Vaal Dam started during the depression of the early thirties and the dam was completed in 1938 with a wall height of 54.2 metres (178 ft) above lowest foundation and a full supply capacity of 994,000,000 cubic metres (3.51×10^{10} cu ft). The dam is a concrete gravity structure with an earthfill section on the right flank. It was built as a joint venture by Rand Water and the Department of Irrigation (now known as the Department of Water Affairs).

The dam was subsequently raised in the early fifties to a height of 60.3 metres (198 ft) which increased the capacity to 2,188,000,000 cubic metres (7.73×10^{10} cu ft). A second raising took place in 1985 when the wall was raised by a further 3.05 metres (10.0 ft) to 63.4 metres (208 ft) above lowest foundation. The capacity of the dam is currently 2,609,799,000 cubic metres (9.21642×10^{10} cu ft) and a further 663,000,000 cubic metres (2.34×10^{10} cu ft) or 26% can be stored temporarily for flood attenuation.

The flood attenuation properties of the dam were severely tested in February 1996 when the largest flood ever recorded at the Vaal Dam site was experienced. An inflow of over 4,700 cubic metres per second (170,000 cu ft/s) was measured into the Vaal Dam which was already at full capacity due to good rains and it was only through the expert management of the Hydrology staff at DWAF that the maximum flood released from the dam was limited to 2,300 cubic metres per second (81,000 cu ft/s). Flows above 2,300 cubic metres per second (81,000 cu ft/s) would have caused serious damage downstream of Vaal Dam and the situation during the 1996 flood became extremely tense as the storage in the reservoir peaked at 118.5% of Full Supply Capacity on 19 February 1996 i.e. only 194,000,000 cubic metres (6.9×10^{9} cu ft) of flood absorption capacity remained before the full inflow would have been released causing massive damage.

The Lesotho Highlands Water Project feeds water into the system by gravity contributing to a stable supply of water to the people and industrial complex of Gauteng. This water is piped from Lesotho into the Liebenbergsvlei and Wilge Rivers.

The Sterkfontein Dam forms part of the Tugela-Vaal water transfer scheme for the interbasin transfer of water from the Thukela River in KwaZulu-Natal to boost the levels in the Vaal River System. Water from the Sterkfontein Dam is released once the Vaal Dam drops to below 16%.

The dam has its own island some 5 km (3 mi) long. The island was used as a secret meeting place by the apartheid government but now hosts the annual Round the Island Yacht race, a Guinness Book of World Records title of the largest inland yacht race.

On 4 May 1948 BOAC introduced Short Solent flying boats on the UK (Southampton) to South Africa (Vaaldam) service. The small village of Deneysville was used as a stop-over point by the old BOAC flying boats.

== Water sports ==
The Vaal Dam is a fishing venue for freshwater carp and catfish. Its shores are filled with anglers throughout the year.

Many world class water sport events are held here including the annual "Round The Island" yacht race organized by Lake Deneys Yacht Club— a race that has been in the Guinness Book of Records for being the "Most Yachts in an Inland Yacht Race in the World", in which 389 craft crossed the finish line. This race has entered the Guinness Book of Records for the most boats in an inland yacht race. Several large events take place here including Keelboat Week and the Bayshore 200 km jetski race, and now the Bayshore Marina Vaal Dam Treasure Hunt. Lake Deneys Yacht Club and Pennant Nine Yacht Club partnered the organisation of a fleet which participated in the inaugural 2014 and second 2015 international "Bart's Bash".

Three provinces make up the Dam's shoreline - the Free State has the longest stretch, Mpumalanga has a beautiful and relatively unspoilt shoreline, while the most despoiled by far is that of Gauteng. The dam was commissioned in 1939, has a capacity of 2.536 cubic kilometres (2,056,000 acre⋅ft), and a surface area of 320 square kilometres (120 sq mi), the dam wall is 63 metres (207 ft) high. Due to the large lake size reservoir there is a problem with evaporation, see Sterkfontein Dam for more details.

Deneysville is the largest town on the Vaal Dam and provides a shopping centre for the Dam. There are three yacht clubs and two marinas.

== Nature ==
The main angling fish species of the Vaal dam are barbel, common carp, mirror carp, grass carp, smallmouth yellowfish, largemouth yellowfish and mudfish. Egyptian geese and blacksmith lapwing are abundant shore birds, and Caspian terns also occur in large numbers. The greater flamingo is a regular wading bird, with lesser flamingo present in lower numbers, and vagrant openbills have been seen. A few dozen fish eagles are present, while osprey occurs sparsely.

== See also ==
- Vaal River
- Lesotho Highlands Water Project
- Sterkfontein Dam
