= Kilburn Dam =

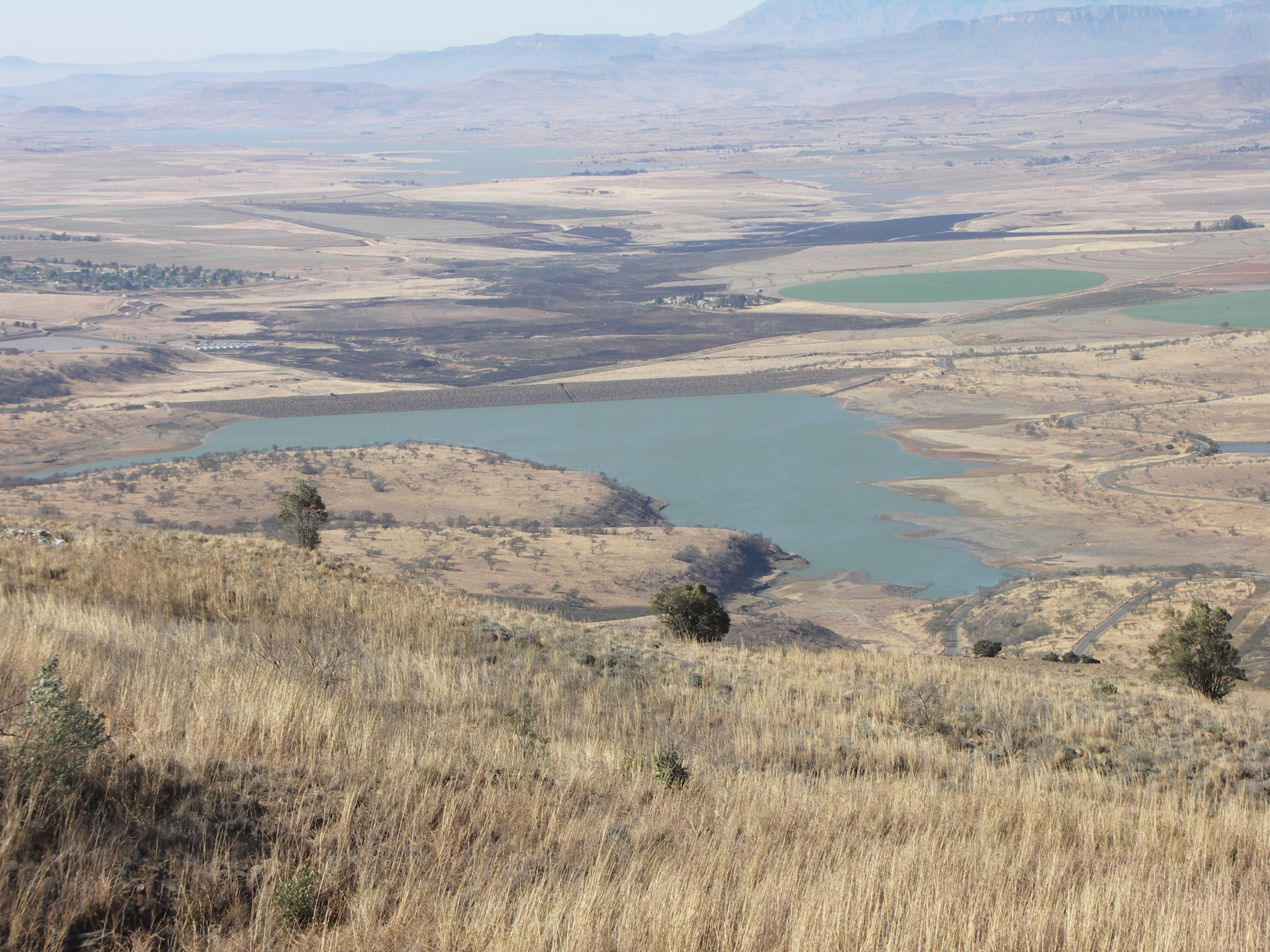
- The Kilburn Dam seen from the viewpoint on the R74 next to Sterkfontein Dam

- Location within South Africa
- Official name: Kilburn Dam
- Location: KwaZulu-Natal, South Africa
- Coordinates: 28.5846°S 29.0945°E
- Opening date: 1981
- Owner: Department of Water Affairs

Dam and spillways
- Type of dam: earth-fill
- Impounds: Majaneni River
- Height: 48 m (157 ft)
- Length: 1,100 m (3,600 ft)

Reservoir
- Creates: Kilburn Dam Reservoir
- Total capacity: 36,700 ML (29,800 acre⋅ft)
- Catchment area: 30 km^{2} (12 sq mi)
- Surface area: 207 ha (510 acres)

Power Station
- Operator: Eskom
- Commission date: 1981
- Type: Pumped Storage
- Turbines: 4
- Installed capacity: 1,000 MW (1,300,000 hp)

The Kilburn Dam, an earth-fill type dam and part of the Tugela-Vaal Water Project and Drakensberg Pumped Storage Scheme, is located 500 metres (1,600 ft) lower than the Sterkfontein Dam, on the Mnjaneni River, near Bergville, KwaZulu-Natal, province of South Africa. The dam was commissioned in 1981, has a capacity of 36,700 cubic metres (1,300,000 cu ft), and a surface area of 207 hectares (510 acres), the dam wall is 48 metres (157 ft) high. The main purpose of the dam assembly is to serve for the generation of hydro-electricity and its hazard potential has been ranked high (3).

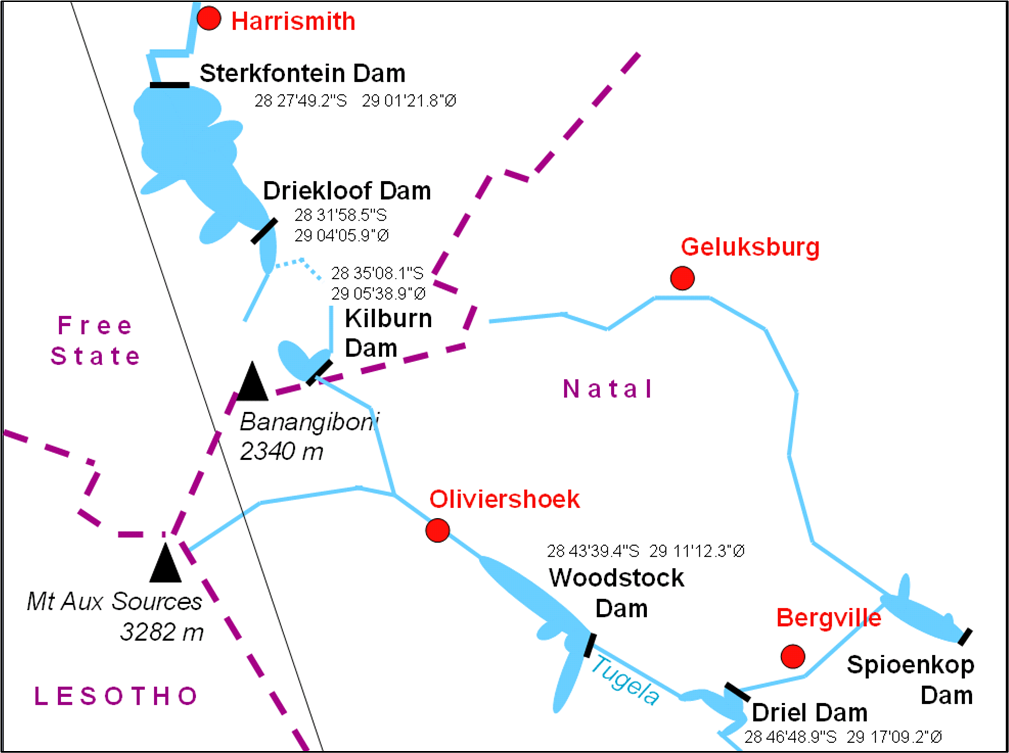
Kilburn Dam's position in the Drakensberg Pumped Storage Scheme

== See also ==
- List of reservoirs and dams in South Africa
- List of rivers of South Africa
