= Woodstock Dam =

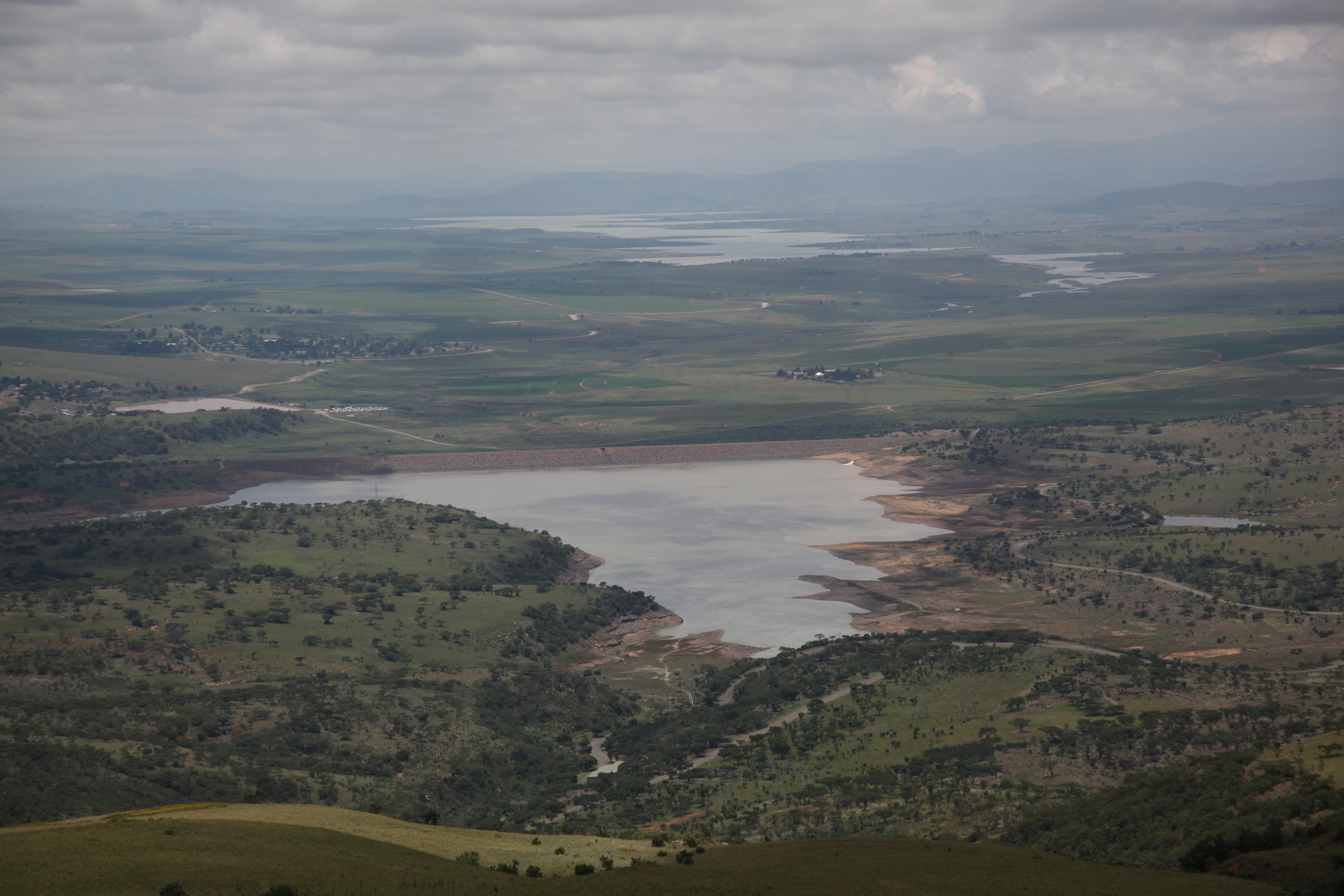
- Woodstock Dam in the background with Kilburn Dam in the foreground
- Interactive map of Woodstock Dam
- Official name: Woodstock Dam
- Country: South Africa
- Location: KwaZulu-Natal
- Coordinates: 28°45′36″S 29°14′45″E
- Purpose: Industrial and domestic
- Opening date: 1982
- Owner: Department of Water Affairs

Dam and spillways
- Type of dam: Earth fill dam
- Impounds: Tugela River
- Height: 54 m (177 ft)
- Length: 865 m (2,838 ft)

Reservoir
- Creates: Woodstock Dam Reservoir
- Total capacity: 373.26×10^{6} m^{3} (302,610 acre⋅ft)
- Catchment area: 1,171 km^{2} (452 sq mi)
- Surface area: 2,916 hectares (7,210 acres)

Power Station
- Type: Pumped-storage

Woodstock Dam is located on the upper reaches of the Tugela, KwaZulu-Natal province of South Africa and is the main source of water for the Thukela-Vaal Transfer Scheme. The dam was commissioned in 1982, has a storage capacity of 373.26 million cubic metres (13.182×10^{9} cu ft), and a surface area of 29.129 square kilometres (11.247 sq mi), the dam wall is 54 metres (177 ft) high. The dam serves mainly for municipal and industrial water supply purposes and its hazard potential has been ranked high (3).

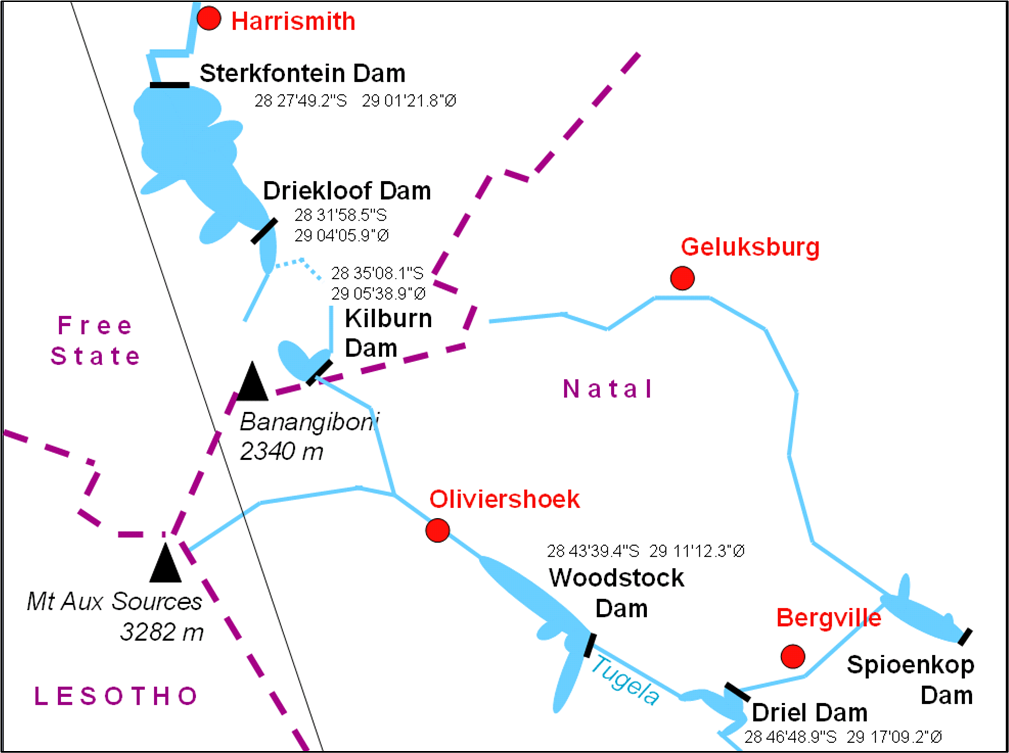
Woodstock dam's position in the Drakensberg Pumped Storage Scheme

== See also ==
- List of reservoirs and dams in South Africa
