= Highveld =

Geographic region of the South African inland plateau

Coordinates: 27°S 28°E

- Natural region
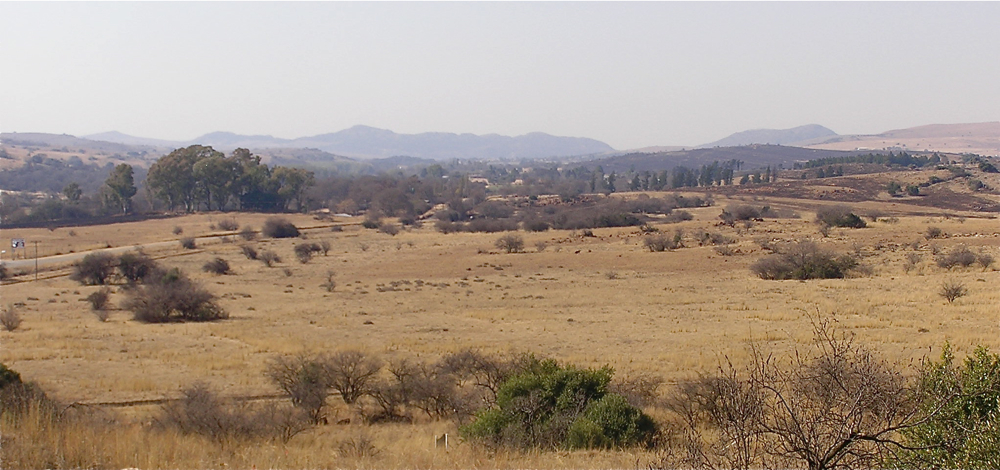
- Highveld in winter in Gauteng Province north of Johannesburg

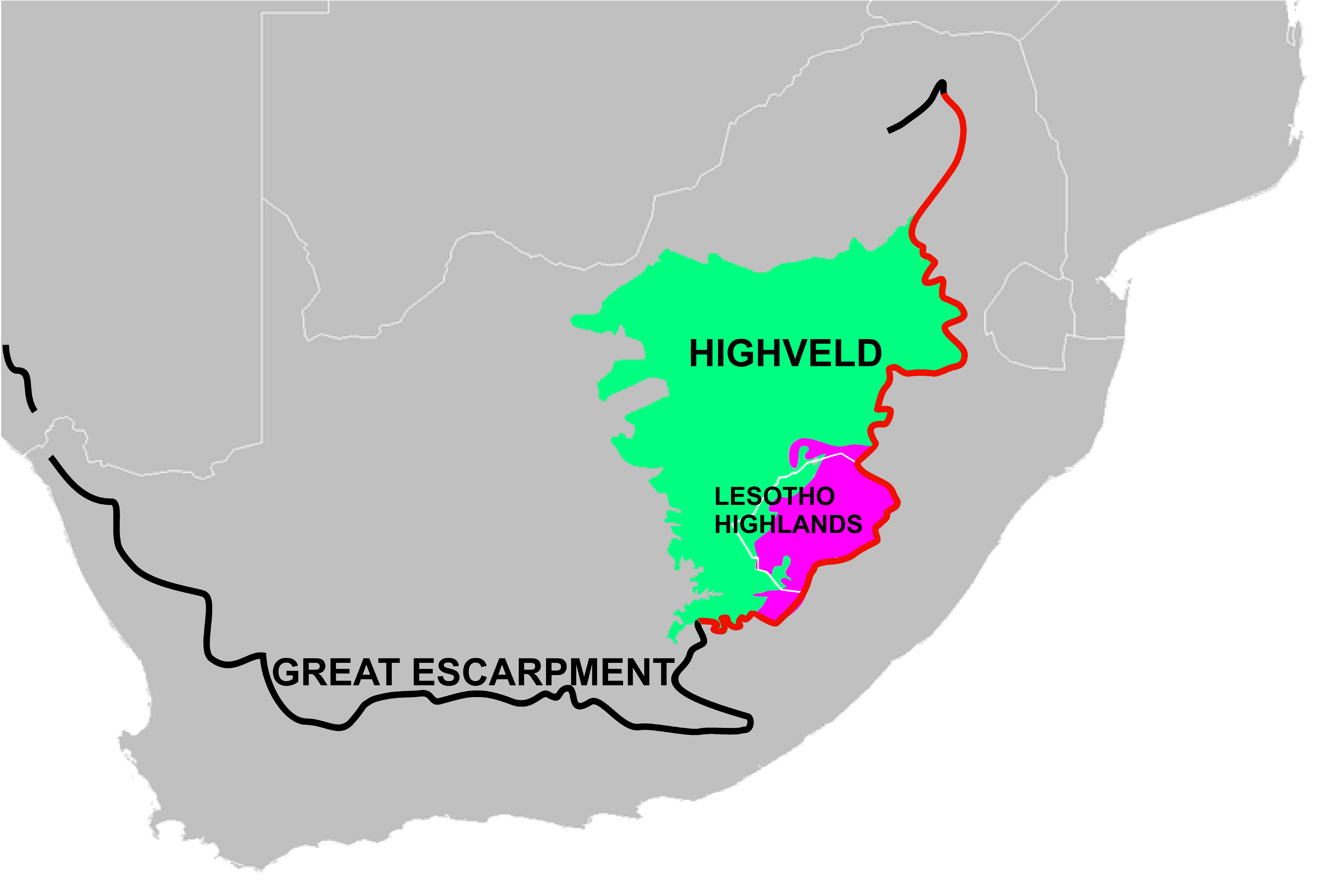
- A map of South Africa showing the central plateau edged by the Great Escarpment and its relationship to the Highveld and Lesotho Highlands: The portion of the Great Escarpment shown in red is officially known as the Drakensberg, although most South Africans think of the Drakensberg as only that portion of the escarpment which forms the border between KwaZulu-Natal and Lesotho. Here, the escarpment rises to its greatest height, over 3000 m.
- Country: South Africa; Lesotho

Area
  - Total: 400,000 km^{2} (150,000 sq mi)

The Highveld (Afrikaans: Hoëveld, pronounced [ˈɦuəfælt], lit. 'High Field') is the portion of the South African inland plateau which has an altitude above roughly 1,500 m (4,900 ft), but below 2,100 m (6,900 ft), thus excluding the Lesotho mountain regions to the south-east of the Highveld. It is home to some of the country's most important commercial farming areas, as well as its largest concentration of metropolitan centres, especially the Gauteng conurbation, which accommodates one-third of South Africa's population.

== Location and description ==
The Highveld constitutes almost all of the provinces of Free State and Gauteng and portions of the surrounding areas: the western rim of Lesotho and portions of the Eastern Cape, Northern Cape, North West, Limpopo, and Mpumalanga provinces of South Africa. The highest part of the Highveld, around 2,100 m (6,900 ft), is its northeastern well-defined boundary, where the plateau escarpment (the Mpumalanga Drakensberg) separates it from the Mpumalanga Lowveld, (containing, amongst others, the Kruger National Park). Another well defined boundary is to its north where the Magaliesberg separates the Highveld from the Bushveld. The continuation of the Great Escarpment to the south separates the Highveld from KwaZulu-Natal. The south-eastern portion of the Great Escarpment (that portion of the Great Escarpment most commonly referred to as the Drakensberg) rises to over 3000 m and forms the boundary between KwaZulu-Natal and Lesotho. The latter mountainous region is, however, not generally referred to as Highveld, whose boundary at this point runs just inside the Lesotho-Free State border, about 2,000 m (6,600 ft). From its eastern boundary, the Highveld slopes gently downwards to be bounded by the Great Karoo to the south, the Kalahari desert to the west, the Bushveld to the north, the Mpumalanga Lowveld to the northeast, KwaZulu-Natal to the east, and the Lesotho Highlands, or Mountains, to the southeast. The Highveld covers an area of almost 400,000 km^{2} (150,000 sq mi), or roughly 30% of South Africa's land area.

The Highveld terrain is generally devoid of mountains, consisting of rolling plains, especially in the Free State, sometimes interrupted by rocky ridges such as the Witwatersrand, the Magaliesberg, and Vredefort Dome. The Vaal River and its tributaries form the main water drainage system of the Highveld. Tributaries of the Orange River drain the most southerly regions of the Highveld.

The Highveld rainy season occurs in summer, with substantial afternoon thunderstorms being typical in November, December, and January. Frost occurs in winter.

== Urban areas and industry ==
Cities located on the Highveld include Johannesburg, Pretoria, Bloemfontein, Vereeniging, Welkom, Carletonville, and the cities of the West Rand and East Rand. The diamond-mining city of Kimberley lies on the border of the Highveld and the southeastern Kalahari.

About half of the gold ever produced in the world has been mined on the Highveld since 1880. The largest deposits are located in the Witwatersrand, which centres on Johannesburg, with smaller deposits in the northern Free State near Welkom and Virginia. The Highveld is also exceedingly rich in diamonds, coal, vanadium, and manganese.

The pollution in this region is also very high, principally due to coal thermal power stations producing nitrogen oxide and sulfur dioxide.

Agriculture on the Highveld is generally dominated by extensive grain production and the grazing of beef cattle, with more intensive production of maize, wheat, sorghum, citrus fruits, groundnuts, sunflowers, and vegetables, occurring in irrigated areas and farmland closer to urban areas. The peat base of the grassland acts as a natural filter, providing sources of clean water.

== Flora ==
Naturally occurring vegetation in the Highveld consists of different types of well-established grassland depending on the varying amounts of rainfall across the area: subtropical and temperate grassland, with true savannah not dominating the ecosystem until more tropical latitudes. The major grass species are Hyparrhenia hirta and Sporobolus pyramidalis and among these are other grasses and herbs. Trees and shrubs never thrived due to the frequent fires that occurred in the dry season and the heavy grazing (once by wild animals and now by livestock).

== Fauna ==
The Highveld is home to a number of endangered animals, including straw-coloured fruit bats; Africa's largest snake, the African rock python (Python sebae); mountain zebras; and South Africa's national bird, the blue crane (Anthropoides paradiseus). The only endemic bird species is Botha's lark (Spizocorys fringillaris) and the two endemic mammals – the Free State pygmy mouse (Mus orangiae) and the rough-haired golden mole (Chrysospalax villosa). As well as the python, other reptiles include the Nile crocodile (Crocodylus niloticus), Nile monitor (Varanus niloticus), rock monitor (Varanus albigularis), and giant girdled lizard or sungazer (Smaug giganteus).

== Threats and preservation ==
Like many other areas of grassland all over the world, the Highveld is excellent agricultural land and most of the area has been converted for farming. The grassland areas now remaining in the natural state are in various nature reserves, which, although a small portion of the Highveld, are still the largest areas of remaining grassland in South Africa. The protected areas include Suikerbosrand Nature Reserve, Verloren Valei Nature Reserve, Nooitgedacht Dam Nature Reserve, Bronkhorstspruit Dam Nature Reserve, Vaal Dam Nature Reserve, and Koppies Dam Nature Reserves and Willem Pretorius Game Reserve.

== Popular culture ==
- The Highveld is featured in Rudyard Kipling's Just So Stories, "How the Leopard Got His Spots".

== See also ==
- Witwatersrand basin – Ridge of erosion-resistant rock in South Africa
- Vredefort impact structure – Largest verified impact structure on Earth
- Transvaal Basin – Geological basin of the Kaapvaal craton
- Lowveld – Type of rural landscape in South Africa
