= Renoster River =

River in Free State, South Africa

Coordinates: 26°58′27″S 26°55′11″E

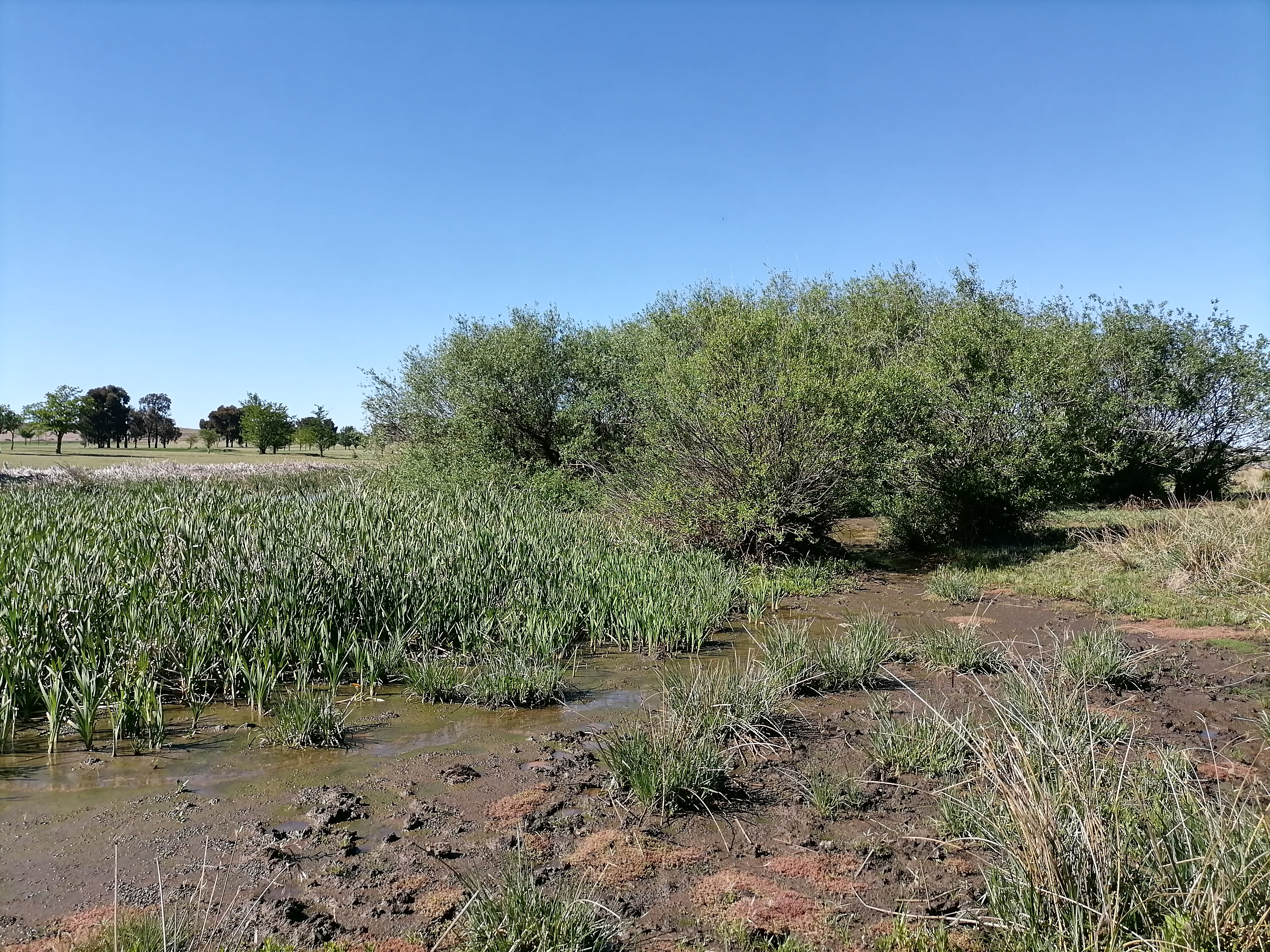
The eye of Renoster river at Rhino Heritage Park, Mamafubedu.

The Renoster River is a large tributary of the Vaal River in the Free State Province of South Africa.

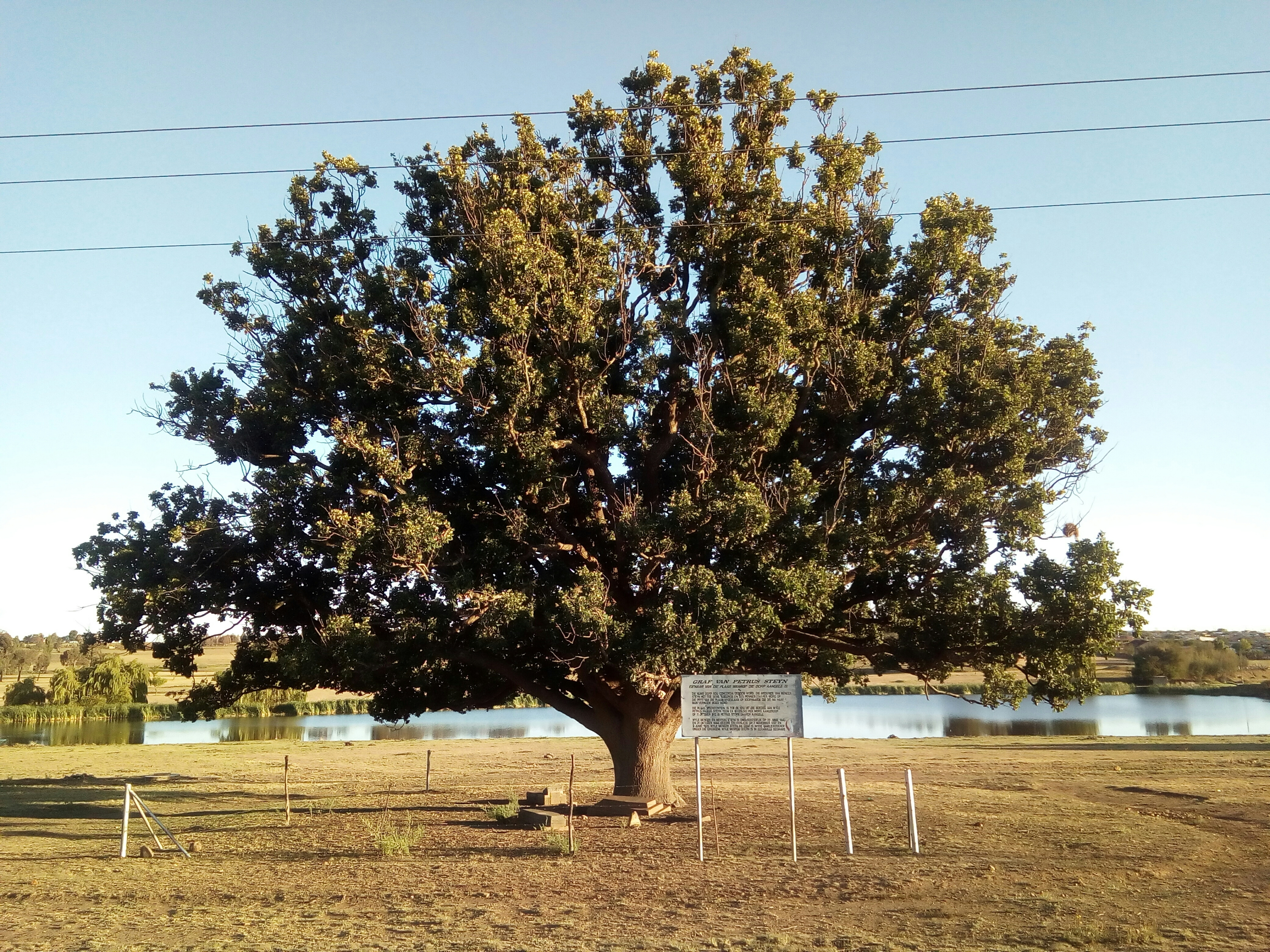
The Steyn family graveyard in Petrus Steyn, a declared heritage site inside Rhino Heritage Park.

The river rises at Petrus Steyn and flows northwest past Heilbron into the Koppies Dam. It then flows west past the village of Koppies and later under the N1 national road. Near Viljoenskroon it turns northwest, flows under the R59 and R501 and joins the Vaal River at Renovaal, approximately 25 km east of Orkney.

The Renoster River has a catchment area of approximately 6650 sq. kilometres. The Koppies Dam is the only large dam on the river and was built primarily for irrigation purposes. The tributaries of the Renoster River are the Doringspruit, Elandspruit, Gelukspruit, Hessebronspruit, Heuningspruit, Karoospruit, Rietspruit and the Vaalbankspruit.

== Rhino Heritage Park ==
Rhino Heritage Park is a community-based heritage and cultural site located in Petrus Steyn in the Free State, South Africa. The park is dedicated to conserving, preserving, and promoting local history, indigenous knowledge, language, and cultural memory. It also serves as a conservation area for birds, fish, wildlife, and plants. The space is being developed into an open-air museum with a focus on heritage education, cultural events, workshops, and community gatherings. In 2017 the park won a Kudu Award from the South African National Parks.
