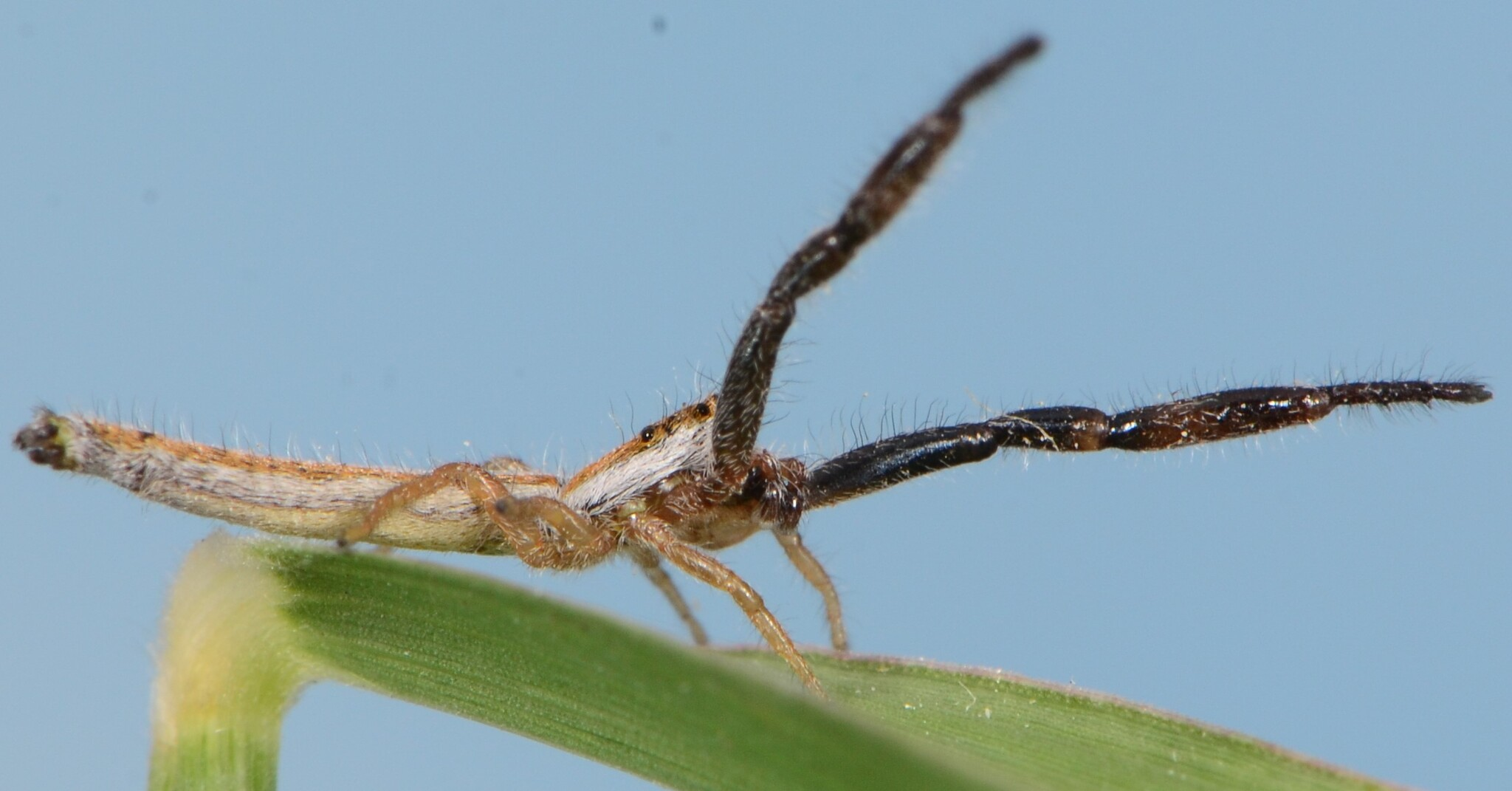
- male
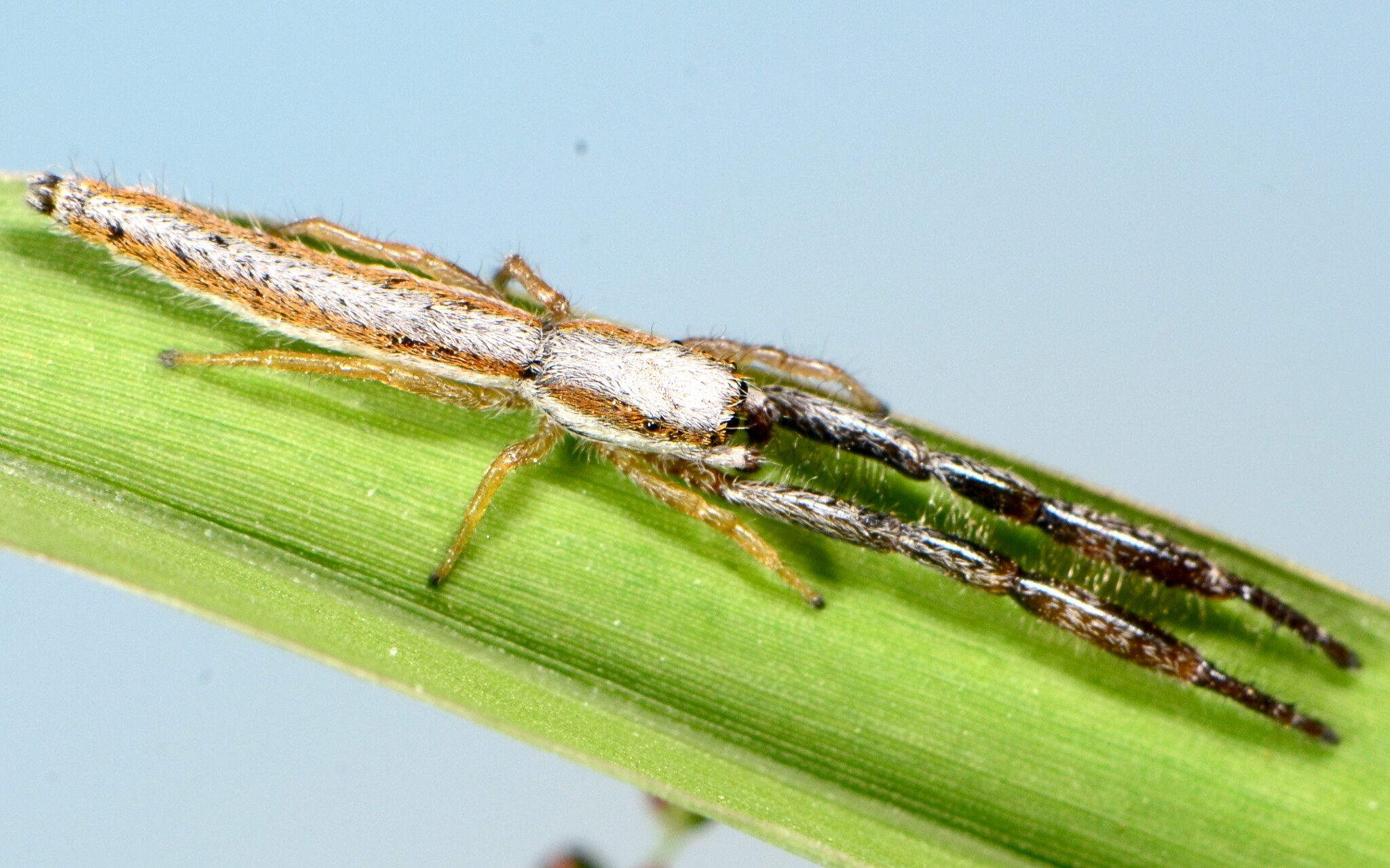
- male

Scientific classification
- Kingdom: Animalia
- Phylum: Arthropoda
- Subphylum: Chelicerata
- Class: Arachnida
- Order: Araneae
- Infraorder: Araneomorphae
- Family: Salticidae
- Genus: Festucula
- Species: F. leroyae

Binomial name
- Festucula leroyae Azarkina & Foord, 2014

= Festucula leroyae =

Leroy's Grass Jumping Spider

Species of spider

Festucula leroyae is a species of spider in the family Salticidae. It is found in southern Africa and is commonly known as Leroy's grass jumping spider.

== Distribution ==
Festucula leroyae is found in Botswana and South Africa.

In South Africa, it has been sampled from Free State, Gauteng, Limpopo, Mpumalanga, and North West. Notable locations include Roodeplaat Dam Nature Reserve, Koppies Dam Nature Reserve, and Kruger National Park.

== Habitat and ecology ==
Festucula leroyae inhabits Grassland and Savanna biomes at altitudes ranging from 1025 to 1488 m.

The species has been sampled while sweeping grasses and is present in high numbers on the grasslands of Gauteng. During a four-year survey at the Roodeplaat Dam Nature Reserve, large numbers of Festucula were sampled and adult males and females were present throughout the year.

== Description ==
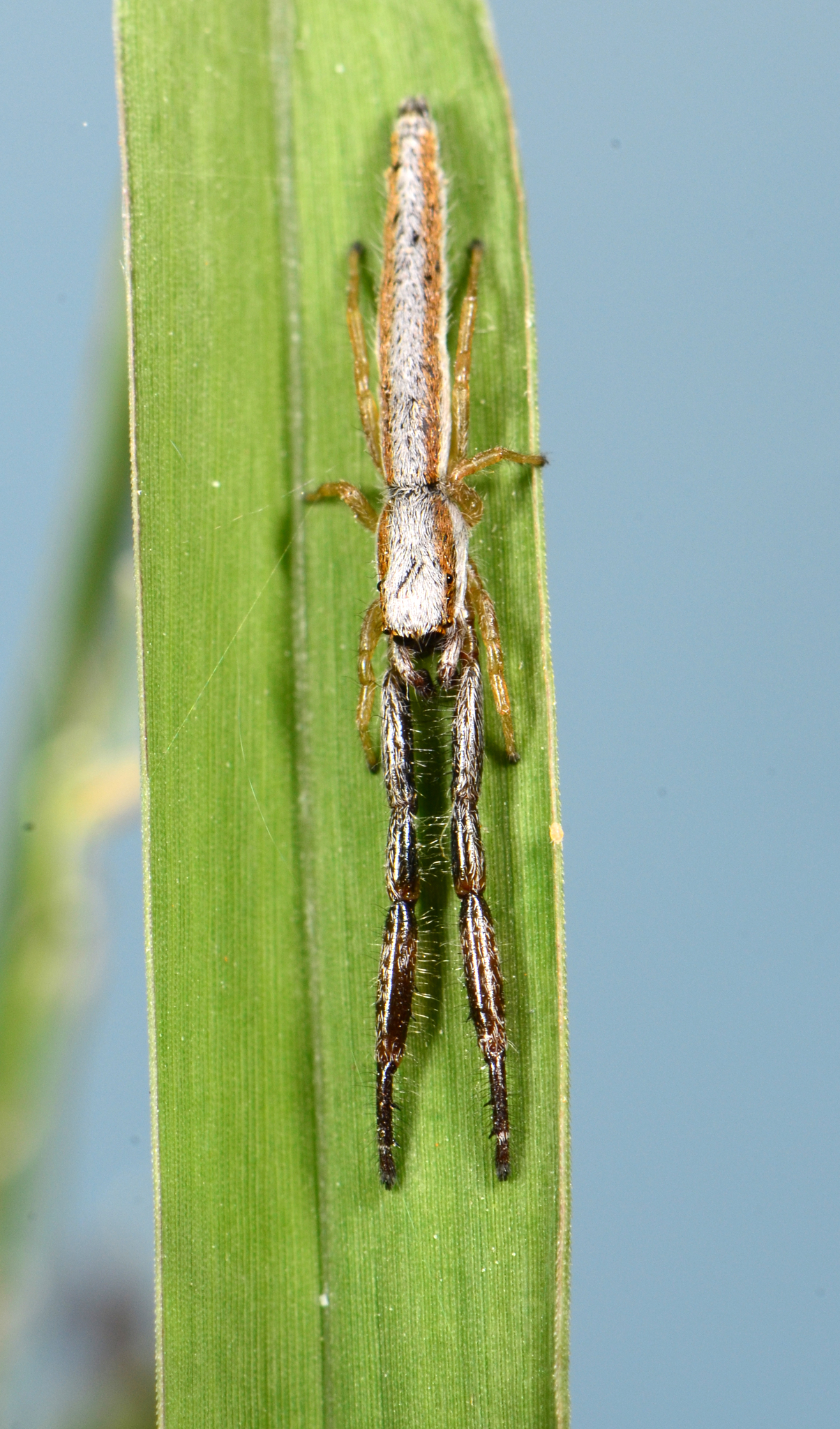
male

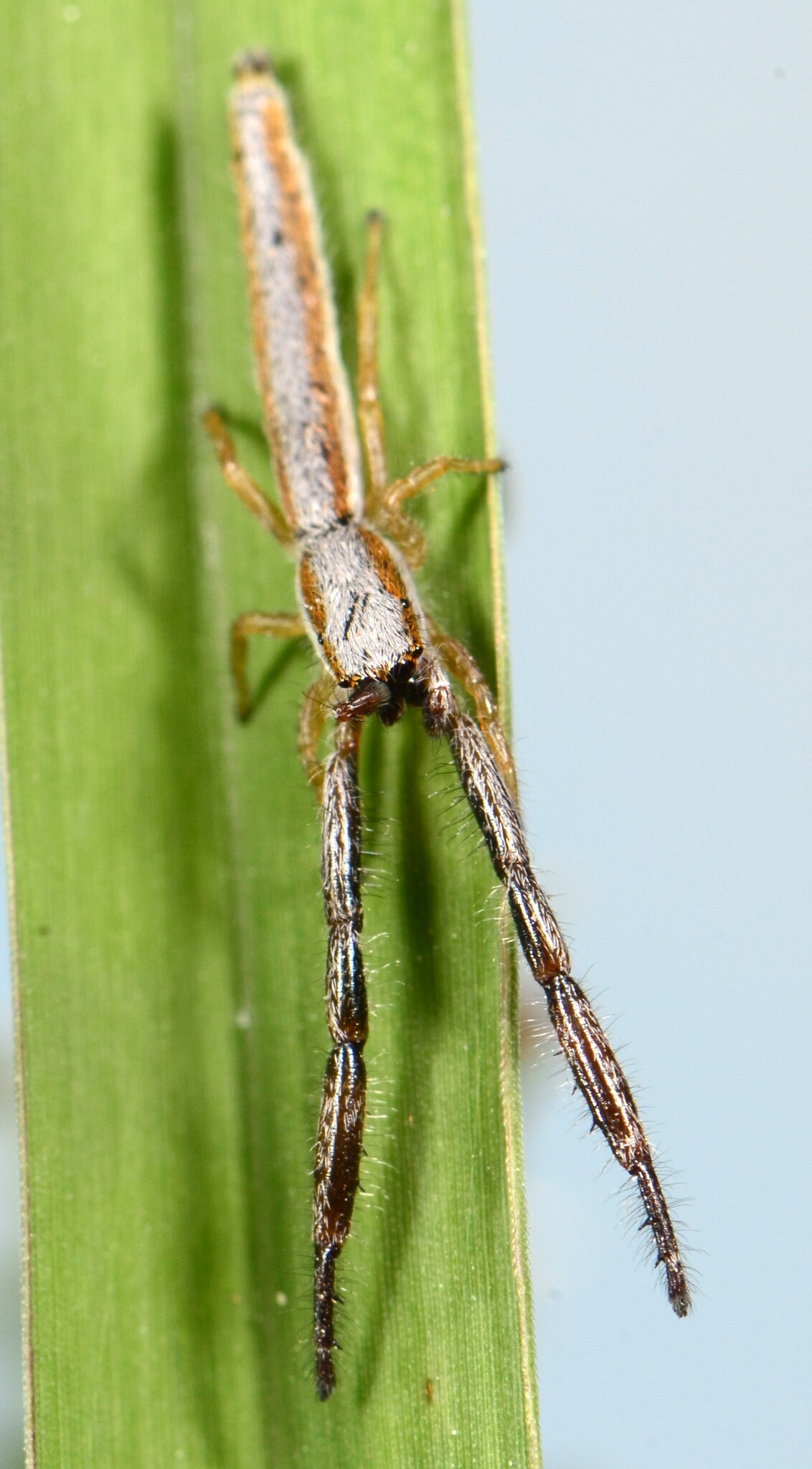
male

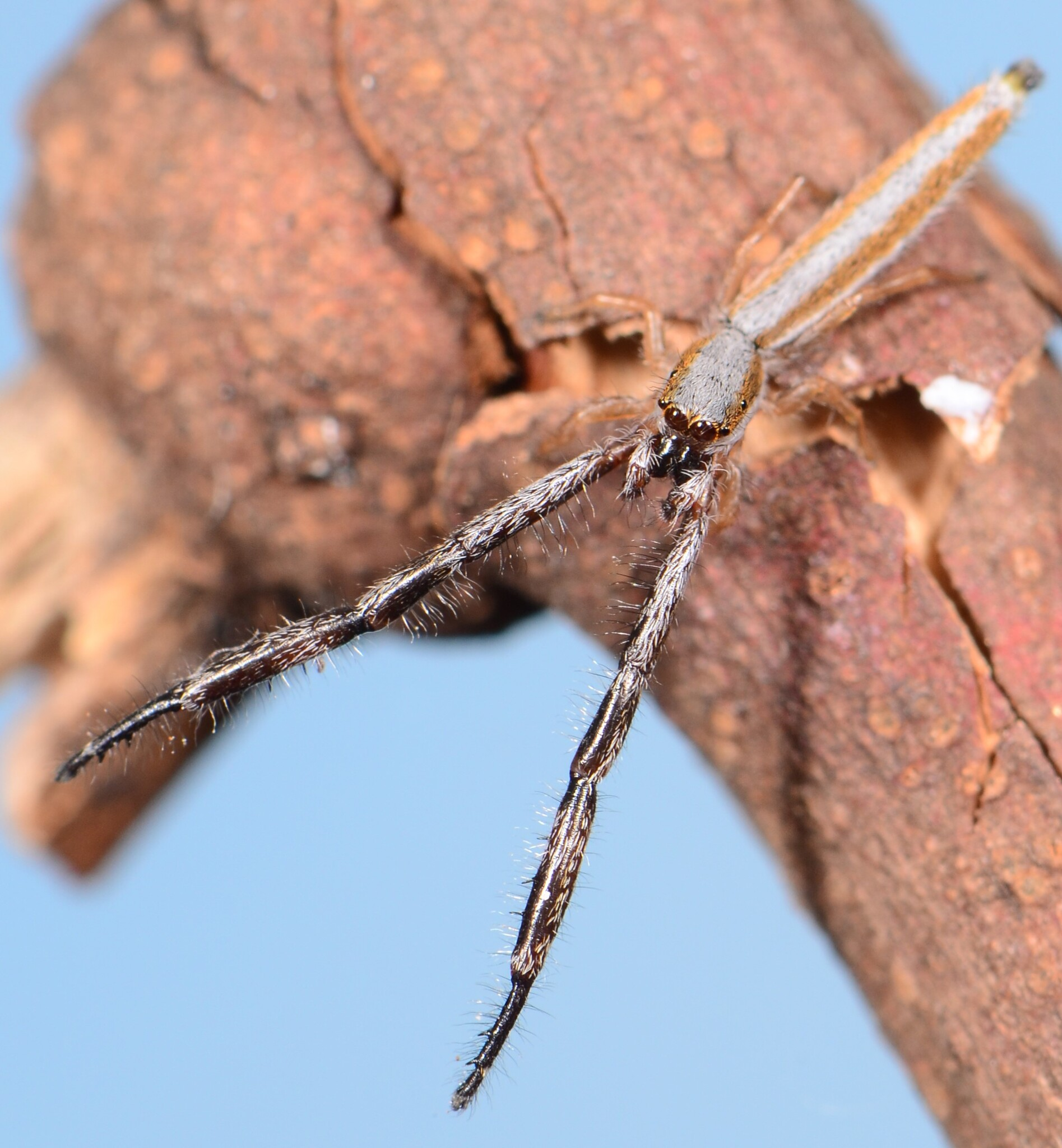
male

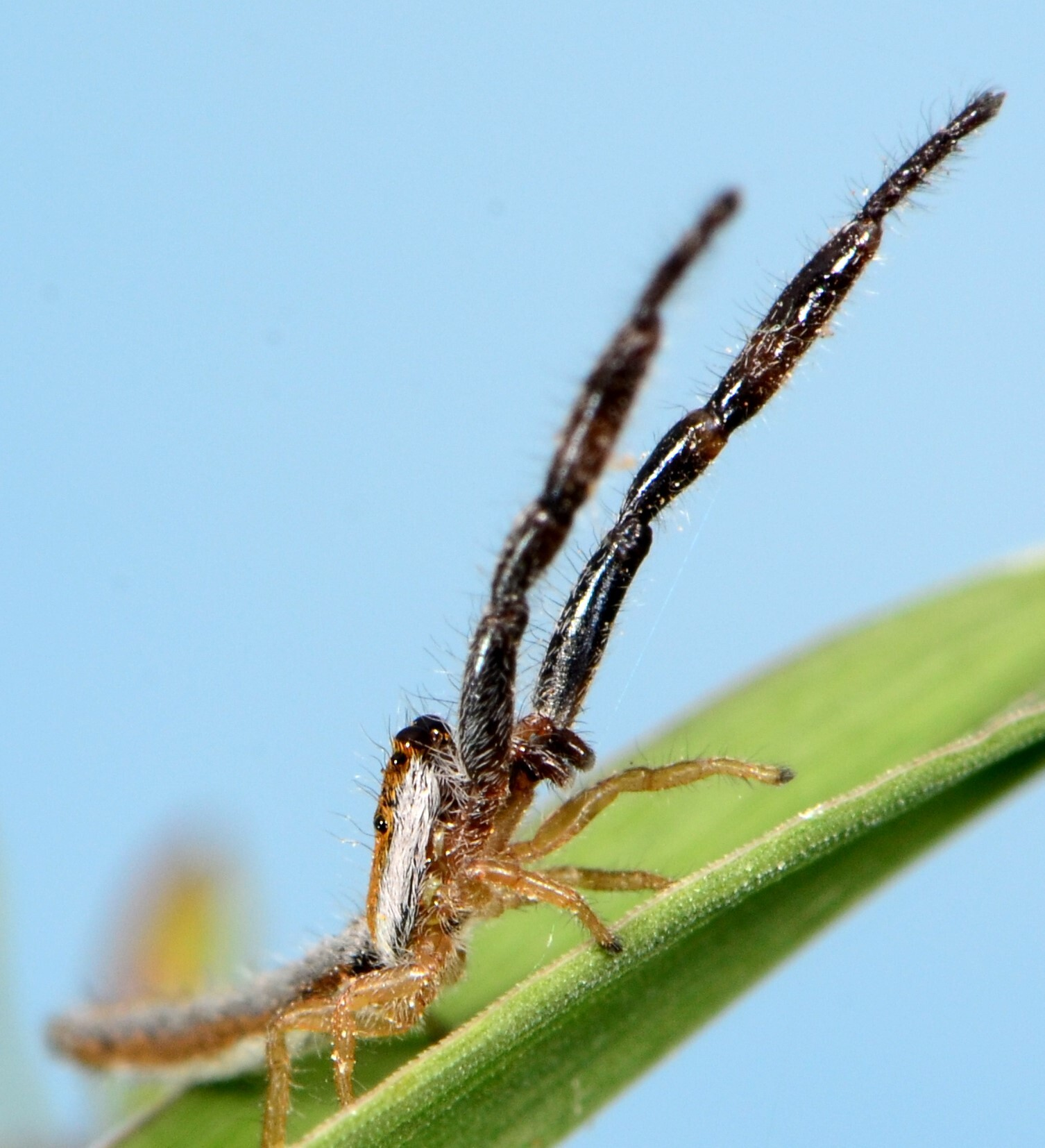
male

== Conservation ==
Festucula leroyae is listed as Least Concern by the South African National Biodiversity Institute due to its wide geographical range. There are no known threats and the species receives protection in seven reserves.

== Taxonomy ==
Festucula leroyae was described by Azarkina and Foord in 2014 from Roodeplaat Dam Nature Reserve.
