= Koppies Dam Nature Reserve =

Nature Reserve in the Free State, South Africa

- Location: Free State, South Africa
- Nearest city: Heilbron
- Coordinates: 27°14′42″S 27°42′58″E
- Area: 4,719.65 ha (11,662.5 acres)
- Established: 12 March 1976; 49 years ago
- Koppies Dam Nature Reserve (South Africa) Koppies Dam Nature Reserve (Free State (South African province))

Koppies Dam Nature Reserve is situated on the highveld of the Free State province of South Africa. The town of Koppies lies 55 km north of Kroonstad, just off the National road N1 and R82 between Kroonstad and Sasolburg. The nature reserve is 16 km east of the town, and is about 4719.65 ha in size. The Renoster and Elandspruit rivers are found within its borders and feed into the Koppies Dam.

== Biodiversity ==
=== Birds ===
There are 250 species of bird recorded in the reserve.

- African red-eyed bulbul
- African spoonbill
- Blue korhaan
- Bokmakierie
- Cisticola
- Cormorant
- Duck
- Glossy ibis
- Heron
- Kalahari scrub robin
- Lark
- Mousebird
- Pipit
- Secretarybird

=== Fish ===
- Yellowfish
- Orange River mudfish
- Carp
- Barbel

=== Vegetation ===
The reserve consists of grassland and acacia thickets, with willow trees found along the Renoster riverbank.

== Activities ==
Fishing, camping and windsurfing can be done in the reserve.

== Accommodation ==
There are 10 chalets in the reserve.

== See also ==
Department: Tourism.
