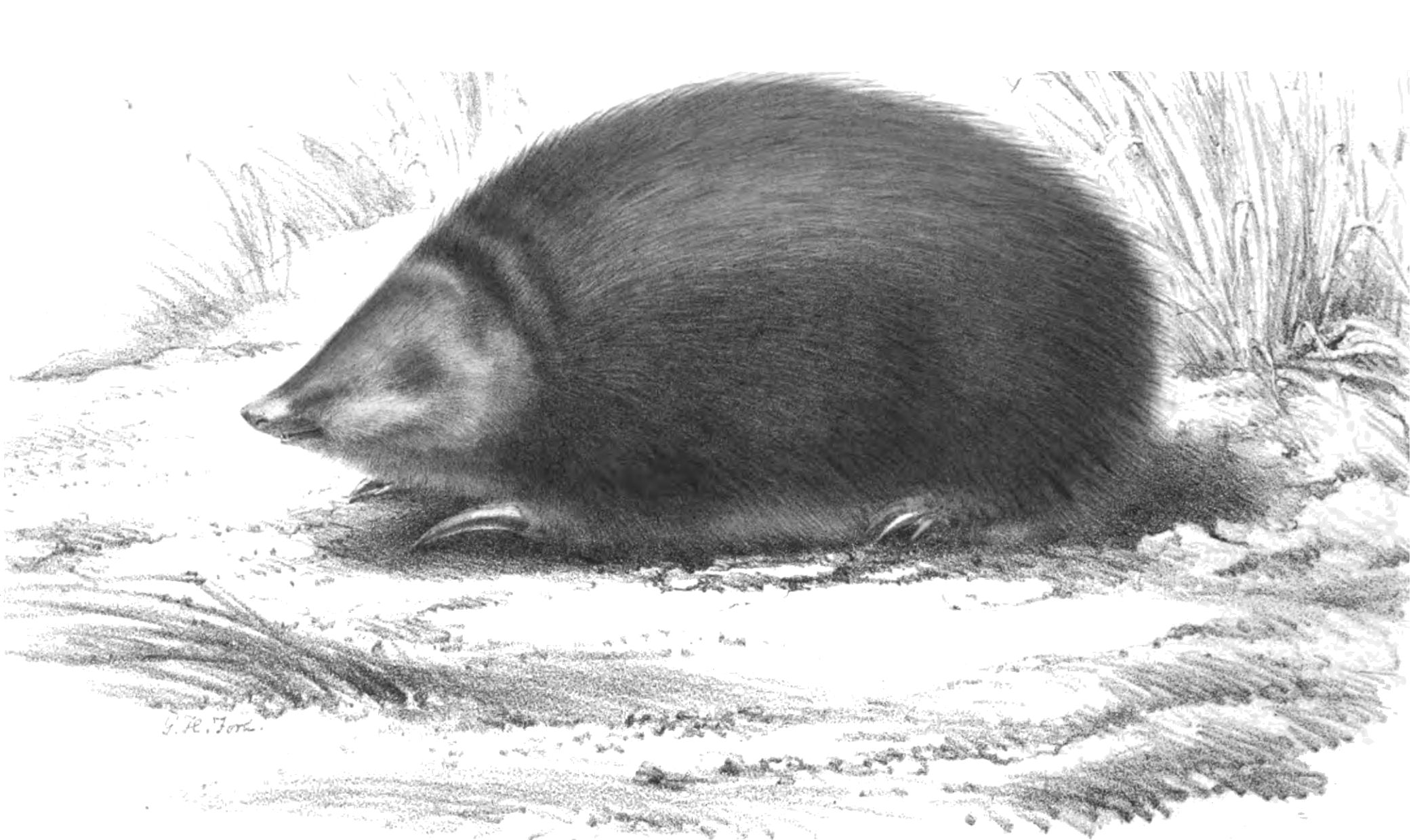

Conservation status
- Vulnerable (IUCN 3.1)

Scientific classification
- Kingdom: Animalia
- Phylum: Chordata
- Class: Mammalia
- Order: Afrosoricida
- Family: Chrysochloridae
- Genus: Chrysospalax
- Species: C. villosus

Binomial name
- Chrysospalax villosus (A. Smith, 1833)

Subspecies
- Chrysospalax villosus dobsoni Chrysospalax villosus leschae Chrysospalax villosus rufopallidus Chrysospalax villosus rufus Chyrsospalax villosus transvaalensis Chrysospalax villosus villosus
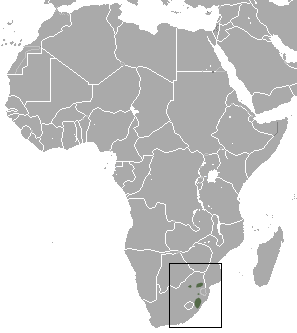
- Rough-haired golden mole range

= Rough-haired golden mole =

Species of mammal

The rough-haired golden mole (Chrysospalax villosus) is a species of mammal that live mostly below ground. They have shiny coats of dense fur and a streamlined, formless appearance. They have no visible eyes or ears; in fact, they are blind - the small eyes are covered with hairy skin. The ears are small and are hidden in the animal's fur.

== Physical description ==
The rough-haired golden mole is generally larger than most of the other species of golden mole, with a total length of 120–175 millimetres (4.7–6.9 in) and a mass of 90–160 grams (3.2–5.6 oz). In the Transvaal region which is associated with land north of modern-day Vaal river in South Africa, males had an average mass of 105 grams (3.7 oz) while females had a range of mass from 65 to 142 grams (2.3 to 5.0 oz). It characteristically has a coarse and long pelage with hairs 18–20 millimetres (0.71–0.79 in) long on the back. The glossy individual hairs of the guard coat on the mid-back are slate-grey at the base with reddish brown to brown at the tip. The under fur is woolly and grey. The claws of the third digit on the front feet are powerful and about 1.6 centimetres (0.63 in) in length and 4 millimetres (0.16 in) across at the base.

== Historic distribution ==
Its natural habitats are temperate grasslands, arable land, pastureland, plantations, rural gardens, and urban areas. Historically throughout Africa it was found scattered throughout the Eastern Cape, KwaZulu-Natal, Gauteng and Mpumalanga. One particular historical site for the mole has been completely transformed by urbanization, the greater Pretoria West region of Gauteng which consists of grasslands where extensive searches for this species over the last 10 years have not yielded any sign of their presence. The Gauteng, KwaZulu Natal and Mpumulanga provincial conservation departments are currently attempting to document and record potential habitat sites that may support rough-haired golden mole populations. There is major concern by these bodies that this mammal may be more threatened than its red list status suggests. The rareness of the species is exemplified by the fact that the capture of one individual in the Glengary region of KwaZulu-Natal in 2003 was the first specimen recorded since 1974, nearly 30 years prior.

== Natural distribution ==
The rough-haired golden mole (Chrysospalax villosus), endemic to South Africa, has a distribution that is characteristically disjunct with records from a number of provinces including the Eastern Cape, KwaZulu Natal, Gauteng and Mpumalanga. Recorded from the extreme eastern parts of the Cape Province through southern and central Kwazulu-Natal to the south-eastern Gauteng.

== Habitat requirements ==
It frequents grasslands and meadows in the savanna and grassland biomes of South Africa, and is extremely secretive. Detecting the presence of rough-haired golden moles is made all the more difficult by their preference for areas with sandy soils and dense vegetation, normally close to water sources. They have a preference for the use of dry ground on the fringes of marshes or damp veils. Possibly for the ease of excavating invertebrates such as worms. They do not make subsurface runs like other golden moles, but excavate burrows, the entrances to which are characterized by loose piles of soil thrown up at the sides and back and which are left open when they leave the burrows to forage. Roberts (1951) thought solitary moles lived in chambers within their burrow systems from which they emerge only after rain. From the entrances, through repeated use, tracks are formed to feeding areas, which are marked by the disturbance of the soil in rooting with the horny pad on their noses. If suddenly alarmed when out of the burrows they quickly return to their shelter. In captivity, Roberts (1951) noted that, irrespective of the direction in which they faced, when they were disturbed their reactions were so rapid and the location of the burrow entrance apparently so well known that it was difficult to follow them as they sought refuge within it.

== Behavior and social organization ==
The rough-haired and giant golden moles live in chambers and passages in mounds reached by a system of tunnels made in part by the golden moles and in part by mole-rats. They are generally solitary and territorial and have been known to fight with competing moles. Their burrow systems open to the surface via a number of ovoid holes that resemble the holes of freshwater crab chambers. These openings often are filled with shallow soil tailings (soil that has been displaced to the side and back), also similar to those of crabs; sometimes a shallow depression is also found at the burrow entrance, and possibly serves as a latrine. The telltale indicators of rough-haired golden moles are rootings made by the leathery nose pad during nocturnal surface foraging bouts. These signs resemble a scuff made by the edge of the heel of a shoe that has been dug superficially into the soil and are usually located very close to the open holes. In wet soils the imprint of their feet can sometimes also be seen. Surface foraging and activity usually follows a period of rainfall. It is not known if these moles also forage in tunnels like other golden moles, but this seems likely given the long periods without rainfall during the dry winter months throughout most of its range.

== Feeding and foraging ==
The rough-haired golden mole sometimes feeds above ground, and, when it does, it roots about like a pig in search of worms and insects. It walks at night to foraging sites that are recognizable by the disturbed soil where these golden moles have rooted for insects with their horny nose pads. They have a pair of bones, called tabulars, in the occipital area of the skull, which are not found in other mammals. The zygomatic arches are formed by elongations of the maxillae. The malleus is tremendously enlarged, and it has been suggested that this actually aids hearing underground (that is, the detection of ground-born vibrations). The diet comprises insects and earthworms but has not been well documented. It is possible that they are generalists that will take any invertebrate or even small vertebrate prey they come across, as is the case with the giant golden mole, Chrysospalax tervelyani.

== Adaptations to adverse environment ==
If disturbed when on the surface, rough-haired golden moles quickly retreat back to the safety of the nearest burrow, and they apparently have a remarkable ability to retrace their steps even under the cover of darkness.

== Threats and conservation ==
The distribution of this golden mole has probably contracted during historical times as a result of habitat alteration associated with mining, power generating plants, as well as urbanization and ecologically unsound agricultural practices in parts of its range. The greatest degradation of its preferred habitat has taken place in the Highveld grasslands of Mpumalanga and Gauteng, as a result of mining shallow coal deposits to fuel the numerous coal fired power stations in this region. Rehabilitation of these sites has largely been ineffective in Afrotherian Conservation Number 3(April 2005) restoring natural plant and animal communities. These power stations form the backbone of South Africa's electricity network, so the magnitude of disturbance is likely to increase as human populations grow and the demand for power increases.

Continual habitat destruction, alteration and human disturbances will result in the disappearance of the majority of sensitive or secretive species. Limited suitable grasslands and seasonal wetland areas remain in the Gauteng Province, especially in the Benoni area. It must be stressed however that the above-mentioned species are extremely difficult to observe and more intensive surveys are required in order to ascertain their current conservation status in the Gauteng Province. No evidence of any of the above-mentioned threatened mammals, although suitable habitat occurs for hedgehogs as well as Rough-haired Golden Moles (seasonally inundated grass and sedge zone).

== Reproduction ==
Very little information is known about this aspect of their life history. Roberts (1951) recorded a female with two fetuses but gave no date of recovery of specimen.

== Sources ==
- EXT, RYNFIELD, and ENVIRONMENTAL IMPACT ASSESSMENT. "CLIENT: VUKA PLANNING SERVICES INC."
- Friedmann Y. & Daly B. (eds.) 2004. Red Data Book of the Mammals of South Africa: A Conservation Assessment. CBSG Southern Africa, Conservation Breeding Specialist Group (SSC/IUCN), Endangered Wildlife Trust. South Africa.
- "IUCN Afrotheria Specialist Group". Afrotherian Conservation.
- Ledger, J. 1999. Southern Africa's Threatened Wildlife. Endangered Wildlife Trust.
- Nowak, R.M. 1999. Walker's Mammals of the World. 6th Ed. The Johns Hopkins Univ. Press, Baltimore.
- ROBERTS, A. 1951. The mammals of South Africa. Central News Agency, Cape Town.
- Skinner J.D. & Smithers, R.H.N. 1990. The mammals of the southern African sub-region. University of Pretoria, Pretoria. Cape and Transvaal Printers.
- "Rough-haired Golden Mole". Animal Info. 2006-06-03.
- Ciszek, Deborah; Myers, Phil (2024-05-10). "Chrysochloridae (golden moles)". Animal Diversity Web.
