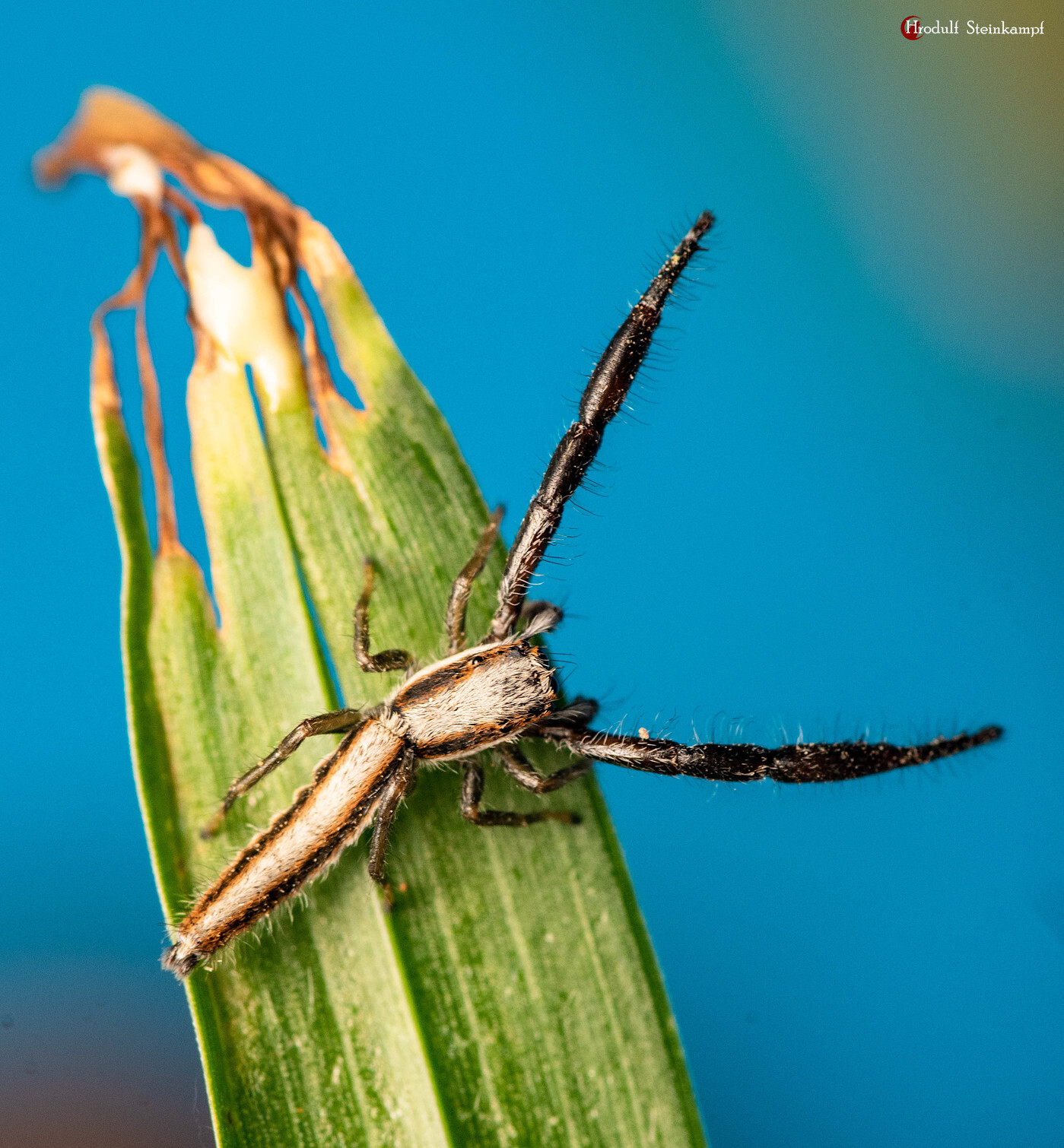
- male
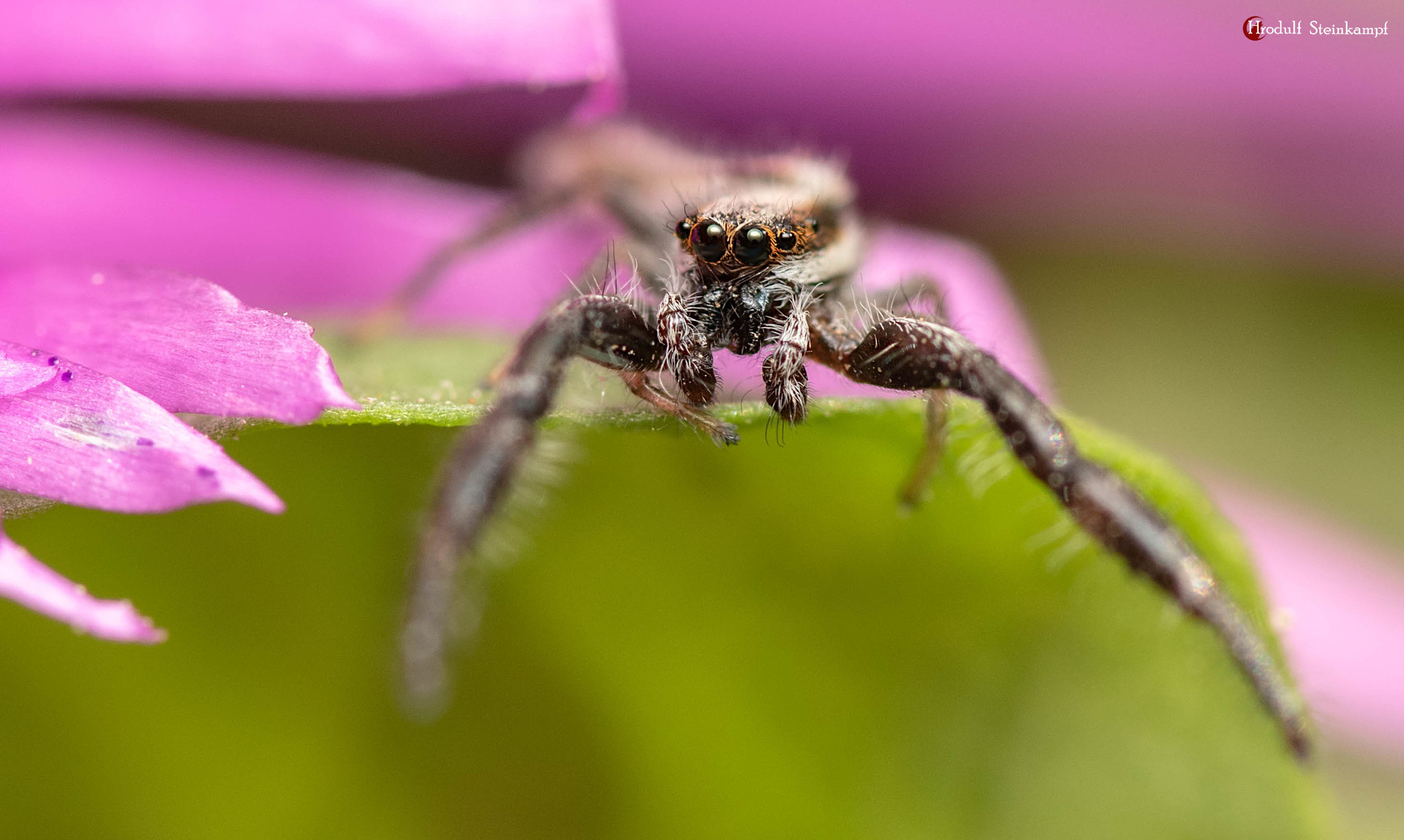
- male

Scientific classification
- Kingdom: Animalia
- Phylum: Arthropoda
- Subphylum: Chelicerata
- Class: Arachnida
- Order: Araneae
- Infraorder: Araneomorphae
- Family: Salticidae
- Genus: Festucula
- Species: F. haddadi

Binomial name
- Festucula haddadi Azarkina & Foord, 2014

Synonyms
- Festucula lawrencei Wesołowska & Haddad, 2009

= Festucula haddadi =

Haddad's Grass Jumping Spider

Species of spider

Festucula haddadi is a species of spider in the family Salticidae. It is endemic to South Africa and is commonly known as Haddad's grass jumping spider.

== Distribution ==
Festucula haddadi is found in South Africa, where it is known from the provinces Mpumalanga and KwaZulu-Natal. Notable locations include iSimangaliso Wetland Park, Ndumo Game Reserve, Tembe Elephant Park, and Ithala Game Reserve.

== Habitat and ecology ==
Festucula haddadi inhabits Grassland and Savanna biomes at altitudes ranging from 4 to 1212 m.

These are free-living plant-dwellers, sampled from grasses and other vegetation.

== Description ==
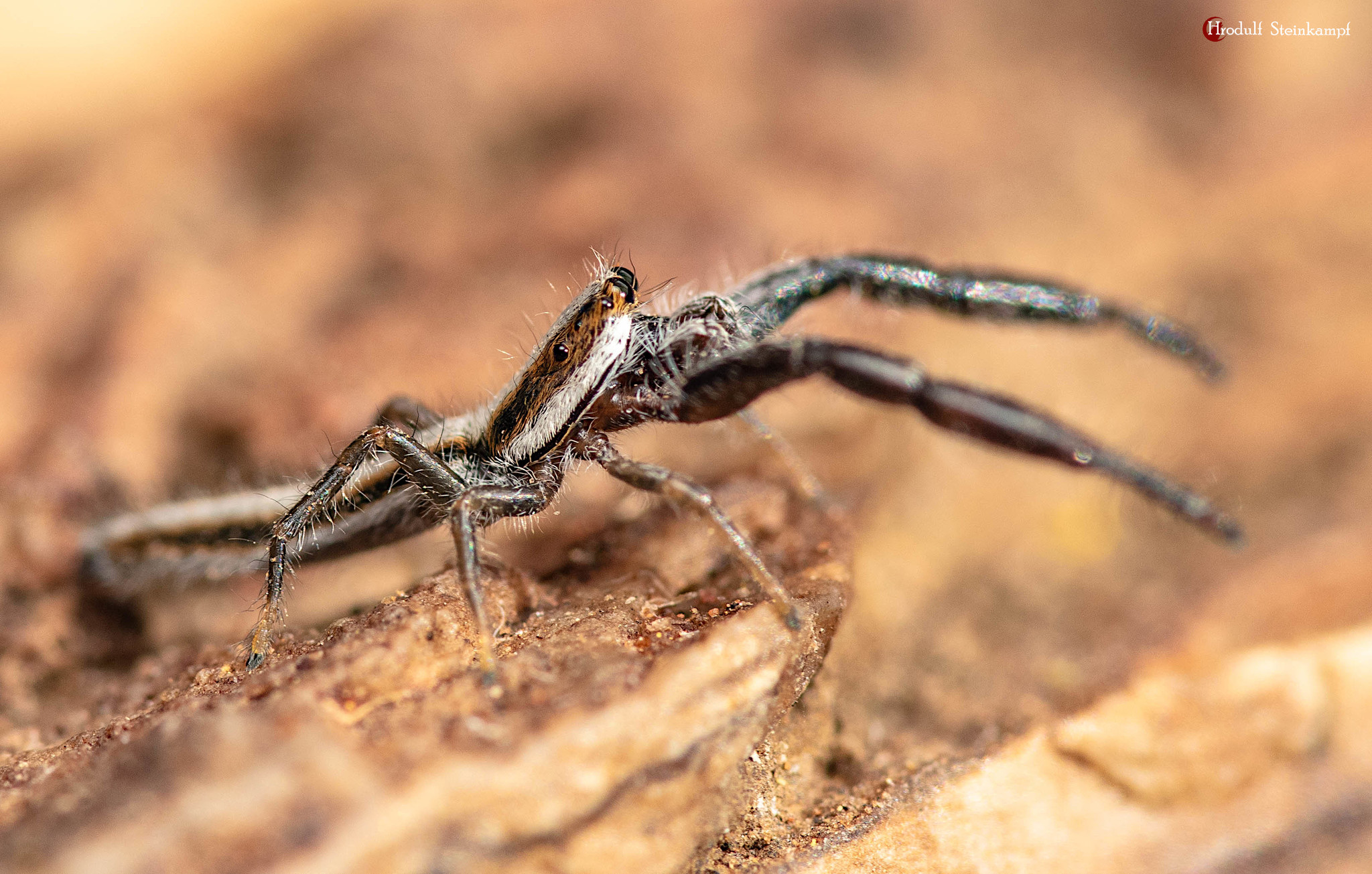
male

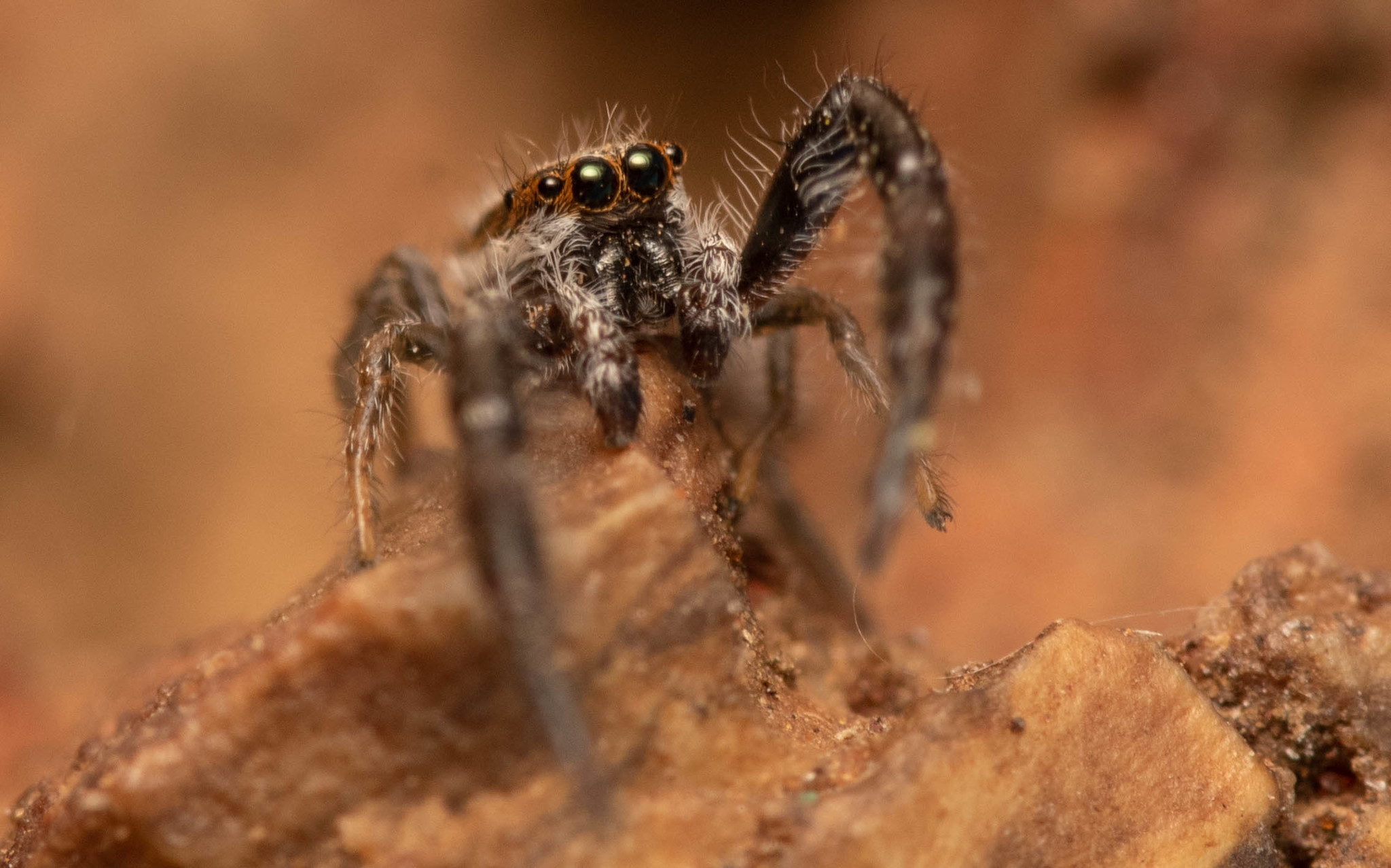
male

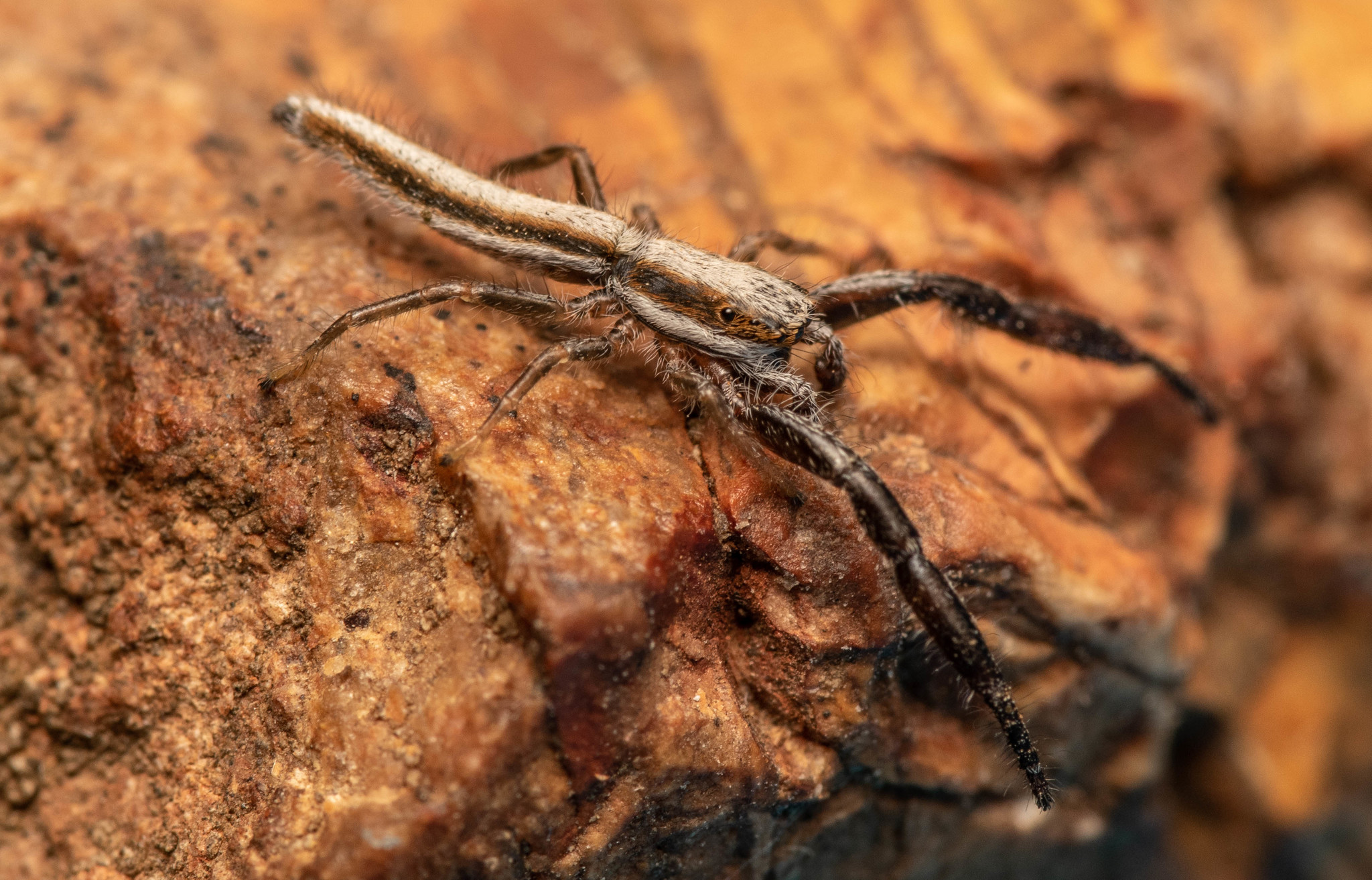
male

Due to their habitat among grasses, the females and males of Festucula haddadi display several co-evolved adaptive characteristics such as a very elongate abdomen, a flat carapace, and light to dark brown longitudinal bands along the carapace and abdomen, all of which aid crypsis in grasses.

== Conservation ==
Festucula haddadi is listed as Least Concern by the South African National Biodiversity Institute due to its wide geographical range. There are no known threats to the species and it is protected in several reserves.

== Taxonomy ==
Festucula haddadi was described by Azarkina and Foord in 2014 from Ndumo Game Reserve in KwaZulu-Natal. The species was previously misidentified by Wesołowska and Haddad in 2009 as Festucula lawrencei.
