= Koppies Dam =

- Location within South Africa Location within Free State (South African province)
- Official name: Koppies Dam
- Location: Free State, South Africa
- Coordinates: 27°15′5″S 27°40′5″E
- Opening date: 1911; 115 years ago
- Operators: Department of Water Affairs and Forestry

Dam and spillways
- Type of dam: gravity & arch
- Impounds: Renoster River
- Height: 25 m (82 ft)
- Length: 2 309 m

Reservoir
- Creates: Koppies Dam Reservoir
- Total capacity: 42 311 000 m³
- Catchment area: 2 155 km^{2}
- Surface area: 1 439 ha

Koppies Dam is a combined gravity and arch type dam located on the Renoster River, near Koppies, Free State, South Africa. The Koppies Dam Nature Reserve contains the dam. It was established in 1911 and its primary purpose is to serve for irrigation and domestic use. The hazard potential of the dam has been ranked high (3).

== History ==
The dam was planned in 1908 when the Orange River Colony allocated £65,000 for a dam and canals. It was completed in February 1912 and was raised twice, lastly in 1971.

== See also ==
- List of reservoirs and dams in South Africa
- List of rivers of South Africa
