= Festucula robusta =

Robust Grass Jumping Spider

Scientific classification
- Kingdom: Animalia
- Phylum: Arthropoda
- Subphylum: Chelicerata
- Class: Arachnida
- Order: Araneae
- Infraorder: Araneomorphae
- Family: Salticidae
- Genus: Festucula
- Species: F. robusta

Binomial name
- Festucula robusta Azarkina & Foord, 2014

Synonyms
- Festucula robustus Azarkina & Foord, 2014

Species of spider

Festucula robusta is a species of spider in the family Salticidae. It is endemic to South Africa and is commonly known as robust grass jumping spider.

== Distribution ==
Festucula robusta is found in Gauteng and KwaZulu-Natal provinces in South Africa

== Habitat and ecology ==
Festucula robusta inhabits Grassland and Savanna biomes at altitudes ranging from 296 to 1114 m.

The species was sampled from grasses.

== Description ==
Compared to other Festucula species, F. robusta is larger in body size.

== Conservation ==
Festucula robusta is listed as Data Deficient by the South African National Biodiversity Institute due to its small range. Only one other record from KwaZulu-Natal is known. The status of the species remains obscure and some more sampling is needed to determine its range.

== Taxonomy ==
Festucula robusta was described by Azarkina and Foord in 2014 from Kromdraai, Krugersdorp in Gauteng.
