= Allemanskraal Dam =

- Interactive map of Allemanskraal Dam
- Official name: Allemanskraal Dam
- Country: South Africa
- Location: Free State
- Coordinates: 28°17′15″S 27°9′1″E
- Purpose: Household
- Opening date: 1960
- Owner: Department of Water Affairs

Dam and spillways
- Type of dam: Gravity dam
- Impounds: Sand River
- Height: 38 m (125 ft)
- Length: 140 m (460 ft)

Reservoir
- Creates: Allemanskraal Dam Reservoir
- Total capacity: 174,500 m^{3} (6,160,000 cu ft)
- Surface area: 265 ha (650 acres)

The Allemanskraal Dam is a dam in the Free State province of South Africa, on the Sand River. It was established in 1960. The reservoir has a gross capacity of 174,500 cubic metres (6,160,000 cu ft), and a surface area of 26.481 square kilometres (10.224 sq mi), the dam wall is 38 metres (125 ft) high.

The dam is surrounded by, and forms part of the Willem Pretorius Game Reserve.

== See also ==
- List of reservoirs and dams in South Africa
- List of rivers in South Africa
