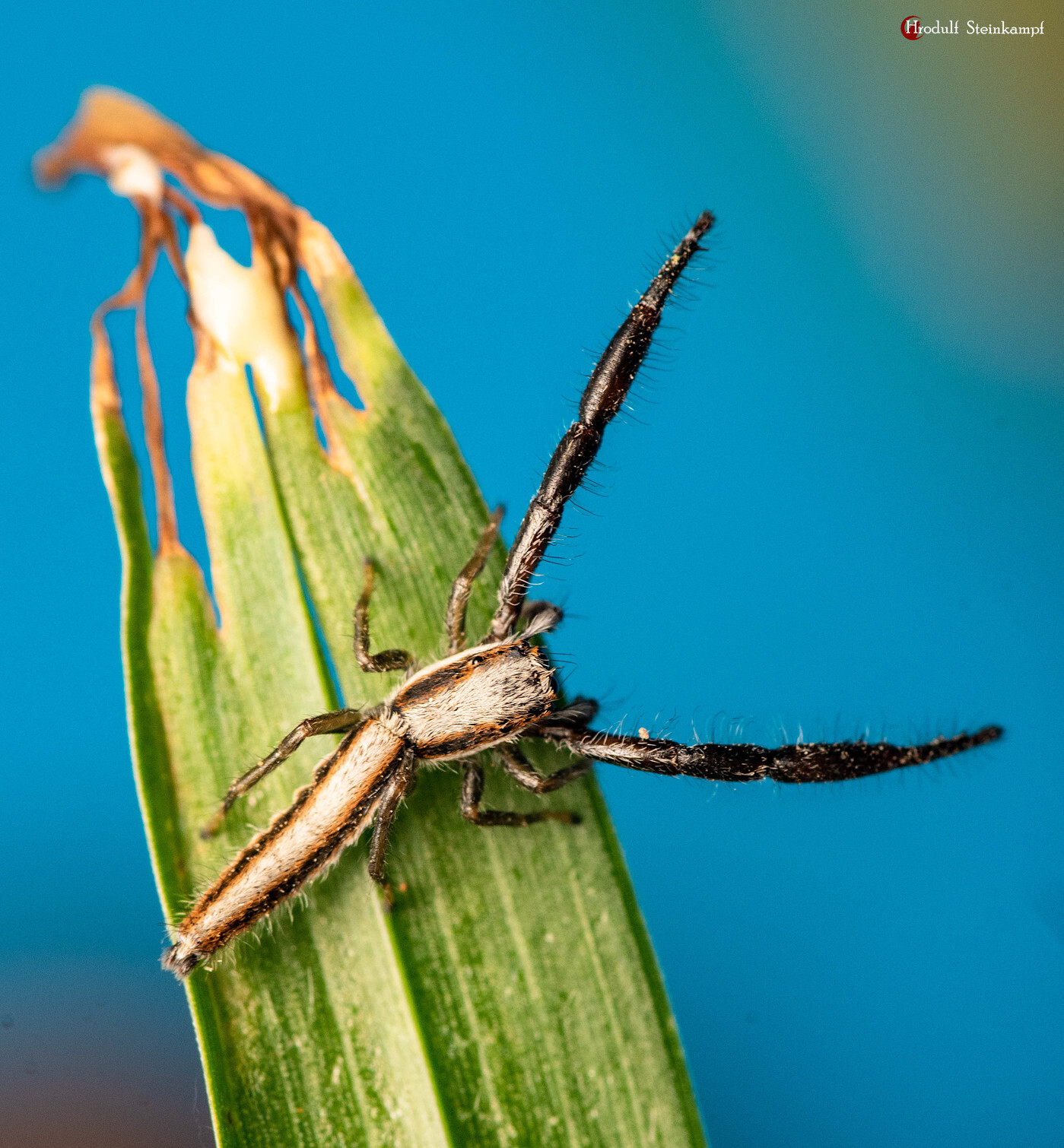
- male F. haddadi
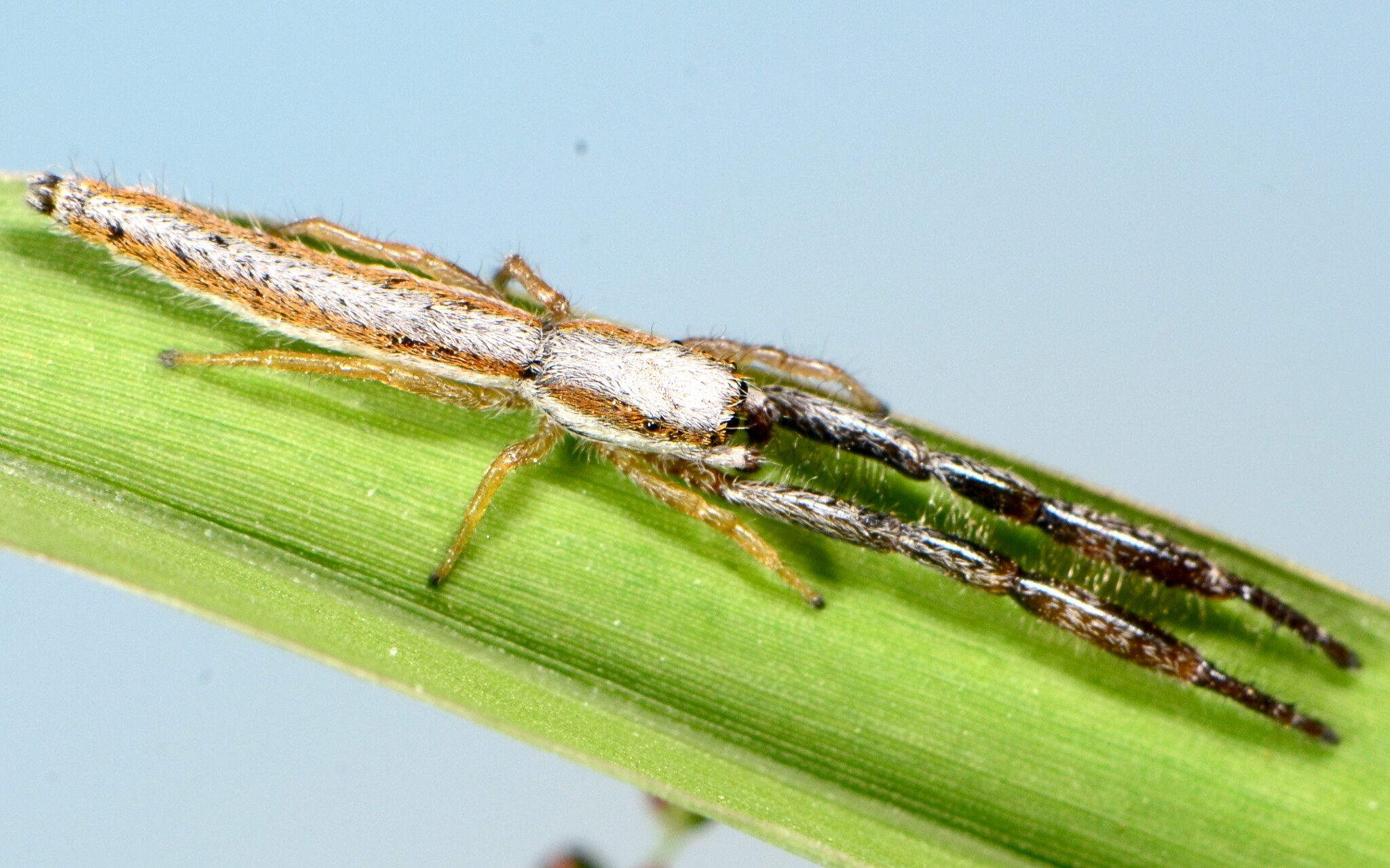
- male F. leroyae

Scientific classification
- Kingdom: Animalia
- Phylum: Arthropoda
- Subphylum: Chelicerata
- Class: Arachnida
- Order: Araneae
- Infraorder: Araneomorphae
- Family: Salticidae
- Subfamily: Salticinae
- Genus: Festucula; Simon, 1901

Type species
- F. vermiformis Simon, 1901

Species
- 10, see text

= Festucula =

Genus of spiders

Festucula is an African genus of jumping spiders that was first described by Eugène Louis Simon in 1901.

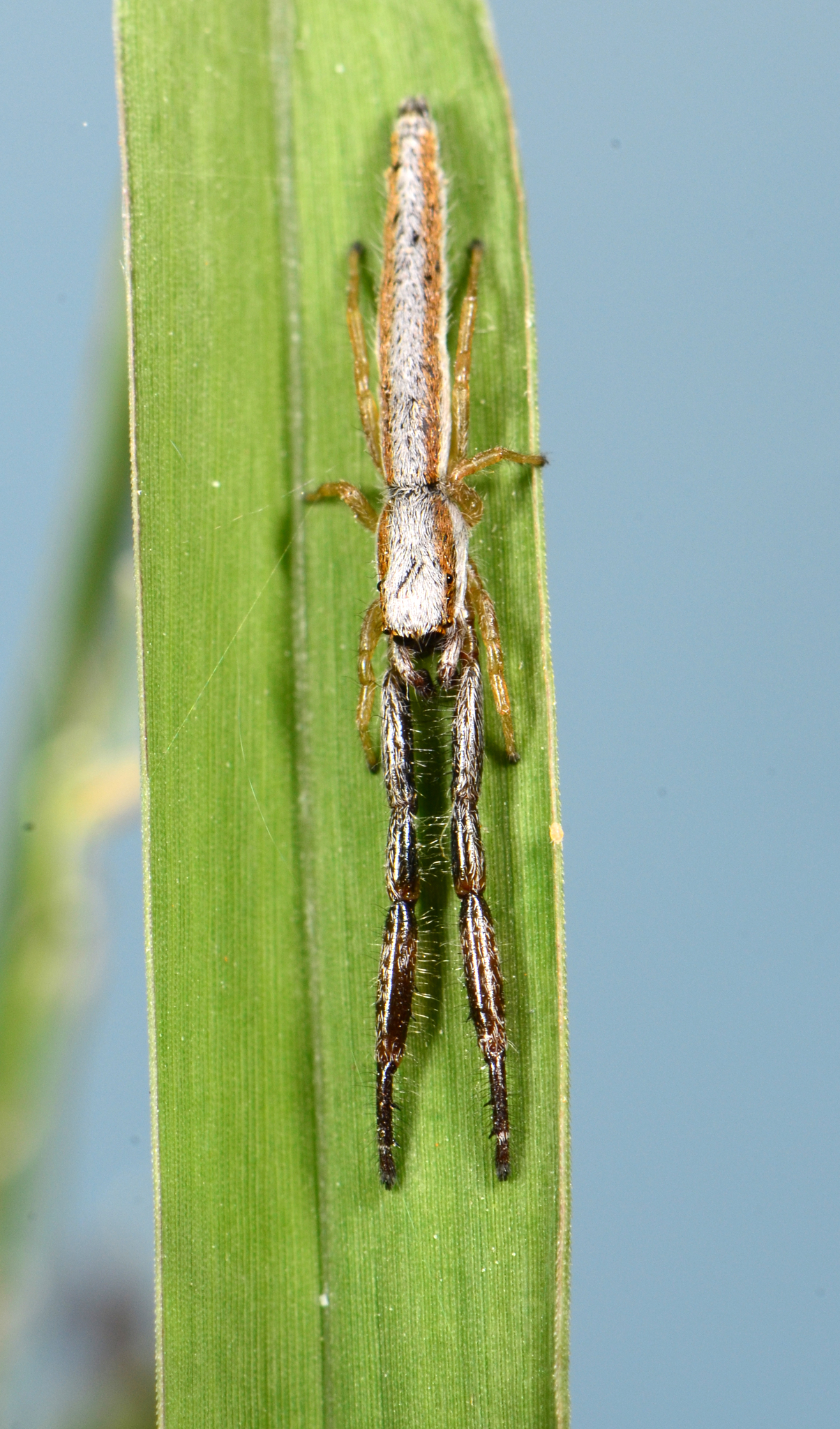
male F. leroyae

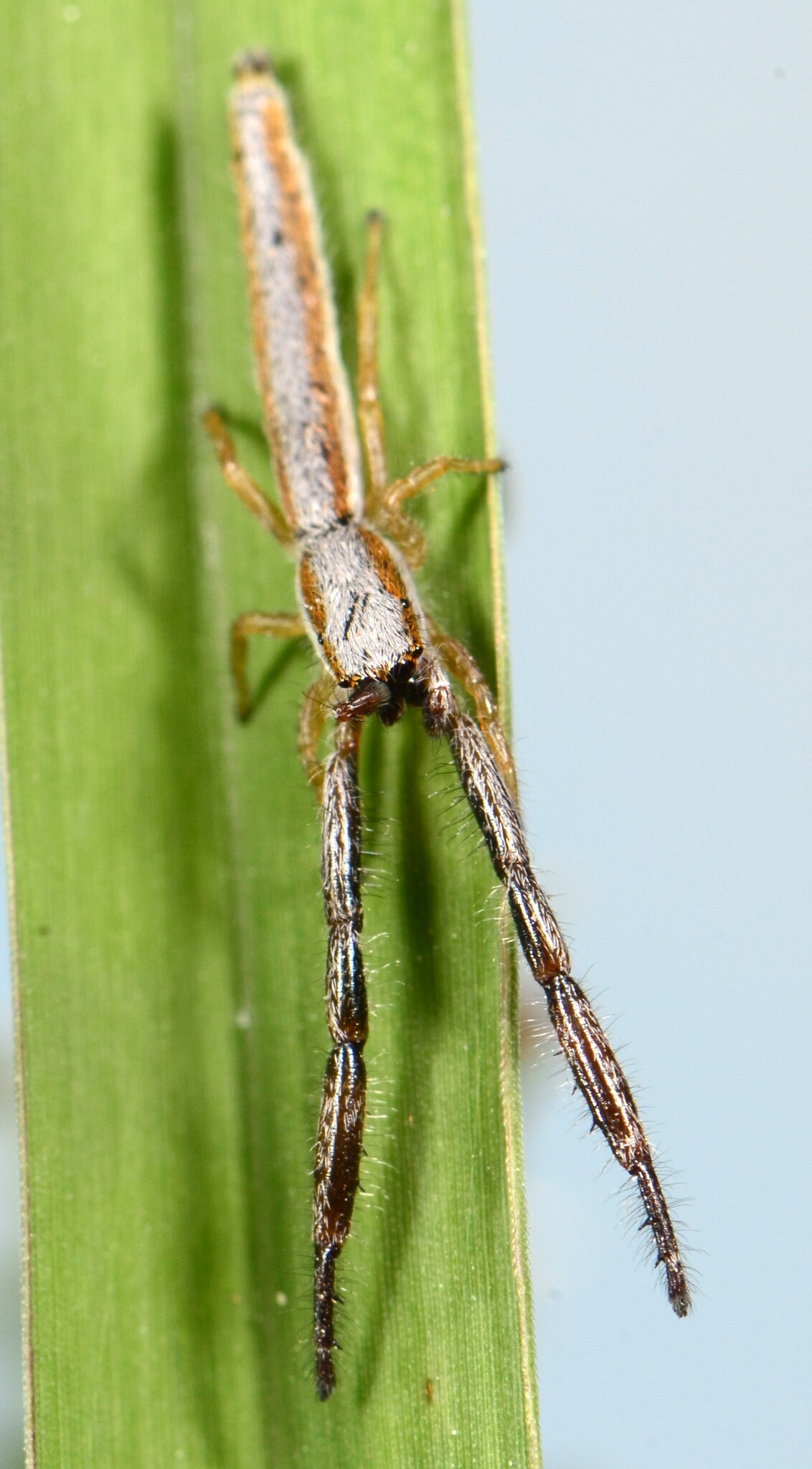
male F. leroyae

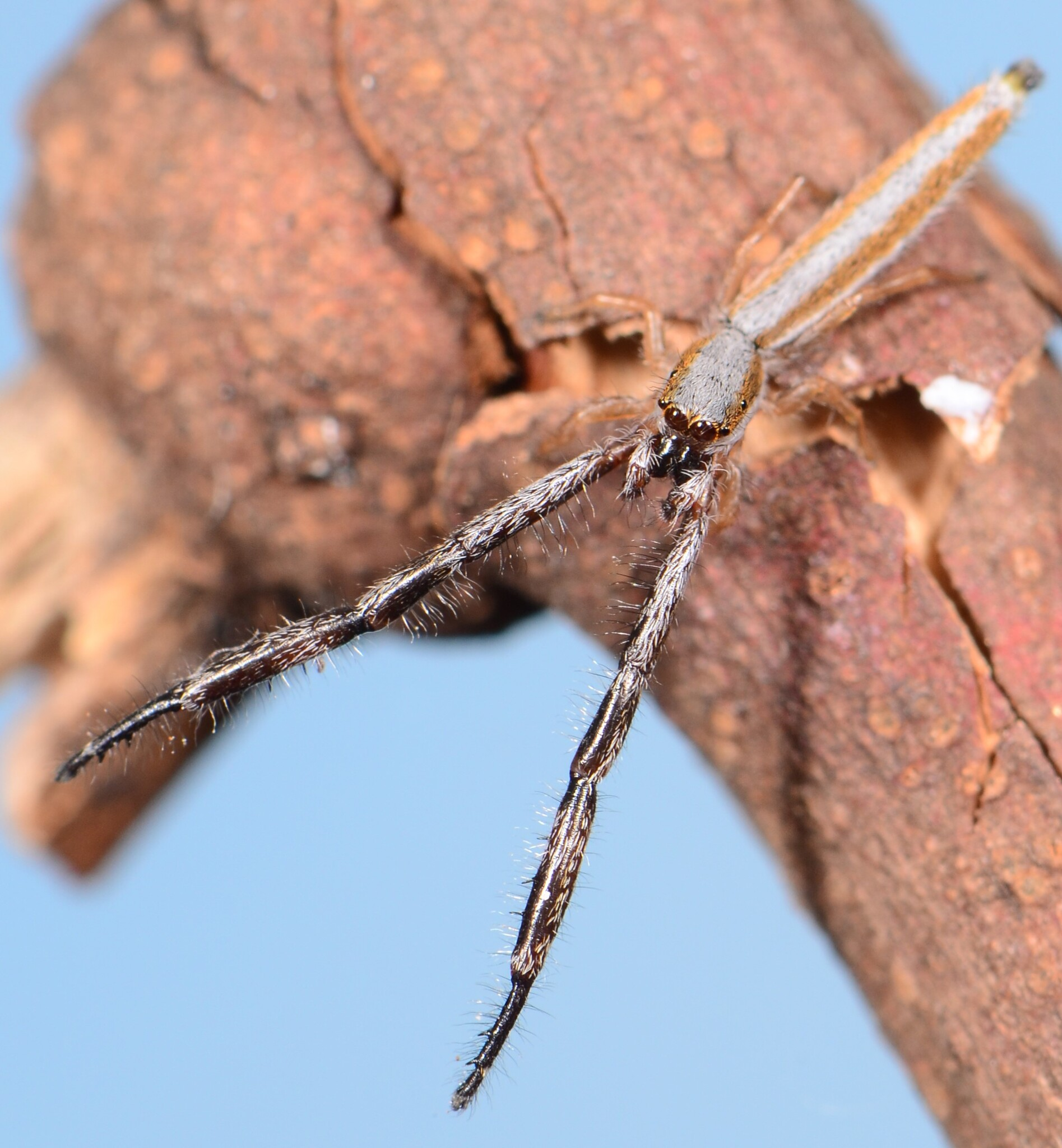
male F. leroyae

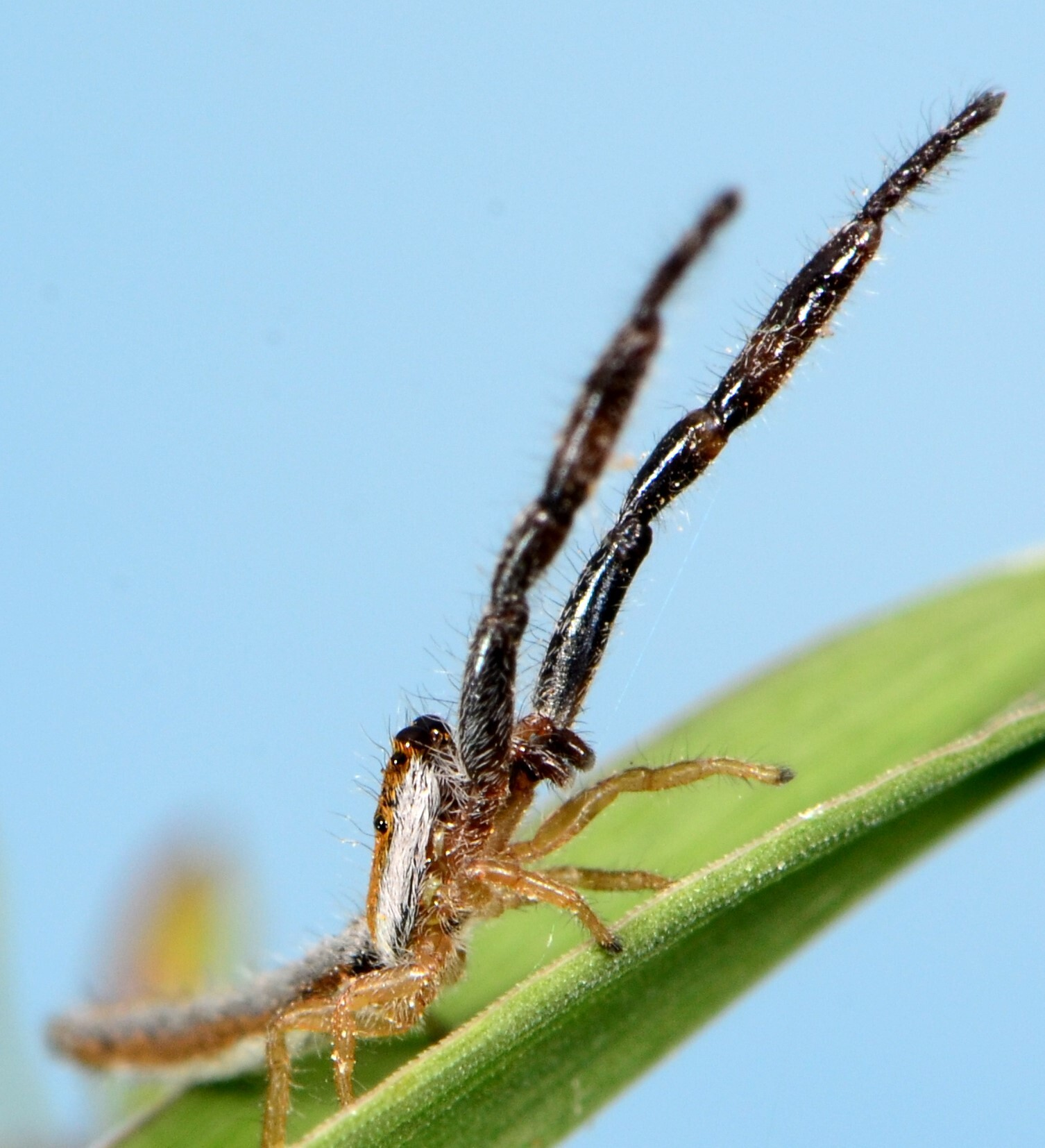
male F. leroyae

== Species ==
As of October 2025, this genus includes ten species:

- Festucula australis Lawrence, 1927 – DR Congo, Angola, Namibia, Mozambique
- Festucula botswana Azarkina & Foord, 2023 – Botswana
- Festucula festuculaeformis (Lessert, 1925) – Kenya, Tanzania
- Festucula haddadi Azarkina & Foord, 2014 – South Africa
- Festucula lawrencei Lessert, 1933 – Ghana, Angola, Botswana
- Festucula leroyae Azarkina & Foord, 2014 – Botswana, South Africa
- Festucula lineata Simon, 1901 – Senegal, Guinea, Ivory Coast, Ghana
- Festucula monticola Berland & Millot, 1941 – Guinea, Ghana, Nigeria
- Festucula robusta Azarkina & Foord, 2014 – South Africa
- Festucula vermiformis Simon, 1901 – Egypt, Sudan, Israel (type species)
