= Willem Pretorius Game Reserve =

South Africa game reserve

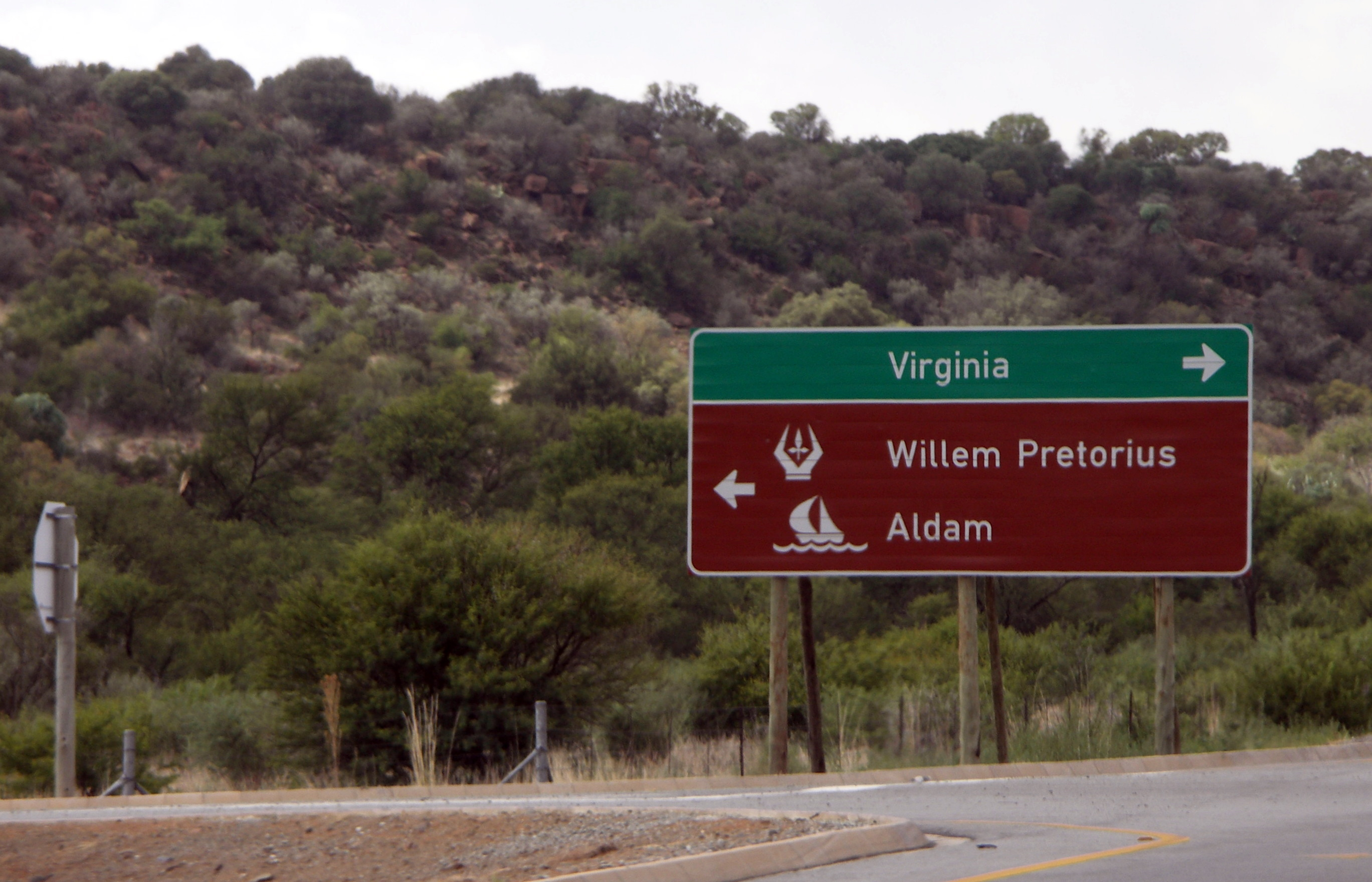
- Roadsign on the N1 national road directing to Willem Pretorius Game Reserve
- Map of the Free State
- Location: Lejweleputswa District Municipality, South Africa
- Coordinates: 28.306°S 27.236°E
- Area: 12,000 ha (30,000 acres)
- Established: 1961
- Willem Pretorius Game Reserve (South Africa) Willem Pretorius Game Reserve (Free State (South African province))

Willem Pretorius Game Reserve is the largest game reserve in the Lejweleputswa District Municipality of South Africa, encircling the Allemanskraal Dam. The Sand River flows from east to west through the reserve. It was opened to the public in 1961 and covers 12,000 hectares (30,000 acres).

== Climate ==
The reserve receives an annual rainfall of 560 mm on average, mostly falling from December to February during heavy thunderstorms. Frost occurs on 40 nights per year, the average temperature in the winter is 15° C and in the summer the mercury exceeds 30° C often.

=== Mammals in the reserve ===
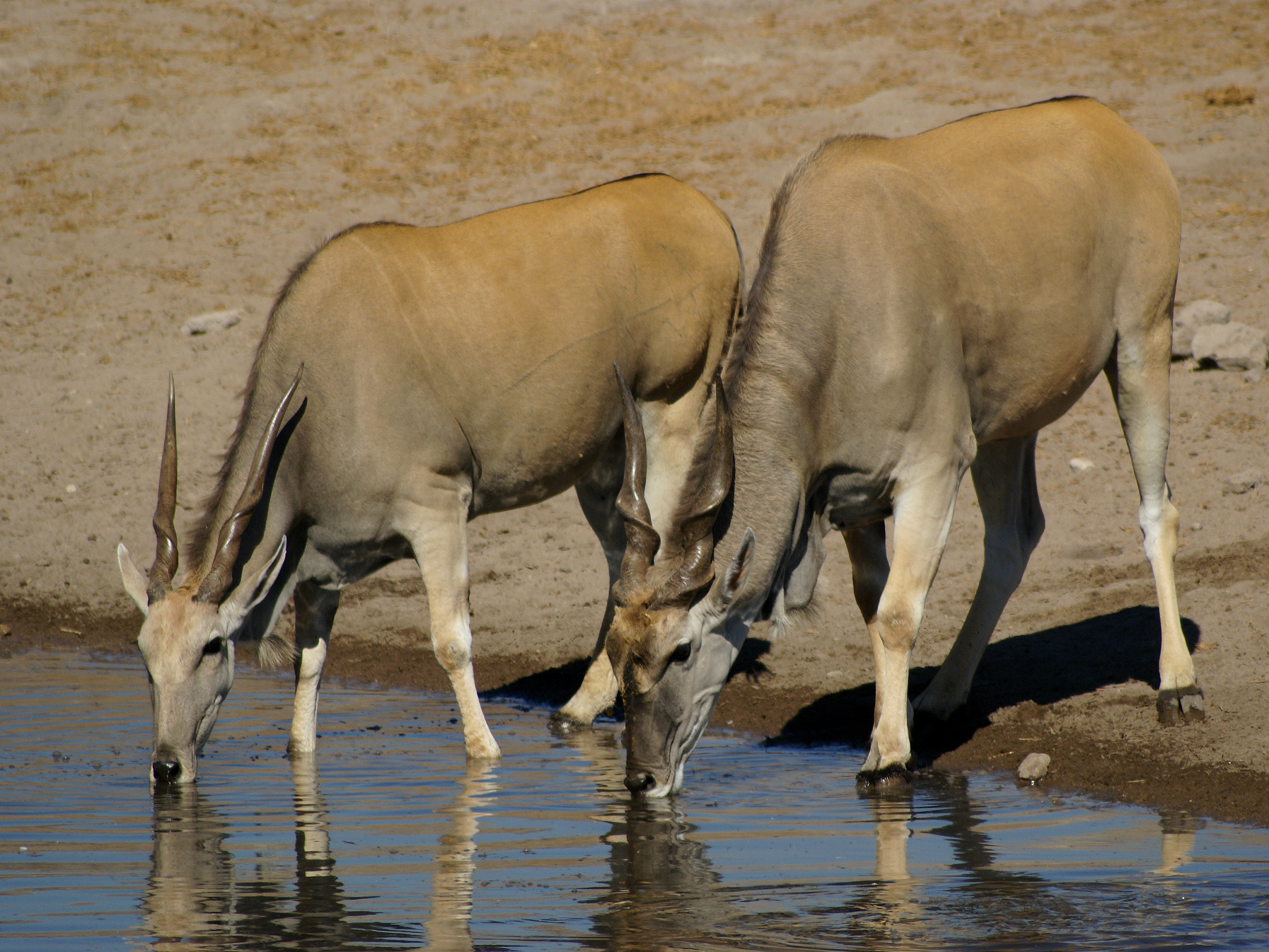
Eland

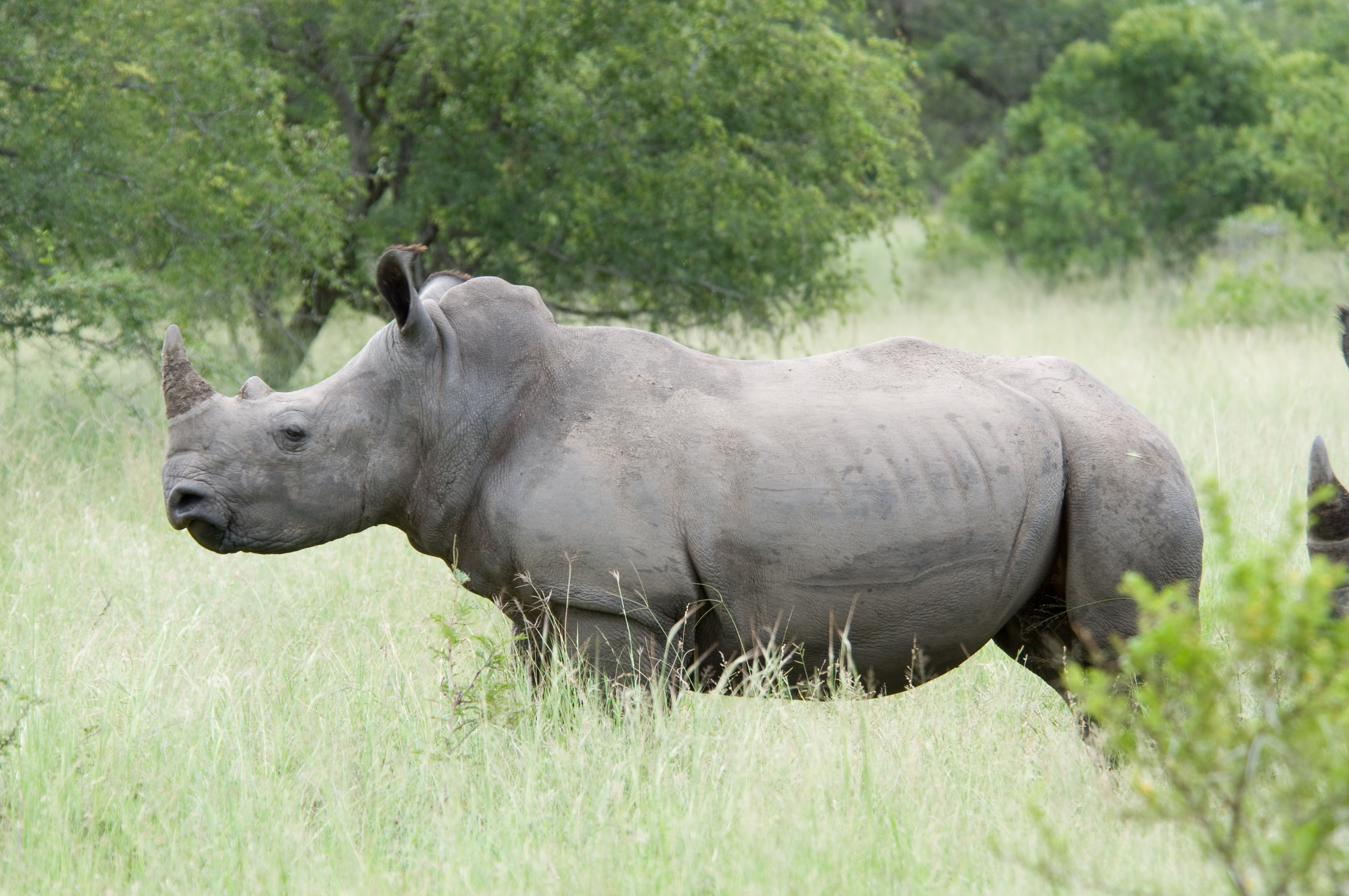
White rhinoceros

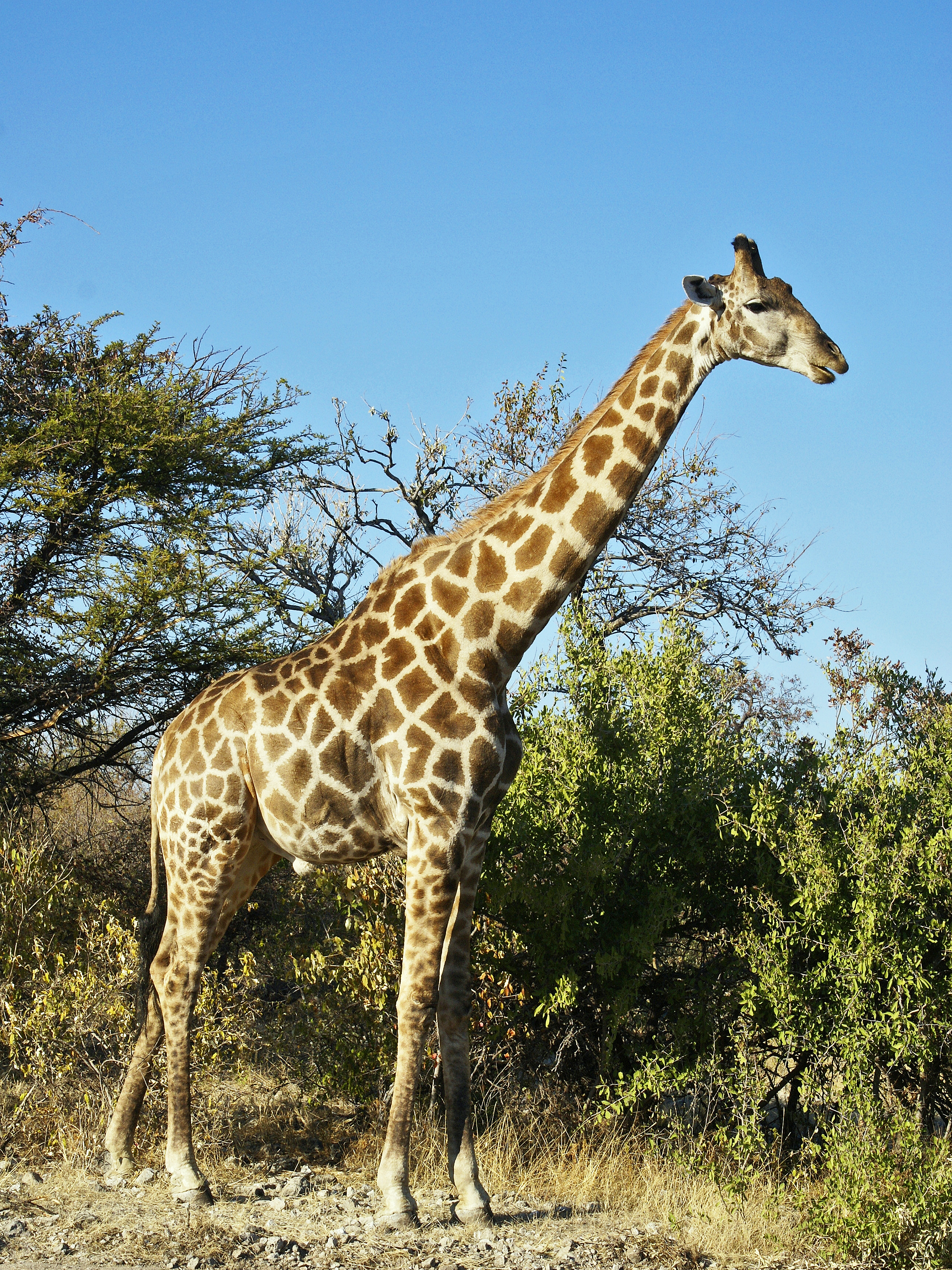
Giraffe

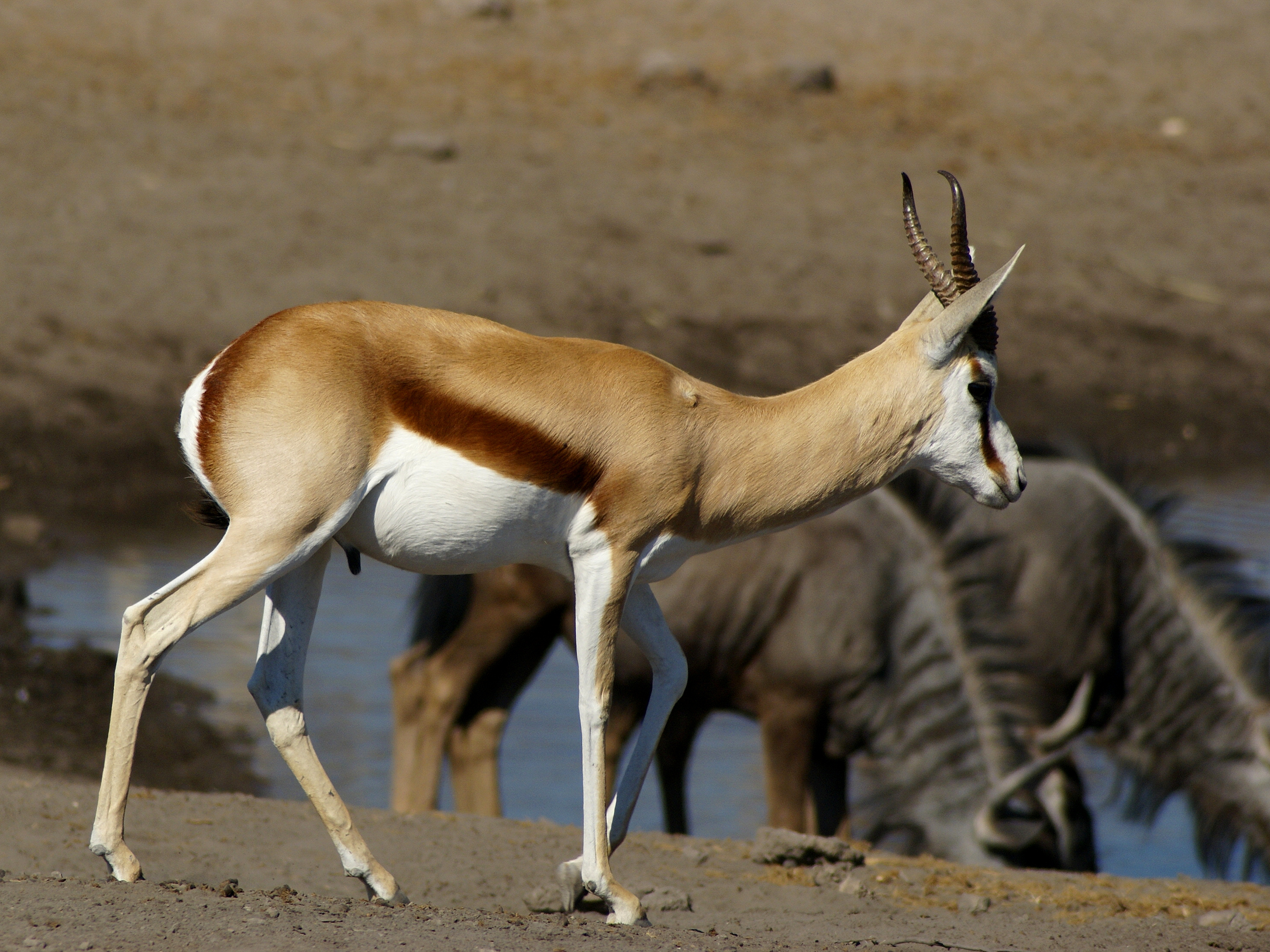
Springbok

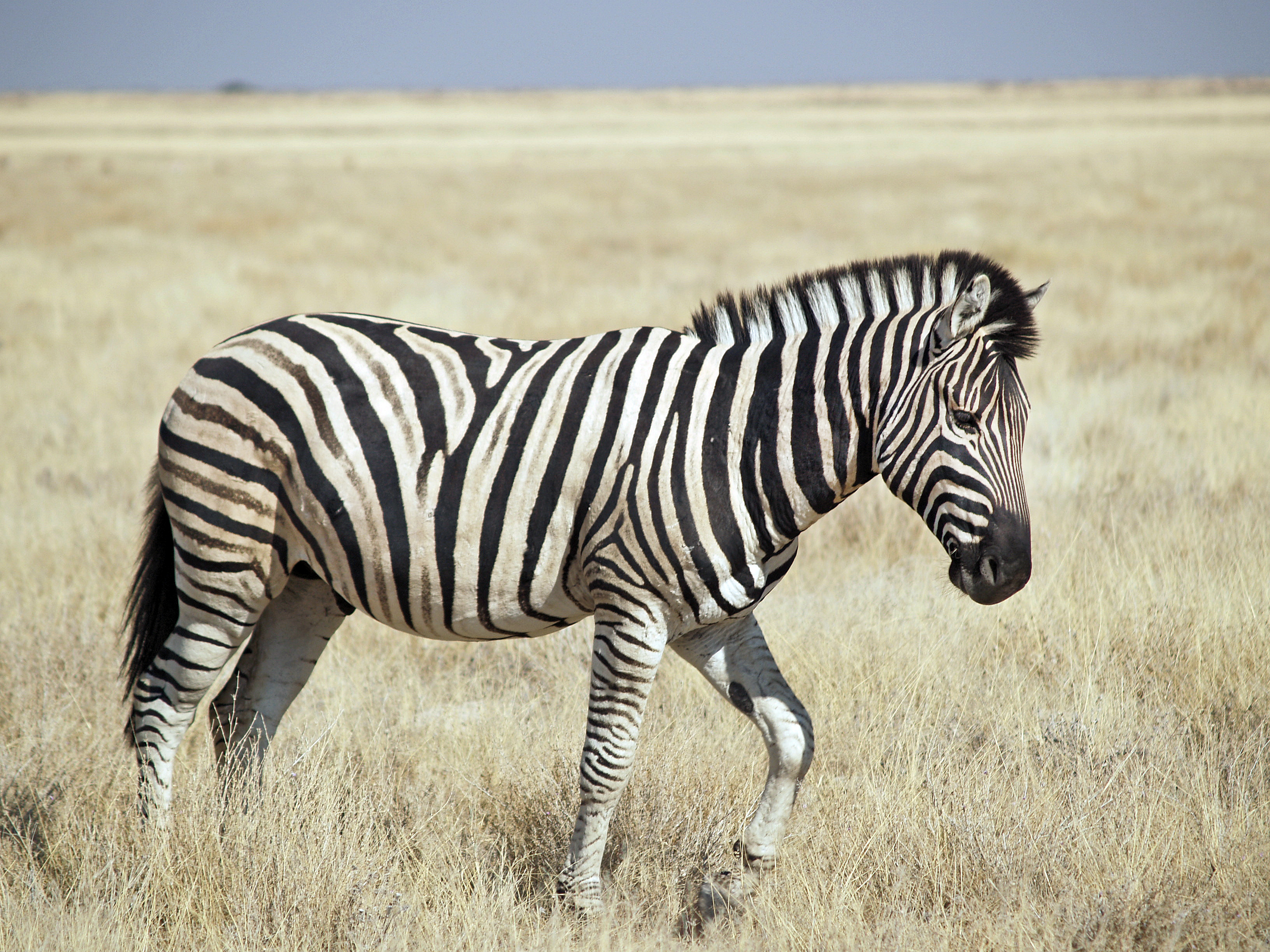
Burchell's Zebra

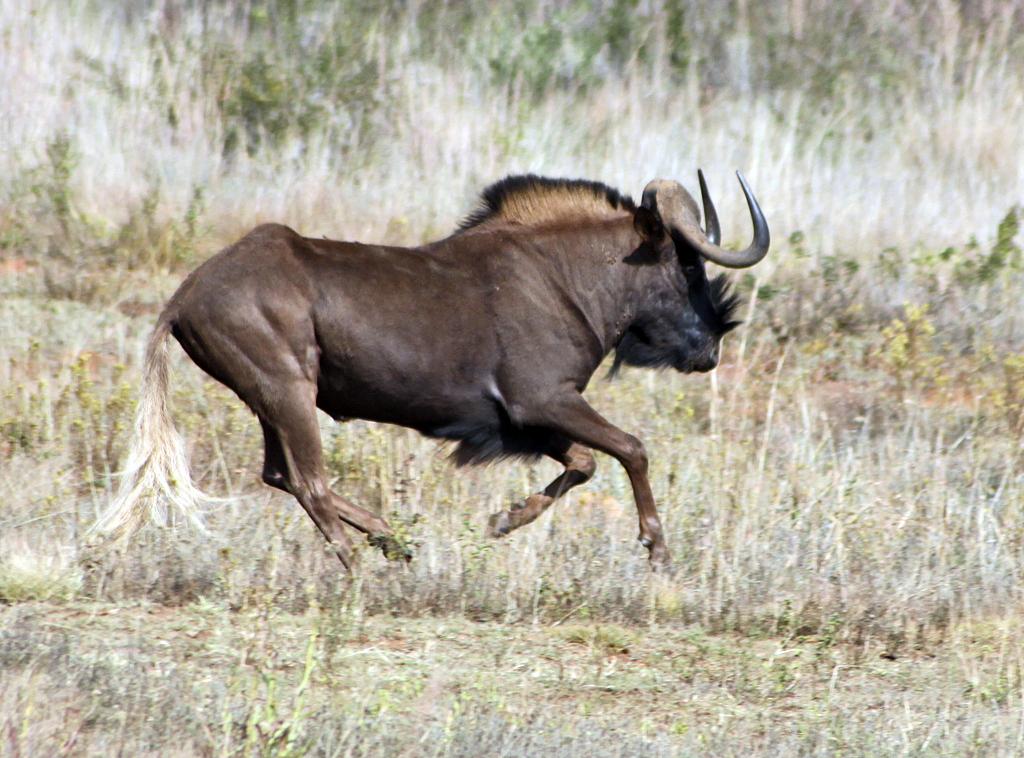
Black wildebeest.
