= Nooitgedacht Dam Nature Reserve =

- Interactive map of Nooitgedacht Dam Nature Reserve
- Location: near Carolina in Mpumalanga, South Africa
- Coordinates: 25.9767°S 30.0607°E

Nooitgedacht Dam Nature Reserve is a park near Carolina in Mpumalanga, South Africa, situated on the Komati River.

== See also ==
- Nooitgedacht Dam
