= Koppies =

Koppies Kopjes
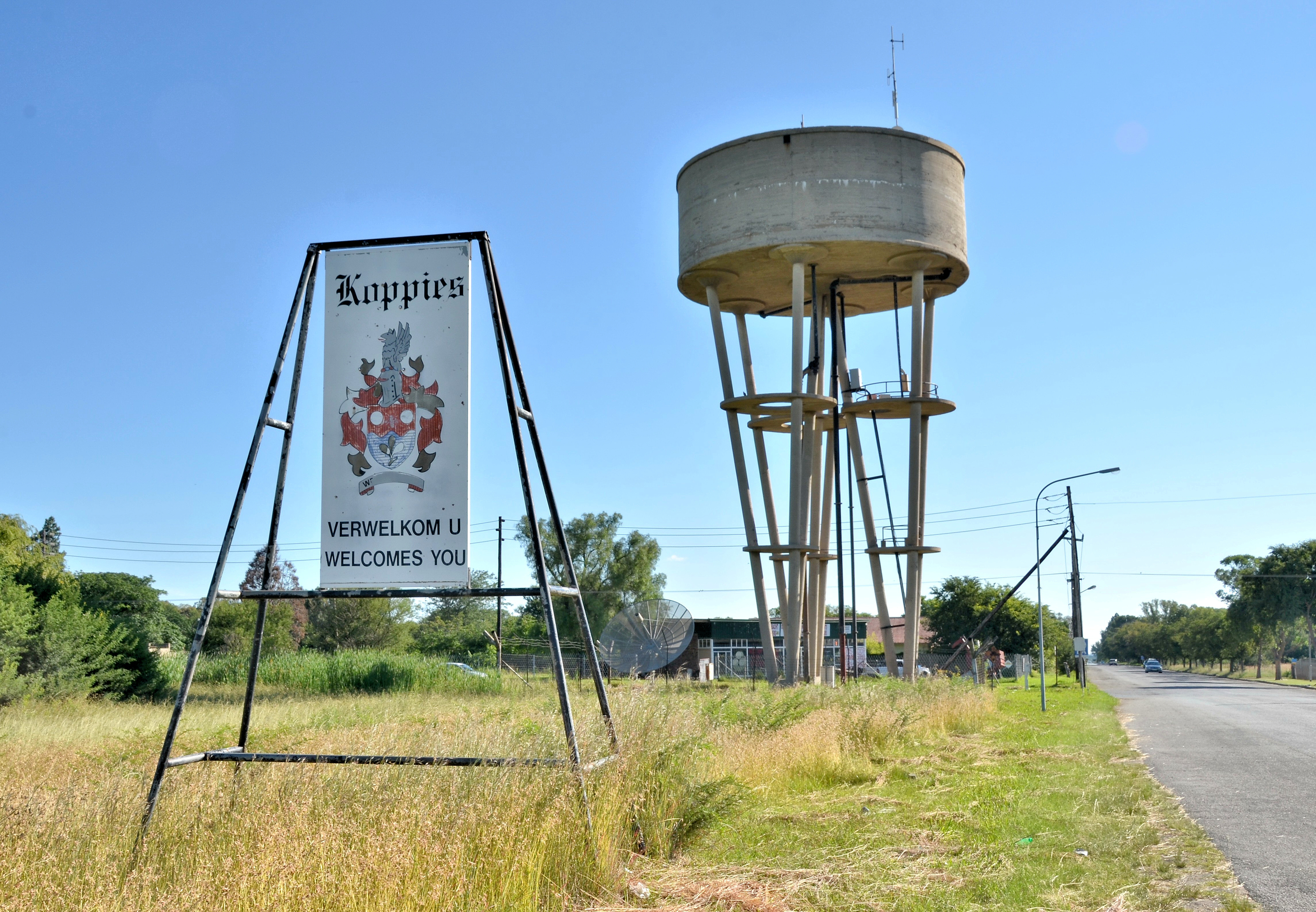
- Koppies entrance

- Location within Free State (South African province) Location within South Africa
- Coordinates: 27°14′S 27°35′E
- Country: South Africa
- Province: Free State
- District: Fezile Dabi
- Municipality: Ngwathe

Area
  - Total: 7.5 km^{2} (2.9 sq mi)

Population (2011)
  - Total: 13,803
  - Density: 1,800/km^{2} (4,800/sq mi)

Racial makeup (2011)
  - Black African: 94.9%
  - Coloured: 0.4%
  - Indian/Asian: 0.3%
  - White: 3.9%
  - Other: 0.4%

First languages (2011)
  - Sotho: 79.5%
  - Xhosa: 6.1%
  - Afrikaans: 4.9%
  - Zulu: 2.7%
  - Other: 6.7%
- Time zone: UTC+2 (SAST)
- Postal code (street): 9540
- PO box: 9540
- Area code: 056
- Website: www.koppies.info

Koppies is a small town (railway station) situated near the Renoster River in the Free State province of South Africa.

== Geography ==
The town is situated 63 km north-east of Kroonstad, 48 km west of Heilbron and 42 km south-south-east of Parys. It was laid out as a township in 1910 and became a municipality in 1926. Formerly Kopjes, meaning 'hills', the name is derived from that of the farm on which it was laid out, Honingkopjes, Dutch for 'honey hills'.

== History ==
General De Wet donated his Farm "Rooipoort" to be set up for under-privileged whites in the form of a few morgen irrigation land, and then a few morgen "dry" land for cultivating maize, etc. By the time the people got out of the war they were very poor, and were supplied with a few eggs and a paraffin lamp/hatcher for the eggs.

By demand/pressure of General De Wet, the Koppies Dam was constructed to supply water for irrigation, and work to the local people who needed it badly. During the 1960s, the wall of the dam was raised to where it is today.
