= Mooi River (Vaal) =

Mooi River Mooirivier
- Location of the Mooi River mouth
- Etymology: Mooirivier meaning 'pretty river' in Afrikaans

Location
- Country: South Africa
- State: North West
- City: Potchefstroom

Physical characteristics
- Source
  - location: SE of Koster
  - coordinates: 26°2′S 27°10′E
  - elevation: 1,550 m (5,090 ft)
- Mouth: Vaal River
  - location: E of Stilfontein
  - coordinates: 26°52′28″S 26°57′6″E
  - elevation: 1,305 m (4,281 ft)

The Mooi River (Afrikaans: Mooirivier) is a river in North West Province, South Africa. It is a tributary of the Vaal River and belongs to the Upper Vaal Water Management Area.

== Course ==
The Mooi rises near Koster and flows southwards. During its course it flows into the Klerkskraal Dam, Boskop Dam and the Potchefstroom Dam. After crossing the town of Potchefstroom it bends southwestwards, shortly bending westwards before it empties into the Vaal River near the border with the Free State, about 15 km east of Stilfontein.

Its main tributaries are the Wonderfonteinspruit (Mooirivierloop) and the Loop Spruit.

The waters of the Mooi River and its reservoirs are polluted with heavy metals in its mid and lower course because of the large gold and uranium mining operations in the basin.

== History ==
In November 1838 Voortrekker leader Andries Hendrik Potgieter and his followers established the first permanent European settlement north of the Vaal by the banks of the Mooi River, founding the town of Potchefstroom. The city was named in Potgieter's honor and was the capital of the former South African Republic until May 1860, when the capital moved to Pretoria.

The river and its main tributary the Wonderfonteinspruit were named by early settlers and owe their names to the abundance of karst springs that were found along their banks. Most popular ones include Klerkskraal eyes (still active) Bovenste Oog (still active), Oog van Gerhard Minnebron (still active), Boskop eye (status unknown), Turffontein eyes (still active), Oog van Wonderfonteinspruit (dry), Oberholzer Oog (dry), Bank eyes (dry) and Venterspos eye (dry).

Of these springs only Klerkskraal eye (which comprises one permanent spring and several perennial springs), Bovenste Oog and Oog van Gerhard Minnebron still flow. The status of Boskop eye is unknown as the area was flooded when Boskop dam was built making it very difficult to locate and observe.

The dry springs were a result of dewatering the aquifers that fed the eyes to make way for gold mining in the Far West Rand.

== Tributaries ==
There are 3 primary tributaries all joining from the east they are Wonderfonteinspruit, Loopspruit and Rooikraalspruit. There are several perennial streams and drainage canals along the banks.

Notable rivers and streams in the Mooi Rivers watershed include Wonderfonteinspruit, Loopspruit, Rooikraalspruit, Enselspruit, Taaiboschspruit, Leeuspruit, Tweeloopiespruit, Mooirivierloop and Spekspruit.

== Fauna ==
=== Fish ===
Fish species found in the river include Small mouth Yellowfish (Labeobarbus aeneus), Orange River Mudfish (Labeo capensis), Moggel (Labeo umbratus), Sharptooth Catfish (Clarias gariepinus), Banded Tilapia (Tilapia sparrmanii), Southern Mouthbrooder (Pseudocrenilabrus philander), Three spot Barb (Enteromius trimaculatus), Chubbyhead Barb (Enteromius anoplus), Straight-fin Barb ( Enteromius paludinosus), Western Mosquitofish (Gambusia affinis), Common Carp (Cyprinus carpio), Smallmouth Bass (Micropterus dolomieu), Swordtail (Xiphophorus hellerii), Largemouth Bass (Micropterus salmoides), Grass Carp (Ctenopharyngodon idella), Rock Catfish (Austroglanis sclateri), Canary Kurper Chetia flaviventris).

No known sightings of the Largemouth Yellowfish (Labeobarbus kimberleyensis) have been recorded in the last 40 years in the upper and middle Mooi River or its tributaries but there's a strong possibility that they do occur in the river close to its mouth on the Vaal river.

Mozambique Tilapia (Oreochromis mossambicus), Redbreast Tilapia (Coptodon rendalli), Blue (Israeli) Tilapia (Oreochromis aureus) and Nile Tilapia (Oreochromis niloticus) occur in the Wonderfonteinspruit up to where it disappears into the ground, but there are no known samples from the Mooi River itself.

=== Birds ===
The river and its surroundings harbour a rich bird population of over 250 recorded species including African Fish Eagle, Martial Eagle, Ostrich, Secretarybird, Greater and Lesser Flamingo, Grey Hornbill, Meyers Parrot, Kori Bustard, Giant Eagle Owl to name a few.

== Dams in the basin ==
The main dams in the Mooi River and its tributaries are Donaldson Dam, Klipdrift Dam, Klerkskraal Dam, Boskop Dam and Potchefstroom Dam

== See also ==
- List of rivers of South Africa
- List of reservoirs and dams in South Africa
- Vaal River
