= Kromelmboogspruit =

Tributary of the Vaal River

- Location of the Kromelmboogspruit mouth

Location
- Country: South Africa
- Province: Free State
- District: Ngwathe Local Municipality
- City: Parys

Physical characteristics
- Source
  - coordinates: 27.2215005°S 28.0356402°E
- Mouth: Vaal River
  - coordinates: 26.7862949°S 27.5375273°E
- Discharge
  - location: Vaal River

Kromelmboogspruit (Afrikaans for 'crooked elbow stream') is a tributary of the Vaal River in the Free State, which is part of the Orange River drainage basin. It is found near Heilbron and flows upwards in a north-westerly direction to drain into the Vaal between Parys and Sasolburg.

== Ecology and water quality ==
In a report from June 2021, SANBI found the Kromelmboogspruit to be in a "moderately modified ecological condition", and thus of high "ecological importance and sensitivity". The Ecosystem Protection Level and Ecosystem Threat Status is considered critical and poorly protected. In 2019 a surface water assessment was completed for Sasol, where Kromelmboogspruit was found to be within the limits set by the Water Use Licence, a mandatory license if a higher usage of water is required.

=== Fish species found at Kromelmboogspruit ===
- Labeobarbus aeneus
- Enteromius anoplus
- Enteromius pallidus
- Enteromius paludinosus
- Enteromius trimaculatus
- Clarias gariepinus
- Labeo capensis
- Labeo umbratus
- Tilapia sparrmanii
- Pseudocrenilabrus philander

=== Macroinvertebrate families found at Kromelmboogspruit ===
- Aeshnidae
- Ancylidae
- Baetidae (2 sp.)
- Belostomatidae
- Ceratopogonidae
- Chironomidae
- Coenagrionidae
- Corbiculidae
- Corixidae
- Culicidae
- Dytiscidae
- Elmidae
- Gerridae
- Gomphidae
- Gyrinidae
- Hydracarina
- Hirudinea
- Hydrometridae
- Hydrophilidae
- Hydropsychidae (2 sp.)
- Leptoceridae
- Leptophlebidae
- Libellulidae
- Lymnaeidae
- Muscidae
- Naucoridae
- Notonectidae
- Oligochaeta
- Physidae
- Planorbinae
- Pleidae
- Potamonautidae
- Simuliidae
- Sphaeridae
- Tabanidae
- Tipulidae
- Turbellaria
- Veliidae/Mesoveliidae

== See also ==
- List of rivers of South Africa
