= Donaldson Dam =

Dam

Donaldson Dam is a dam next to the Bekkersdal township in South Africa along the Wonderfonteinspruit. It comprises 2 reservoirs - the Top lake and the Bottom lake. Its water has been heavily polluted by acid mine runoff on the upper Wonderfonteinspruit and sewage from nearby Bekkersdal.

Despite the water quality concerns the dams remain popular fishing destinations amongst Carp anglers, the upper lake is one of the most renowned syndicate specimen angling destinations in South Africa.

== Specimen Angling ==
=== Top Lake ===
The top lake is known alternatively as African Gold Syndicate Lake amongst specimen anglers and is situated on private property, bookings need to be made in order to fish there and syndicate members get preference over general public. The dam is known for monster carp, it's not unusual to catch fish around 25 kg. The top lakes record is 27.1 kg caught in 2016.

=== Bottom Lake ===
The bottom lake was a once-popular holiday destination, popular amongst families looking to spend the day out at the water, today the facilities are neglected and run down. The dam is now run by the government and is kept neat and relatively maintained. The dam is also popular amongst specimen anglers as well as conventional anglers and bass anglers alike. The bottom lake is government run so it is open to all public without preference to syndicate members unlike the top lake. Common Carp (Cyprinus carpio) varieties caught at the dam include mirror carp, leather carp, ghost carp, Israeli carp and koi, other species available at the dam include Sharptooth Catfish (Clarias gariepinus), Moggel (Labeo umbratus), Orange River Mudfish (Labeo capensis), Banded Tilapia (Tilapia sparrmanii), Southern Mouthbrooder (Pseudocrenilabrus philander), Threespot Barb (Enteromius trimaculatus), Straightfin Barb ( Enteromius paludinosus), Largemouth Bass (Micropterus salmoides) and Western Mosquitofish (Gumbisa Affinis).

Bottom Lake Records
Species	Common name	Size	Year
Cyprinus Carpio	Common Carp	28.3 kg	1991
Clarias Gariepinus	Sharptooth Catfish	20.2 kg	1994
Micropterus Salmoides	Largemouth Bass	3.8 kg	2017
