= Boskop Dam =

- Interactive map of Boskop Dam
- Official name: Boskop Dam
- Country: South Africa
- Location: Near Potchefstroom
- Coordinates: 26°32′45″S 27°7′10″E
- Purpose: Irrigation and domestic
- Opening date: 1959
- Owner: Department of Water Affairs

Dam and spillways
- Type of dam: Earth fill dam
- Impounds: Mooi River
- Height: 18 m
- Length: 1320 m

Reservoir
- Creates: Boskop Dam Reservoir
- Total capacity: 20 850 000 m³
- Surface area: 373 ha
- Maximum water depth: 14m
- Website; Department of Water Affairs - Boskop Dam

Boskop Dam is an earth-fill type dam on the Mooi River, near Potchefstroom, North West Province, South Africa. It was constructed in 1959. The main purpose of the dam is for irrigation and domestic usage. Its hazard potential is ranked as high, due to poor maintenance and the development of sink holes.

The Boskop Dam Nature Reserve has been established on 3 000 hectare around the dam's reservoir.

== Fauna ==
Game viewing and birdwatching are also popular attractions. The dam and its surroundings harbour a rich bird population of over 250 recorded species, and the reserve's wildlife includes black wildebeest, springbuck, red hartebeest, zebra and blesbok. Other animals that can be seen around the dam include Cape Clawless Otter, Honey Badger, Yellow and Slender Mongoose, Striped Polecat, Black backed Jackal, Cape and Bat-eared Fox, Brown Hyena, Warthog, African Wild Cat, Porcupine, Aardvark, Aardwolf, Cape Pangolin, Cape and Scrub Hare, Caracal, Nile and Rock Monitor Lizards and African Bullfrog.

=== Fish Species ===
According to the last fish mark-recapture study at Boskop the Orange river Mudfish (Labeo Capensis) & Moggel (Labeo Umbratus) made up 95% of the total fish population in the dam, Sharptooth Catfish (Clarias Gariepinus), Common Carp (Cyprinus Carpio), Small-mouthed Yellowfish (Labeobarbus Aeneus), Largemouth Bass (Micropterus Dolomieu) and Banded Tilapia (Tilapia Sparrmanii) were all recorded in that study which was done almost 50 years ago, since then the following discoveries were made - Southern Mouthbrooder (Pseudocrenilabrus philander), Three Spot Barb (Enteromius trimaculatus), Goldie Barb (Enteromius pallidus), Chubbyhead Barb (Enteromius anoplus), Straight-fin Barb (Enteromius paludinosus), Smallmouth Bass (Micropterus salmoides), Grass Carp (Ctenopharyngodon idella), Rock Catfish (Austroglanis sclateri), Canary Kurper (Chetia flaviventris) and Western Mosquitofish (Gumbisa Affinis).

There were reports of Largemouth Yellowfish (Labeobarbus kimberleyensis) in the Mooi River before the dam was built, as well as in the reservoir after the dam was built, but no known sightings of the fish have been recorded in the last 40 years in the upper and middle Mooi River or its tributaries, it's believed the building of dams and the introduction of invasive fish (Largemouth and Smallmouth Bass compete directly with the Largemouth Yellowfish as the apex predators).

Recently unconfirmed reports of Mozambique Tilapia (Oreochromis mossambicus), Redbreast Tilapia (Tilapia rendalli) and Nile Tilapia (Oreochromis niloticus) have been reported. The 3 species are found in the Wonderfonteinspruit, which is a tributary of the Mooi River, just before it reaches Boskop dam, but the Wonderfonteinspruit disappears into the ground some 7 km from its routes confluence, only to rise again some 2 km from the river beds confluence at Oog van GerhardMinnebron and forms a new confluence with the Mooi River 3.3 km away, making it unlikely the 3 species could be transferred between the two systems.

== Flora ==
The nature reserve side has thick reed beds along its bank, The littoral zone around the lake is mostly covered with an aquatic weed Potamogeton pectinatus. This weed invaded 50% of the total surface area of the lake in 1975, and this percentage has remained more or less constant. The nature reserve side also has a small Bluegum (eucalyptus spp.) plantation on the Department of Water Affairs grounds close to the wall. The reserve has natural grassland endemic to the highveld region.

== Uses ==
=== Angling ===
The reservoir is a popular Bass fishing destination in the region. Bank fishing is limited due to limited space thanks to reeds (phragmites spp.) growing along the bank of the dam.

FISH RECORDS FROM THE DAM
SPECIES	COMMON NAME	SIZE	YEAR
Clarias gariepinus	Sharptooth Catfish	36.3 kg	1994
Cyprinus carpio	Common Carp	16.4 kg	1997
Labeobarbus aeneus	Smallmouth Yellowfish	6.2 kg	1990
Ctenopharyngodon idella	Grass Carp	33.1 kg	2012
Micropterus Dolomieu	Largemouth Bass	6.3 kg	2007
Micropterus salmoides	Smallmouth Bass	2.7 kg	2013

=== Water Sports ===
The Boskop Yacht Club is situated on the south-west side of the dam. The dam is also a popular canoeing destination.

Tanglewood Nature Estate www.tanglewoodnatureestate.com is situated on the Eastern side of the Boskop dam. This private resort is open to all especially those fishing from boats, kayaks and other water craft.

=== Water ===
The reservoir is the primary source of drinking water for Potchefstroom. It also provides surrounding farm lands with irrigation water via a canal.

=== Tourism ===
There is two popular resorts on the southern side of the dam that provide camping amenities and recreational facilities for holiday goers. The nature reserve also allows camping over night and fishing within its grounds.

== See also ==
- List of reservoirs and dams in South Africa
- List of rivers of South Africa
