= Upper Vaal Water Management Area =

Upper Vaal WMA, or Upper Vaal Water Management Area (coded: 8), is a Water Management Area that includes the following major rivers: the Wilge River, Liebenbergsvlei River, Mooi River and Vaal River, and covers the following Dams:

- Boskop Dam - Mooi River
- Grootdraai Dam - Vaal River
- Klerkskraal Dam - Mooi River
- Klipdrift Dam - Loop Spruit
- Potchefstroom Dam - Mooi River
- Saulspoort Dam - Liebenbergsvlei River
- Sterkfontein Dam - Nuwejaar Spruit
- Vaal Dam - Vaal River

== Boundaries ==
Tertiary drainage regions C11 to C13, C21 to C23, and C81 to C83.
