= Wonderfonteinspruit =

River in South Africa

Coordinates: 26.2547°S 27.7182°E

The Wonderfonteinspruit is a small river situated in the Highveld region of South Africa. Its source has been disputed in the past, although it is now accepted that the river originates in the West Rand of Gauteng between Krugersdorp and Randfontein, at the Tudor Dam, which was initially used as a storage dam for the Luiperdsvlei Gold Plant. In the past the river received a majority of its water from karst springs along its course. The river flows through one of the richest gold-producing areas in the world, which led to the dolomitic compartments which fed the river being dewatered to make way for mining activities. This led to the drying up of the karst springs that fed the river.

== Naming ==
The river owes its name to the number of karst springs observed along its course by the early settlers in the area. Emil Holub wrote about the pristine beauty of the area along the river and its magnificent karst features. These include the river disappearing into the ground and reappearing kilometers downstream, as well as isolated deep crystal clear pools up to 150 feet (46 m) deep with no apparent inlet or outlet within the vicinity of the river. Hence the name Wonderfonteinspruit (wonder-fountain-stream).

== Course ==
The river's natural source is unknown. Its current source is at Tudor Dam, which gets its water from underground pumping and urban runoff. The dam is heavily criticised for heavy metals and water pollution. From there the river flows into Lancaster Dam, which was once a popular recreational destination before being drained due to pollution. The river flows westward from there through the township of Kagiso until it reaches Donaldson Dam just outside the township of Bekkersdal. Just after Donaldson Dam, the river flows into a 1 metre (3.3 ft) diameter pipeline which transports it over the dewatered dolomitic compartments to just outside Carletonville. There it forms a large wetland area known as Abe Bailey Wetlands, part of Abe Bailey Nature Reserve and Abe Bailey Dam (Padda Dam). After Abe Bailey Dam's wall it flows as a stream to the Welverdiend Wetland. From there the river flows into three more private farm dams before it 'disappears' and resurfaces at the two Turffontein eyes. It continues from there for its last 10 kilometres (6.2 mi) until its convergence with the Mooi River.

== Impoundments ==
The river currently has six impoundments along its course, which include Donaldson Dam's top and bottom lakes, Abe Bailey Dam and three small farm dams west of Welverdiend. There are also three decommissioned dams - Tudor Dam, Lancaster Dam and Harry's Dam. These dams were deemed unsafe for public use due to acid mine runoff and waterborne radioactive materials, including uranium. Previously, the dams had been utilized for recreation (Tudor and Lancaster Dams) and for living (e.g. fishing for food, drinking water for cattle and irrigation). Harry's Dam also leaked water into the dewatered compartments, causing problems for the mining companies responsible for the dewatering.

== Wetlands ==
Wetlands in the area include Kagiso Wetland, Abe Bailey Wetland and Welverdiend Wetland.

== Fauna ==
=== Birds ===
At least 250 different bird species have been spotted in and around the river. There is a wide variety of habitats along the river course including wetlands, impoundments, grassland, scrubland, riverine forest, thornveldt, rocky outcrops and both rural and urban settlements. Some notable birds include:

- the African fish eagle,
- martial eagle,
- black-chested snake eagle,
- secretarybird,
- kori bustard,
- Egyptian goose and
- Meyer's parrot.

=== Mammals ===
Large game such as black wildebeest, Burchell's zebra, blesbok and springbok are limited to the nature reserves and private game farms bordering the river. Other antelope such as the common duiker, steenbok, grey rhebok and klipspringer are found in their natural habitat along the river, as well as:

- warthogs,
- vervet monkeys,
- rock hyrax,
- Cape and scrub hares,
- springhares,
- porcupines,
- aardvarks,
- pangolins,
- hedgehogs,
- ground squirrels,
- yellow and slender mongooses,
- striped weasels,
- striped polecats,
- large spotted and small spotted genets,
- honey badgers,
- aardwolf,
- black-backed jackals,
- Cape foxes,
- African wildcats,
- caracals,
- Cape clawless otters and
- leopards,

as well as various other small rodents, feral animals and livestock.

=== Reptiles/Amphibians ===
Large leopard tortoises can still be found near the river, a rare sight for such endangered species. Large African rock pythons 5.5–6 metres (18–20 ft) have frequently been seen along with rinkhals, boomslang, and other snakes. Lizards such as the rock monitor lizard, flap-necked chameleon, Transvaal girdled lizard and various skinks and geckos live in the area.

African bullfrogs, tree frogs, common caco, and various toads are among the amphibians inhabiting the river.

== Fish species ==
The following fish can be found along the entire course of the river:

- common carp,
- sharptooth catfish,
- banded tilapia,
- southern mouthbrooder,
- threespot barb,
- straightfin barb,
- largemouth bass,
- orange river mudfish,
- moggel, and
- western mosquitofish.

The Wondefonteinspruit below the 1m pipeline has additional fish species, including:

- Mozambique tilapia,
- redbreast tilapia,
- Nile tilapia,
- canary kurper,
- blue (Israeli) tilapia,
- chubbyhead barb,
- perch, and
- goldfish.

There are also oreochromis and tilapia hybrids in the river, due to fish stocking in settling ponds and golf course dams belonging to the mine, and the unsuccessful attempt at starting a fishery by a farmer, who later released his stock into the canal adjoining the settling ponds to the Wonderfonteinspruit.

== See also ==
- List of rivers of South Africa
