= Tlokwe Local Municipality =

Tlokwe
- Local municipality
- Seal

- Location in the North West
- Coordinates: 26°45′S 27°10′E
- Country: South Africa
- Province: North West
- District: Dr Kenneth Kaunda
- Seat: Potchefstroom
- Wards: 26

Government
  - Type: Municipal council
  - Mayor: Kgotso Khumalo (ANC)

Area
  - Total: 2,674 km^{2} (1,032 sq mi)

Population (2011)
  - Total: 162,762
  - Density: 60.87/km^{2} (157.6/sq mi)

Racial makeup (2011)
  - Black African: 71.3%
  - Coloured: 6.8%
  - Indian/Asian: 0.9%
  - White: 20.6%

First languages (2011)
  - Tswana: 40.6%
  - Afrikaans: 27.5%
  - Sotho: 11.9%
  - Xhosa: 9.6%
  - Other: 10.4%
- Time zone: UTC+2 (SAST)
- Municipal code: NW402

Tlokwe Local Municipality (before February 2007, Potchefstroom Local Municipality) was a local municipality in Dr Kenneth Kaunda District Municipality, North West Province, South Africa. The seat was Potchefstroom. After the municipal elections on 3 August 2016 it was merged into the larger JB Marks Local Municipality.

The most widely accepted theory on the origin of the name Potchefstroom is that the name is composed of three words: Potgieter, chef and stroom. The first syllable is that of Potgieter, the second from the fact that he was a "chef" or a leader of the emigrants, and the third signifying the Mooi River. The complete name "Potgieter" was gradually shortened to "Pot".

== In The News ==
In February 2013, then mayor of Tlokwe, prof. Annette Combrink declared that she would refuse to use the new official vehicle that was delivered to her. It was a customized Mercedes-Benz C350 CDI, worth R736,000.-, that the ANC ruled council had ordered in July 2012 for the previous mayor Maphetle Maphetle. Combrink represents the opposition Democratic Alliance but was elected mayor due to disagreements in the ANC led council. She declared to be quite happy to use her nine-year-old Volkswagen Passat instead, in view of the poverty in the municipality. The ANC declared that they plan to unseat the mayor as soon as possible.

== Main places ==
The 2001 census divided the municipality into the following main places:

Place	Code	Area (km^{2})	Population	Most spoken language
Ikageng	61801	76.64	61,847	Tswana
Mohadin	61802	2.75	12,079	Tswana
Potchefstroom	61803	46.19	26,723	Afrikaans
Promosa	61804	2.88	10,715	Afrikaans
Remainder of the municipality	61805	2,544.91	16,983	Afrikaans

== Rivers ==
- Ensel Spruit
- Kromdraai Spruit
- Loop Spruit
- Mooi River
- Rooikraal Spruit
- Vaal River

== Dams ==
- Boskop Dam
- Klipdrift Dam
- Modder Dam
- Poortjies Dam
- Potchefstroom Dam

== Politics ==
The municipal council consisted of fifty-two members elected by mixed-member proportional representation. Twenty-six councillors were elected by first-past-the-post voting in twenty-six wards, while the remaining twenty-six were chosen from party lists so that the total number of party representatives was proportional to the number of votes received. In the election of 18 May 2011 the African National Congress (ANC) won a majority of thirty seats in the council. The following table shows the results of the election.

Party	Votes				Seats		
Party	Ward	List	Total	%	Ward	List	Total
ANC	28,480	32,544	61,024	57.9	16	14	30
DA	19,710	19,326	39,036	37.0	9	10	19
VF+	1,508	1,374	2,882	2.7	0	2	2
COPE	978	759	1,737	1.6	1	0	1
ACDP	319	168	487	0.5	0	0	0
Independent Ratepayers Association of SA	236	54	290	0.3	0	0	0
Total	51,231	54,225	105,456	100.0	26	26	52
Spoilt votes	2,323	660	2,983				

Mayor Maphetle Maphetle of the African National Congress was dismissed in late 2012 after a motion of no confidence passed, and Annette Combrink of the opposition Democratic Alliance was elected mayor. Three months later a motion of no confidence removed Combrink, and Maphetle was reinstated. Since then, municipal-council and mayoral elections have been keenly contested.
