= Gerhardminnebron =

Natural spring off Ventersdorp, South Africa

Coordinates: 26°28′47″S 27°09′06″E

Gerhardminnebron is a natural karst spring located a few kilometers east of Ventersdorp in South Africa and draining into the Mooi River, which in turn flows into the Vaal River. It yields some 60 000 – 80 000 cubic meters of water per day, and is affected by exploitation and pollution by the gold mining industry in the region, deep–level gold mining having markedly impacted on the dolomitic aquifers. This spring is located in dolomitic rock that is part of the larger Boskop–Turffontein dolomite compartment in the Transvaal Basin. Dolomite is a sedimentary carbonate rock, a swath of which runs parallel to the Magaliesberg, and has a tendency to form large underground lakes and reservoirs.

Potchefstroom is one of the largest towns in the area and was established in 1838. Water from the spring is used for the domestic needs of Potchefstroom, and is also utilised by local farmers. The farm on which the spring is located was known to the Voortrekkers and was first occupied by a certain Gerhard Breytenbach, also in 1838. Emil Holub travelled through the region in 1873, and later described the natural springs he encountered in his book 'Sieben Jahre in Süd Africa' published in 1881. He also remarked on the funnel-shaped sinkholes he came across.

Sammy Marks, the pioneer industrialist of the Transvaal, bought the farm in the 1890s and constructed an irrigation canal to supply water for his crops. The contractor who built the canal was Pieter Bezuidenhout, who had in 1880 refused to hand over his wagon in lieu of unpaid taxes levied by the British authorities - this action led to the First Boer War.

== Environmental issues ==
The strong discharge of groundwater from the spring has created an area of peatland or karst fen. The vast majority of peat is located in the high-rainfall regions of the northern hemisphere and its occurrence in South Africa is rare. The spring is fed by water issuing from a system of interlinked dolomitic aquifers or compartments. Four of the nine compartments which feed the Wonderfonteinspruit are affected by deep level gold mining. Large-scale pumping of water has led to a lowering of the groundwater table by up to 1000 metres, the trapping of uranium-bearing tailings in caves and sinkholes, the discharge of pollutants into the Wonderfonteinspruit, and seepage from tailings into the aquifer beneath.
