= Melvill Cup =

The Melvill Cup is the badminton team competition for South Africa provinces. The cup was first held in 1950. Later on title competitions for B and AC teams were added alongside the highest-A level teams.

== Champions ==
Season	Section A	Section B	Section AC
1950	Northern Transvaal	not played	
1951	not played	not played	
1952	Southern Transvaal	not played	
1953	not played	not played	
1954	Western Province	not played	
1955	Northern Transvaal	not played	
1956	Northern Transvaal	not played	
1957	Western Province	not played	
1958	Western Province	not played	
1959	Western Province	not played	
1960	Western Province	not played	
1961	Southern Transvaal	not played	
1962	Southern Transvaal	not played	
1963	Southern Transvaal	not played	
1964	Southern Transvaal	not played	
1965	Southern Transvaal	not played	
1966	Southern Transvaal	not played	
1967	Southern Transvaal	not played	
1968	Southern Transvaal	BOL	not played
1969	Southern Transvaal	OFS	not played
1970	Southern Transvaal	OFS	not played
1971	Southern Transvaal	Eastern Province	not played
1972	Southern Transvaal	Vaal	not played
1973	Southern Transvaal	Vaal & Border	SAU
1974	Southern Transvaal	Border	SAU
1975	Southern Transvaal & Natal	Vaal & Eastern Province	SAU
1976	Natal	Vaal	Namibia
1977	Southern Transvaal	OFS	SACD
1978	Southern Transvaal	Eastern Province	GW
1979	Southern Transvaal	SAU	OFS
1980	Southern Transvaal & Western Province	Eastern Province	Vaal
1981	Southern Transvaal	GW	South East Transvaal
1982	Western Province	South East Transvaal	Western Transvaal
1983	Western Province & Northern Transvaal	GW	Border
1984	Western Province	Eastern Province	BOL
1985	Western Province & Southern Transvaal	Border	Vaal
1986	Western Province	Eastern Province	OFS
1987	Southern Transvaal	GW	SAU
1988	Western Province	GW	Namibia & Western Transvaal & SACD
1989	Western Province	Vaal	SACD
1990	Western Province	Eauyfc stern Province	OFS
1991	Western Province	ETVL	SACD
1992	Western Province	OFS	Western Transvaal
1993	Southern Transvaal	Eastern Province	Vaal
1994	Southern Transvaal	Border	Vaal
1995	Natal	Vaal	SANDF
1996			
1997			
1998			
1999			
2000	EBA	Free State	GW
2001	Western Province	SACD	North Western Province
2002	KwaZulu-Natal	NG	SAVIK
2003	Western Province	Free State	
2004	Western Province & Free State		
2005	FC	Border	
2006	Western Province	Western Province	Sedibeng
2007	Western Province	Easterns	NG B
2008	Western Province	NC	Border
2009	Western Province	Southerns	-
2010; 2015	no data		
