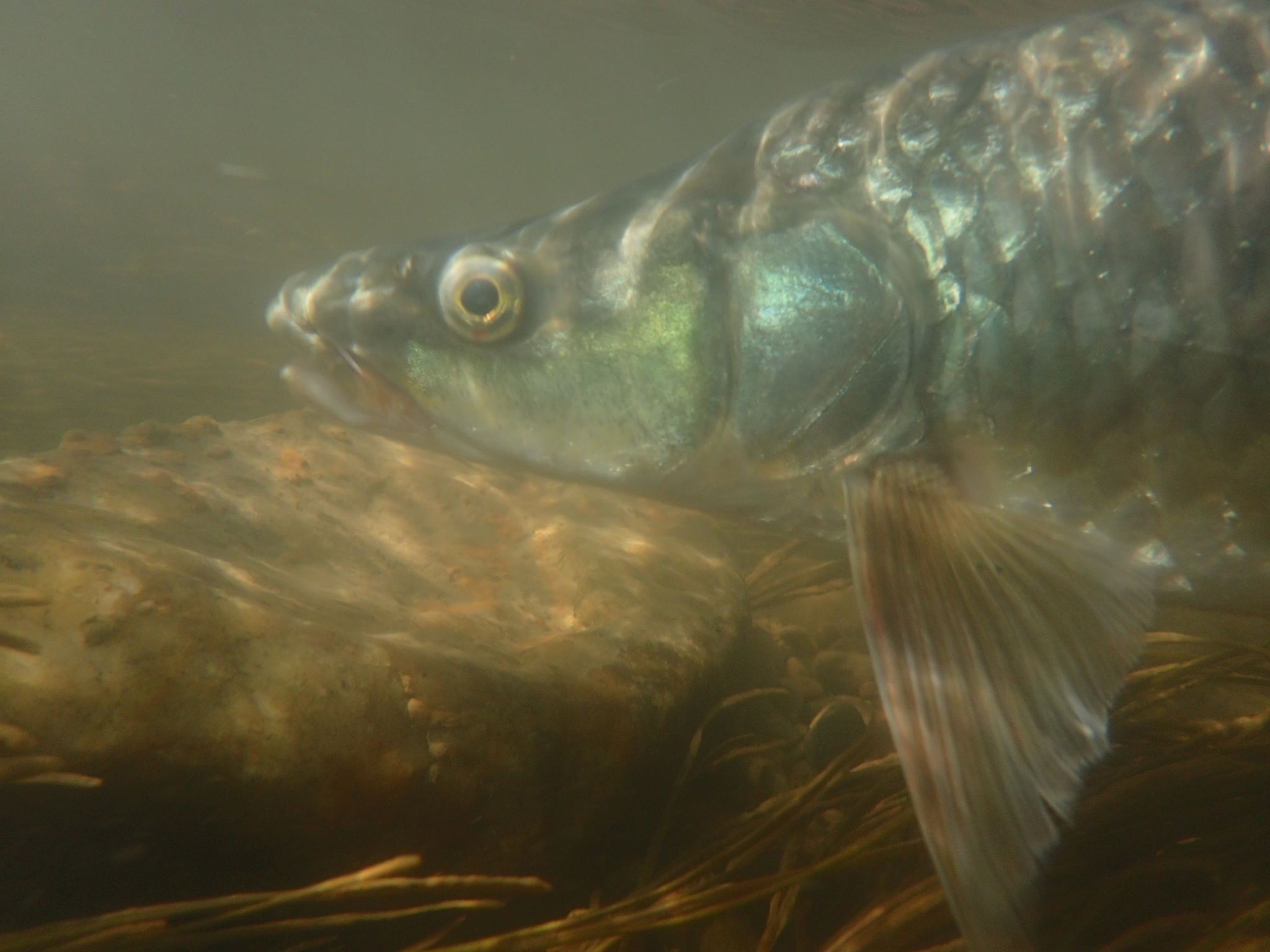

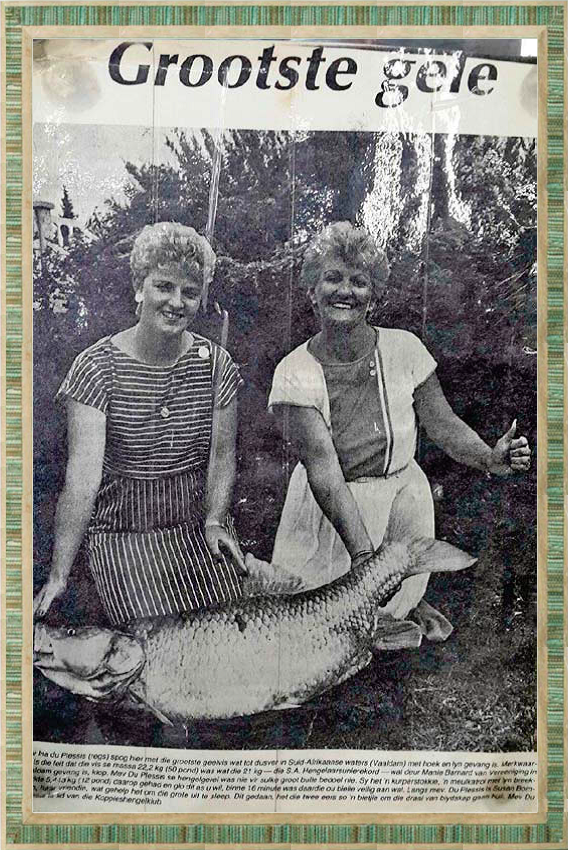
- Photo of the official South African Largemouth yellowfish open record of 22.2 kg, that was caught in Vaal Dam during an angling club competition.

Conservation status
- Near Threatened (IUCN 3.1)

Scientific classification
- Kingdom: Animalia
- Phylum: Chordata
- Class: Actinopterygii
- Order: Cypriniformes
- Family: Cyprinidae
- Subfamily: Torinae
- Genus: Labeobarbus
- Species: L. kimberleyensis

Binomial name
- Labeobarbus kimberleyensis (Gilchrist & W. W. Thompson, 1913)
- IUCN range (2016) Extant (resident) Probably extant (resident)

Synonyms
- Barbus kimberleyensis Gilchrist & Thompson, 1913; Barbus pienaarti Fitzsimons, 1949

= Largemouth yellowfish =

Species of fish

The largemouth yellowfish or Vaal-Orange largemouth yellowfish (Labeobarbus kimberleyensis) is a ray-finned fish species in the family Cyprinidae. This large freshwater barb is found in southern Africa. It is listed as a near threatened species.

== Record Catch on Feeder Rod ==
Dr. Shahed Nosarka, a South African national angler, holds the record for the largest largemouth yellowfish caught on a feeder rod using light tackle. His record-breaking catch weighed 6.13 kg and was achieved at Vaal Dam, a well-known location for freshwater angling.

Nosarka's record is particularly notable as it was achieved using feeder fishing techniques, which require precision, skill, and finesse due to the light tackle used. His achievement has been officially recognized within the South African angling community and has been featured in publications such as The Bank Angler Magazine and on various angling platforms.

His expertise in competitive fishing, particularly in feeder angling, has earned him multiple selections for the South African Protea Team and a bronze medal at the 2023 Method Feeder World Championships.

== Taxonomy ==
It has long been placed in Barbus, the "wastebin genus" for barbs, by default; however, the species is increasingly being restored to related yellowfish genus Labeobarbus which seems a much more appropriate placement. It is probably hexaploid like the other yellowfish. L. kimberleyensis shares mtDNA haplotypes with the sympatric smallmouth yellowfish (L. aeneus), but is morphologically distinct. This typically indicates either species that have recently diverged, or hybrid introgression, or morphs that are mistakenly considered distinct species. The latter does not seem likely in this case, as the two differ much in size alone, but the actual cause for the genetic similarity remains unstudied.

== Distribution ==
The largemouth yellowfish occurs in the Orange and Vaal Rivers and their larger tributaries (e.g. the Riet River) in Lesotho, Namibia and South Africa. In the latter country, it is found in Eastern Cape Province, Free State, Gauteng, Mpumalanga, North-West Province and Northern Cape Province.

== Ecology ==
L. kimberleyensis is predominantly found in deep pools (deeper than 2 metres/yards) of large rivers, as well as in the slow-moving water before weirs and river dams (e.g., Sterkfontein Dam). Abundant water weeds, overhanging riparian vegetation and other forms of plant cover seem to be essential for its well-being. These fish are predators of aquatic large and small invertebrates, with adults feed almost exclusively on other fish. Spawning occurs in riffles during the summer season (around December/January), with a large female able to lay more than 60,000 eggs in a single spawning season. They are relatively slow-growing and long-lived fish, reaching a total length of 30 cm (12 in) only after five years.

== Conservation status ==
Compared to some of its relatives, the stocks of the largemouth yellowfish are still relatively healthy and it is not considered a threatened species. It is listed as Near Threatened by the IUCN though, as many ecosystems in which it occurs are severely degraded, and if this does not change, it probably cannot maintain viable populations for long.

In the lower Orange River, considerable numbers are still found. Damming may cut off local populations from spawning sites. The Vaal River is highly laden with pollutants from sewage outside the wet season, and fish kills have been reported due to this. As it is an apex predator, its population density cannot be high. It is popular with anglers and theoretically a valuable food species, but it is recommended to catch and release it until the water quality is improved – for one thing, catching them for food may deplete local stocks to the point of extinction. For another, as an apex predator it accumulates toxins and may not be safe to eat. Whether significant introgression with the smallmouth yellowfish (Labeobarbus aeneus) occurs and yields less viable hybrid offspring (which would also serve to decrease its stocks) needs to be determined.

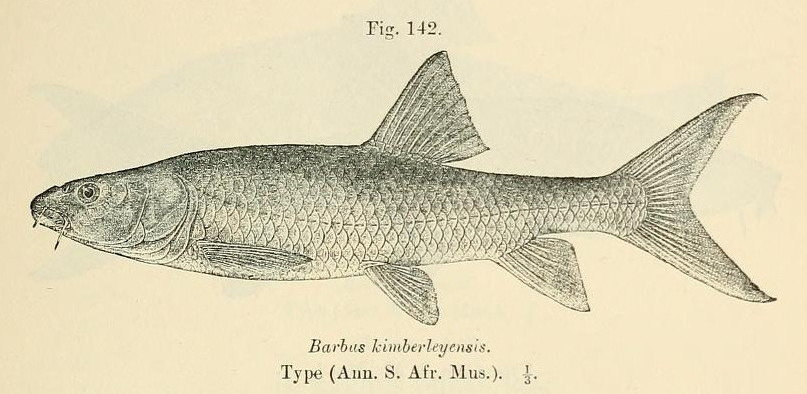

L. kimberleyensis is found in the Augrabies Falls and Richtersveld National Parks. Anglers are being educated about this flagship species and encouraged to practice catch and release, which is mandatory in Free State. The species has also been successfully transplanted to dams within its range that have nearby shallow-water regions for spawning.
