= Enteromius pleurogramma =

Conservation status
- Data Deficient (IUCN 3.1)

Scientific classification
- Kingdom: Animalia
- Phylum: Chordata
- Class: Actinopterygii
- Order: Cypriniformes
- Family: Cyprinidae
- Subfamily: Smiliogastrinae
- Genus: Enteromius
- Species: E. pleurogramma

Binomial name
- Enteromius pleurogramma Boulenger, 1902

Synonyms
- Barbus pleurogramma

Species of fish

Enteromius pleurogramma is a species of ray-finned fish in the genus Enteromius. It is endemic to Ethiopia, from the basin of the Blue Nile including Lake Tana.

Some authors include it in the straightfin barb (E. paludinosus). But while they are certainly extremely closely related, they appear to be distinct cryptic species.
