= Vaal Barrage =

- Official name: Vaal Barrage
- Country: South Africa
- Location: Border Gauteng & Free State
- Coordinates: 26°45′53″S 27°41′03″E
- Opening date: 1923
- Owner(s): Rand Water

Dam and spillways
- Type of dam: Barrage
- Impounds: Vaal River
- Height: 10 metres (33 ft)
- Length: 329 metres (1,079 ft)

Reservoir
- Creates: Vaal Barrage Reservoir
- Total capacity: 56,712,000 cubic metres (2.0028×10^{9} cu ft)
- Catchment area: 1,349 hectares (3,330 acres)

The Vaal River Barrage Reservoir is a dam on the Vaal River near Vanderbijlpark, border Gauteng and Free State, South Africa.

The Barrage, created by a set of gates across the Vaal River, was built by Rand Water downstream of the Vaal Dam, in 1923. The reservoir is 64 kilometres long and has a total storage capacity of 63 million litres, a surface area of 16,835 square kilometres and has an average depth of 4,5 metres. The rivers – i.e., Suikerbosrand, Klip, & Rietspruit – that feed into the Vaal River Barrage Reservoir flow from industrial and heavily populated areas such as Johannesburg, Vereeniging and Sasolburg. This reservoir was used to supply water to the Witwatersrand but no longer does so because the quality of its water is deteriorating due to pollution. This reservoir, which is managed by Rand Water, is used for many recreational activities, such as boating, skiing, fishing, and swimming, with many holiday resorts found along its banks.

== See also ==
- List of reservoirs and dams in South Africa
- List of rivers of South Africa
