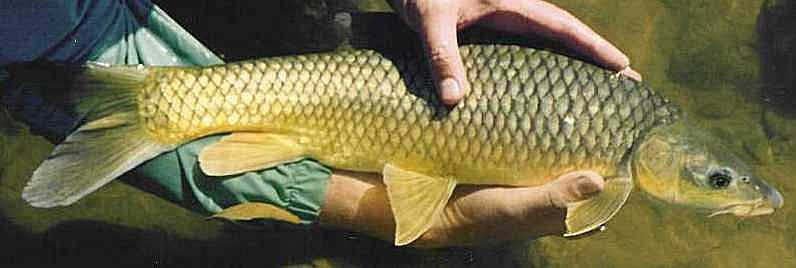

Conservation status
- Least Concern (IUCN 3.1)

Scientific classification
- Kingdom: Animalia
- Phylum: Chordata
- Class: Actinopterygii
- Division: Teleostei
- Order: Cypriniformes
- Family: Cyprinidae
- Genus: Labeobarbus
- Species: L. aeneus

Binomial name
- Labeobarbus aeneus (Burchell, 1822)

Synonyms
- Cyprinus aeneus Burchell, 1822; Barbus aeneus (Burchell, 1822); Barbus holubi Steindachner, 1894; Barbus gilchristi Boulenger, 1911; Barbus mentalis Gilchrist & Thompson, 1913

= Smallmouth yellowfish =

Species of fish

The smallmouth yellowfish (Labeobarbus aeneus) is a species of ray-finned fish in the genus Labeobarbus. It has become an invasive species in rivers of the Eastern Cape, South Africa, such as the Mbhashe River.

== Introduction ==
The Orange-Vaal River system is one of the few in South Africa that is truly international. The source of the Orange river is in Lesotho and that of the Vaal on the Mpumalanga highveld whereas their tributaries extend well into most provinces of South Africa as well as into Botswana and Namibia. The Orange river eventually flows into the Atlantic Ocean at Oranjemund on the West coast border between South Africa and Namibia. The river drains hugely diverse terrestrial habitat types ranging from grasslands, mountains and karoo to desert. This results in diverse riverine habitats that include clear mountain streams, turbid waters of the middle Orange river and the nutrient-rich discoloured water of the lower reaches of both rivers. Several in stream dams have changed the natural flow of the upper reaches to a regulated flow in the middle and lower reaches. This river system is home to South Africa's best known and favourite sport yellowfish, the Orange-Vaal smallmouth yellowfish, L. aeneus.

== Biology and ecology ==
The smallmouth yellowfish is a hardy and adaptable species that is widespread across its natural distribution range. It has the ability to inhabit smaller streams owing to its smaller size. Attaining a mass of around 9 kg it is an opportunistic feeder, eating a variety of food types ranging from plant material to aquatic insects, crabs, shrimps and small fish.

The smallmouth yellowfish is a slow-growing species with a low egg-to-mass ratio (fecundity), only becoming sexually active at a fork length of 30 cm when it is almost seven years old. During the spawning season the skin of the male fish is covered in sensory papillae, giving it a rough feel to the touch. This is also found in females but to a lesser extent, therefore always wet your hands before handling fish as dry hands can remove this critical mucous layer that protects the skin and scales.

When water temperatures exceed 19 °C in Spring, small shoals of fish migrate to shallow rocky areas to spawn and may do so intermittently from October to February. The long spawning season is an adaptation to the food-driven river and ensures that yellowfish will be able to lay eggs whenever favourable conditions occur. The eggs are relatively large and have a double "shell", allowing the fish to spawn in rough rapids and riffles.

The fast water is highly oxygenated and a highly productive zone for algae, diatoms and aquatic insect larvae and nymphs. The juvenile fish have silver bellies and a characteristic olive-green back with black spots. They gather in small shoals in favourable habitat.

=== Distribution ===
The Orange-Vaal river system, also translocated to Gouritz, Great Fish and Kei river systems as well as the Limpopo river and Kyle dam in Zimbabwe.

=== Habitat ===
Prefers clear flowing waters of large rivers with sandy or rocky substrates. Also thrives in large impoundments.

=== Diet ===
Larger fishes are omnivores depending on availability of food with benthic invertebrates, incl. bivalve molluscs, vegetation, algae and detritus.

== Status ==
The smallmouth yellowfish is listed as "Not Threatened", as it is still widespread across the Orange-Vaal River system and is in abundance in most suitable habitats. However, recent fish kills in the middle Vaal river and some tributaries are a cause for concern, as they have the potential to cause substantial damage to valuable recreational fisheries.

== Threats ==
Water pollution in the form of effluent from municipal sewerage plants, agriculture and mine water return flows perhaps pose the most serious threat to yellowfish in the middle to lower Vaal river and several of its tributaries. Whereas most of the ingredients of the effluent are not directly toxic to fish, the enriched water facilitates algal blooms that reduce dissolved oxygen concentration to lethal levels. (see NCYWG ongoing research report).

Additionally, bacteria that break down organic waste produce by products such as ammonia and nitrites. At elevated levels these nitrogenous wastes are highly toxic to fish and even sub lethal concentrations can seriously damage their gills.

Over abstraction of water from tributaries during the dry Winter months result in stretches of river being laid dry, killing fish and their food. In stream dams such as the Vaal and Gariep dams are barriers to fish migration and also regulate river flow, modifying food driven flows for much of the year.

Illegal netting takes place all over both river systems, usually near informal settlements. However some land owners or entrepreneurs trying to make extra money from selling fish, are also implicated. Law enforcement operations in which the South African Police Service is actively involved are under way.

Several alien fish species are now common in parts of the Orange and Vaal rivers. The predatory largemouth bass flourish in several dams on tributaries of the Vaal and in the Barrage below the Vaal dam. Carp are widespread and common in the system and compete with smallmouth yellowfish for food as well as eating yellowfish eggs at spawning time. The recent explosion of grass carp in dams of the middle Vaal river is seen as a potentially serious threat as this prolific species grows to more than 20 kg and is an obvious competitor for food.

Angling is one of the most popular forms of recreation in South Africa. Moreover, many subsistence fishermen depend on fish to provide their families with a valuable source of protein. Smallmouth yellowfish is a target for both parties who need to be informed of its conservation status. The two groups also need to bee managed effectively. At present, each province straddling the Orange-Vaal catchment area has different policies regarding the capture of yellowfish which complicates law enforcement and angler awareness. The effect of wading through spawning beds (especially by fly anglers) may also be a threat to the survival of yellowfish in heavily fished areas. Most provinces have legislation that prohibits people from interfering with spawning fish.

== Conservation and utilisation ==
Conservancies are terrestrial protected areas that are managed by conservation departments in some provinces. For those conservancies that include rivers, it offers an informal river protection facility. Bear in mind that conservancies can only be meaningful if participating land owners are made aware of river and fish issues and are guided in the implementation of relevant measures.

The Orange-Vaal River yellowfish Conservation and Management Association (OVRYCMA) is an association of 700 interested and affected people that support yellowfish conservation. The association was established on the Vaal river in 1996. The aims are simple and include three basic conservation concepts:

- Developing a managed conservation area
- Releasing captured yellowfish
- Educating and building capacity in people

There is a considerable body of national and provincial legislation that enable authorities to respond to illegal activities on rivers such as pollution, netting, interfering with spawning fish, stocking of alien species and so on. Legislation incorporated in provincial nature conservation ordinances also permits the effective management of smallmouth yellowfish and their habitat by means of regulations governing minimum size, bag limits, spawning season, spawning areas, etc. A major concern however is the current lack of capacity in nature conservation at provincial and national level to manage rivers and freshwater fish effectively.

The national River Health Programme (RHP) is used as the primary tool to monitor fish communities across South Africa. The Free State, Mpumalanga and Gauteng provinces have active and successful RHP's, but other provinces not. Yellowfish is generally used as an indicator species on the Orange and Vaal rivers to give managers an idea of the ecological state of the river. Large numbers of smallmouth as well as largemouth yellows in good health indicate ecologically healthy rivers.

Research is critical for managers to develop an understanding of the species and how they interact with their environment. This allows them to make informed decisions with regards to water flow releases, pollution standards and fisheries management protocols.

Several important and sizeable research programmes are currently under way on yellowfish in the Orange-Vaal system. These involve research on migration (Telemetry Project), conservation, genetics as well as a socio-economic study on the value of the resource.

Smallmouth yellowfish are highly prized gamefish and their proximity to the Gauteng heartland is the keystone of the yellowfish fly fishing industry in South Africa. The angling tourism industry centred on the Vaal river has been valued at a massive R1.2 billion per annum which includes direct costs (angling equipment) and indirect costs (transport, accommodation and food). All forms of angling have targeted this species with great success and organised angling has been very supportive of measures to improve conservation of the two yellowfish species in this river system - competitive fishing for either species has been discontinued. Subsistence fishers catch smallmouth readily on natural baits such as worms, crabs and minnows. Unfortunately they often focus on spawning fish as these are easy prey. It is essential to develop a programme to teach these anglers to target the more abundant alien carp as well as the sharp-tooth catfish (barbel) instead.

Subsistence and commercial fishers using trawl/seine nets and gill nets to target carp, catfish and moggel (Labeo umbratus) have operated for many years in certain designated dams in the Vaal and Orange rivers. The policy has now been changed and only trawl/seine nets may be used unless circumstances preclude their use, in which case a temporary permit may be issued to place gill nets in specific habitats where carp, moggel and catfish are most prevalent.

The Free State Department of Tourism, Environmental and Economic Affairs provide smallmouth yellowfish for stocking of farm dams as an alternative to alien fish species. The Gariep Dam State Fish Hatchery is making use of subsistence anglers to catch smallmouth yellowfish which are then kept in dams at the hatchery. These fish are then supplied to land owners in the Orange river catchment area to stock dams. This method is preferable to culturing/breeding yellowfish which can result in unwanted hybrids as well as fish with genetic material less than ideal for release into natural systems. This protocol flows from concepts developed at previous conferences of the Yellowfish Working Group (YWG) which emphasise that the provision of yellowfish should not be left up to the private sector as there is no control of such institutions. Neither should yellowfish be allowed to be transported into or within any province without a permit from the relevant conservation authority.
