= Potchefstroom Dam =

- Interactive map of Potchefstroom Dam
- Official name: Potchefstroom Dam
- Country: South Africa
- Location: North-West
- Coordinates: 26°40′12″S 27°5′50″E
- Opening date: 1950
- Owner: Potchefstroom Municipality (Tlokwe Local Municipality)

Dam and spillways
- Type of dam: Earth fill
- Impounds: Mooi River

Reservoir
- Creates: Potchefstroom Dam Reservoir

Potchefstroom Dam is a water reservoir (dam) on the Mooi River, on the northern boundary of Potchefstroom, North-West, South Africa. It was established in 1950.

== See also ==
- List of reservoirs and dams in South Africa
- List of rivers of South Africa
