= Klerkskraal Dam =

- Interactive map of Klerkskraal Dam
- Official name: Klerkskraal Dam
- Country: South Africa
- Location: North West
- Coordinates: 26°13′9″S 27°08′5″E
- Purpose: Irrigation
- Opening date: 1969
- Owner: Department of Water Affairs

Dam and spillways
- Type of dam: Arch-gravity dam
- Impounds: Mooi River
- Height: 13 m
- Length: 605 m

Reservoir
- Creates: Klerkskraal Dam Reservoir
- Total capacity: 8 023 000 m^{3}
- Catchment area: 1 324 km^{2}
- Surface area: 383 ha
- Maximum water depth: 6 m (avg 3.5 m)

Klerkskraal Dam is a combined gravity and arch type dam located on the Mooi River, near Ventersdorp, North West, South Africa. It was established in 1969 and its main purpose is to serve for irrigation. The hazard potential of the dam has been ranked high (3). The dam is also a well known bass fishing destination in the region.

== History ==
The construction of the dam was completed in 1969, the area behind the dam flooded quicker than anticipated thanks to heavy rainfall in the area resulting in a stronger discharge from the two major springs flowing into the dam and discharge from several perennial springs around the dam. The quicker flooding meant the area couldn't be cleared properly before the reservoir filled up, resulting in structures such as an old road, telephone poles and the old farm house structure being flooded and remain in the reservoir till this day.

== Fauna ==
Indigenous fish species in the dam include Sharptooth Catfish (clarias gariepinus), Orange River Mudfish (labeo capensis), Moggel (labeo umbratus),

Banded Tilapia (tilapia sparrmanii), Southern Mouthbrooder ( pseudocrenilabrus philander), Three spot Barb (enteromius trimaculatus), Chubbyhead Barb (enteromius anoplus), Straight-fin Barb (enteromius paludinosus) and Smallmouth Yellowfish (labeobarbus aeneus) and species introduced include Common Carp (cyprinus carpio), Largemouth Bass (micropterus dolomieu), Swordtail (Xiphophorus hellerii) and Western Mosquitofish (gambusia affinis).

236 grassland and wetland birds can be seen in the area. African Fish Eagle and Martial Eagle are residents at the dam and its surrounding area as well as Cape Clawless Otters, Warthog, Common Duiker, Steenbok, Caracal, Black backed Jackal, Cape Fox, Cape Porcupine, Honey Badger, Aardvark, Aardwolf, Cape Pangolin, African Hedgehog and Striped Polecat.

Nile and Rock Monitor lizards, African Rock Python, African Bullfrog can also be seen around the dam.

== Flora ==
The dam is completely surrounded with reeds (Phragmites mauritianus) with the exception of 5 or 6 narrow openings only wide enough to launch a boat. The dam also has dense patches of Potamogeton pectinatus, Lagarosiphon verticilifolia, Lagarosiphon major, Hydrilla verticillata, Elodea canadensis, and Myriophyllum spicatum. The area surrounding the dam is typical Highveld grassland with scattered acacia trees (Vachellia karroo), commonly known as the sweet thorn and haak-en-steek (Acacia tortilis).

== Geography ==
The dam is surrounded by at least 7 karst springs of which only 2 have a permanent flow throughout the year, the others are false eyes, only flowing in summer after the rains. The main eye is known as Bovenste Oog which draws water from the Turffontein compartment.

== Uses ==
=== Angling ===
The dam is very popular amongst bass anglers with boats or inflatables. As most anglers only target bass at the dam, the carp and catfish have grown to massive sizes.

Fish records at the dam
Species	Common name	Sixr	Year
Cyprinus carpio	Common Carp	30.65 kg	2018
Clarias gariepinus	Sharptooth Catfish	37.95 kg	2019
Micropterus dolomieu	Largemouth Bass	7..11 kg	2002
Labeobarbus aeneus	Smallmouth Yellowfish	4.51 kg	1998
Labeo capensis	Orange River Mudfish	2.12 kg	1995
Labeo umbratus	Moggel	1.66 kg	1999

=== Irrigation ===
The dam wall has a valve connecting the reservoir to an irrigation canal for farms downstream of the dam.

== See also ==
- List of reservoirs and dams in South Africa
- List of rivers of South Africa
