= Goldie barb =

Conservation status
- Least Concern (IUCN 3.1)

Scientific classification
- Kingdom: Animalia
- Phylum: Chordata
- Class: Actinopterygii
- Order: Cypriniformes
- Family: Cyprinidae
- Subfamily: Smiliogastrinae
- Genus: Enteromius
- Species: E. pallidus

Binomial name
- Enteromius pallidus A. Smith, 1841

Synonyms
- Barbus pallidus

Species of fish

The goldie barb (Enteromius pallidus) is a species of ray-finned fish in the genus Enteromius. It is endemic to the Eastern Cape in South Africa where it is threatened by the introduction of non-native fish species.

== Footnotes ==
- Froese, Rainer; Pauly, Daniel (eds.). "Enteromius pallidus". FishBase.
