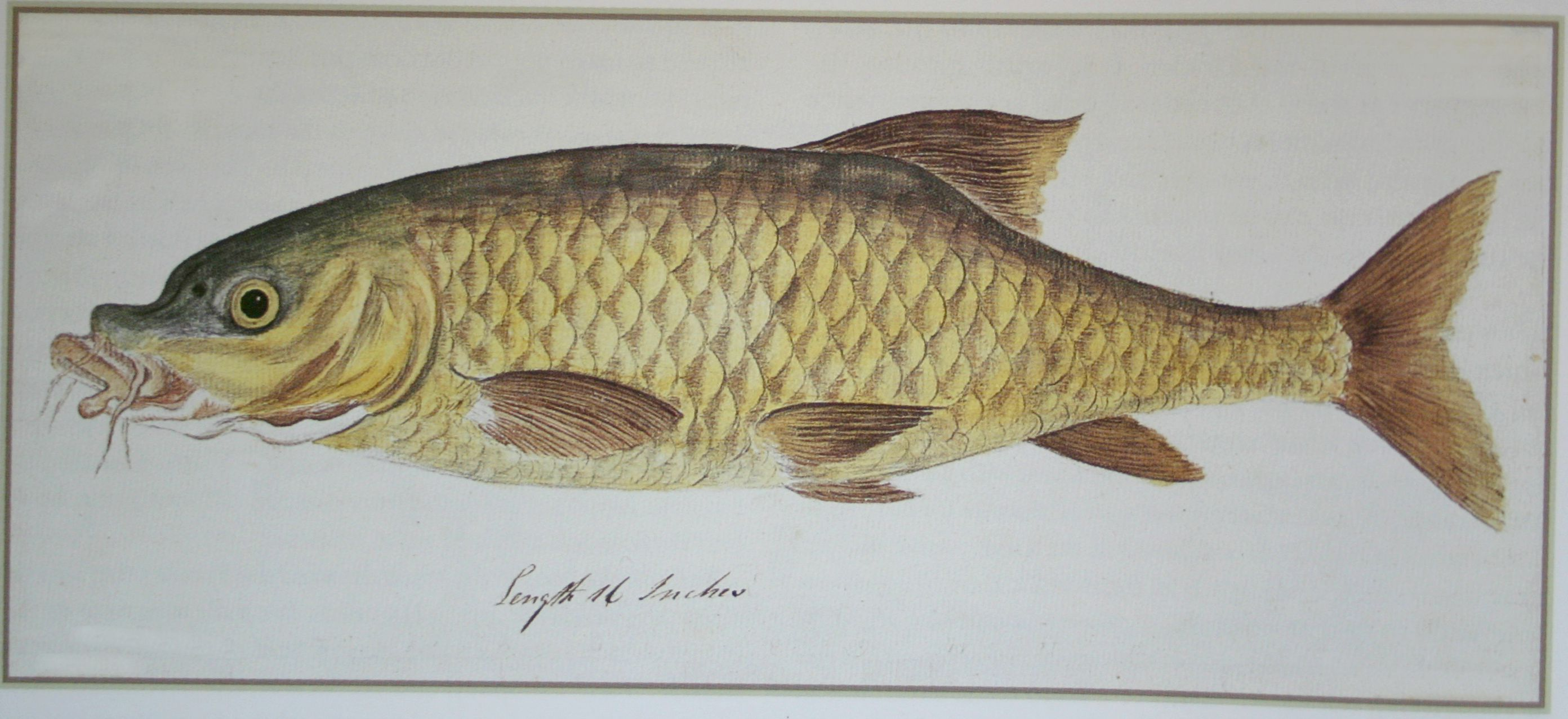
- Painted by Johannes Schumacher (1779)

Conservation status
- Least Concern (IUCN 3.1)

Scientific classification
- Kingdom: Animalia
- Phylum: Chordata
- Class: Actinopterygii
- Order: Cypriniformes
- Family: Cyprinidae
- Subfamily: Labeoninae
- Genus: Labeo
- Species: L. umbratus

Binomial name
- Labeo umbratus (A. Smith, 1841)

Synonyms
- Abrostomus umbratus Smith, 1841; Labeo cafer Castelnau, 1861; Labeo sicheli Castelnau, 1861; Labeo stenningi Gilchrist & Thompson, 1913

= Moggel =

Species of fish

Moggel (Labeo umbratus) is a freshwater African fish in genus Labeo. It occurs within the drainage basin of the Orange River. The species has been recorded in the Vaal River, Olifants River in Mpumalanga and Limpopo, introduced there by anglers.

This species is similar to L. capensis in colour and in its pronounced anterior barbels. It can withstand temperatures below 10 °C (50 °F) and is mainly found in stagnant water, muddy dams and in large impoundments. Juveniles of the species prey on invertebrates while adults subsist on detritus and mud. It is an important food source and is considered a useful species in wastewater aquaculture when combined with other aquatic organisms.

== Size ==
Length: 500–600 mm (20–24 in). Weight: 2.9 kg (6.4 lb)

== Distribution ==
Africa: within the drainage basin of the Orange river and in southern watersheds of the Cape region. There are records of Labeo umbratus from the Olifant's river (Limpopo system) where it has been introduced by anglers. Has also been translocated in the Olifants-Limpopo system.

== Behavior ==
Found mainly in standing waters, shallow dams and muddy shallow areas such as in large impoundments. Juveniles feed on small invertebrates while adults feed on detritus and mud soft sediments.

== Breeding ==
The Moggel breed after rains in summer, migrating upstream to suitable spawning sites, usually over flooded grassy banks of rivers with shallow rocky sections. Female lays about 250,000 small sticky eggs which attach to grass and rocks, they hatch within 40 hours thereafter the newly hatched larvae repeatedly swim to the surface and get carried away by the current to deeper water.

== Uses ==
Valued as an important, nutritious food source and is recommended for use in wastewater aquaculture in combination with other aquatic organisms.

Occasionally caught by anglers using bait or flies whilst targeting other species, is known for its strong fighting ability. It is often regarded as an 'easter egg' fish when caught as they are nearly impossible to target specifically, catches are usually by chance. Important in commercial and subsistence fisheries and also used in aquaculture and physiological research.
