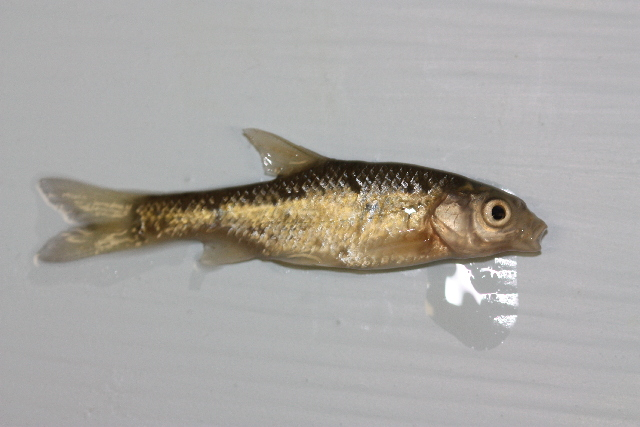

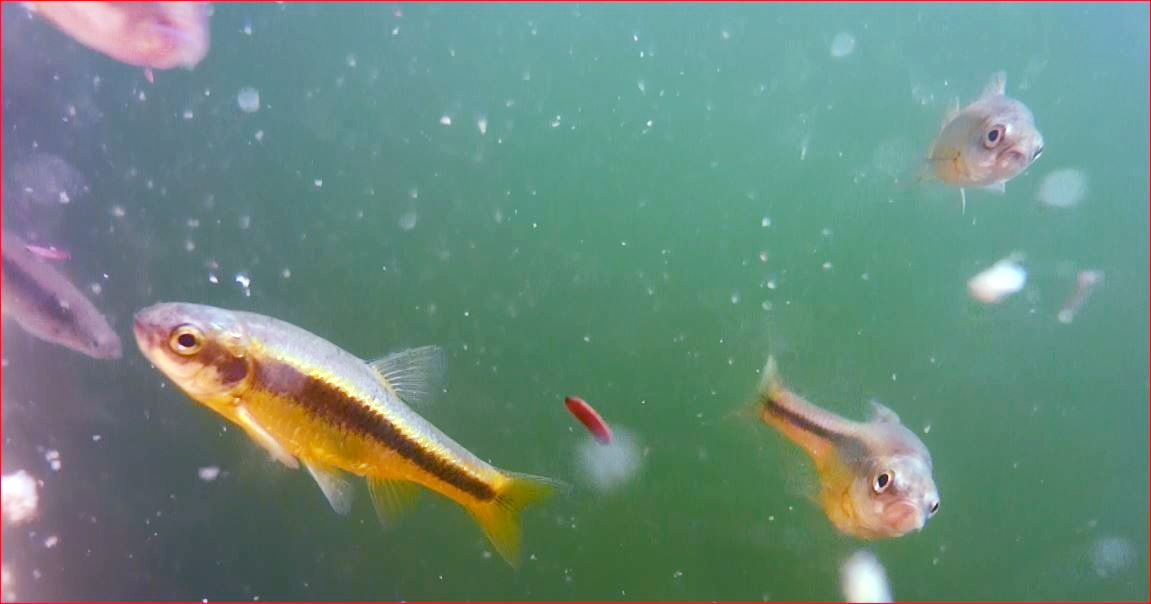

Conservation status
- Least Concern (IUCN 3.1)

Scientific classification
- Kingdom: Animalia
- Phylum: Chordata
- Class: Actinopterygii
- Order: Cypriniformes
- Family: Cyprinidae
- Subfamily: Smiliogastrinae
- Genus: Enteromius
- Species: E. anoplus

Binomial name
- Enteromius anoplus (Weber, 1897)
- IUCN range Extant (resident) Probably extant (resident)

Synonyms
- Barbus anoplus Weber, 1897; Barbus karkensis Gilchrist & Thompson, 1913; Barbus cernuus Barnard, 1938

= Chubbyhead barb =

Species of fish

The chubbyhead barb (Enteromius anoplus) is a species of freshwater ray-finned fish in the genus Enteromius. The fish is found throughout South Africa in a variety of aquatic environments. The species is notable for its two breeding seasons, which allows it to flourish despite a short lifespan.

== Identification ==
The females (120 mm (4.7 in)) are larger than males (100 mm (3.9 in)). They have blunt heads with a small mouth. A few barbels reach down from the mouth. During the breeding season the males are brightly golden coloured, otherwise all the fish are a greyish green on the back with a small spot on the tail fin.

== Distribution ==
The fish is widespread in rivers from the Highveld down to KwaZulu-Natal, former Transkei and the middle and upper parts of the Orange River. The species is also found in the bigger rivers of the Western and Eastern Cape.

== Habitat ==
The fish prefers cooler water to live in and occur in a variety of habitats, from large lakes and rivers to small streams. They keep to dark waters where there are shadows, for example under fallen trees. They breed twice during the year, once between November and January and again from February to March. It is thought that the dual breeding seasons has allowed Enteromius anoplus to be as successful as it is in entering various environments across South Africa.

The female lays her eggs against the vegetation. The larvae hatch within three days and began to swim and feed after 6 to 7 days and reach maturity after one year. Most males are only two years old and females reach up to three years old. The species is omnivorous and eat insects, zoo plankton, green algae and diatoms. They themselves fall prey to larger fish and birds.
