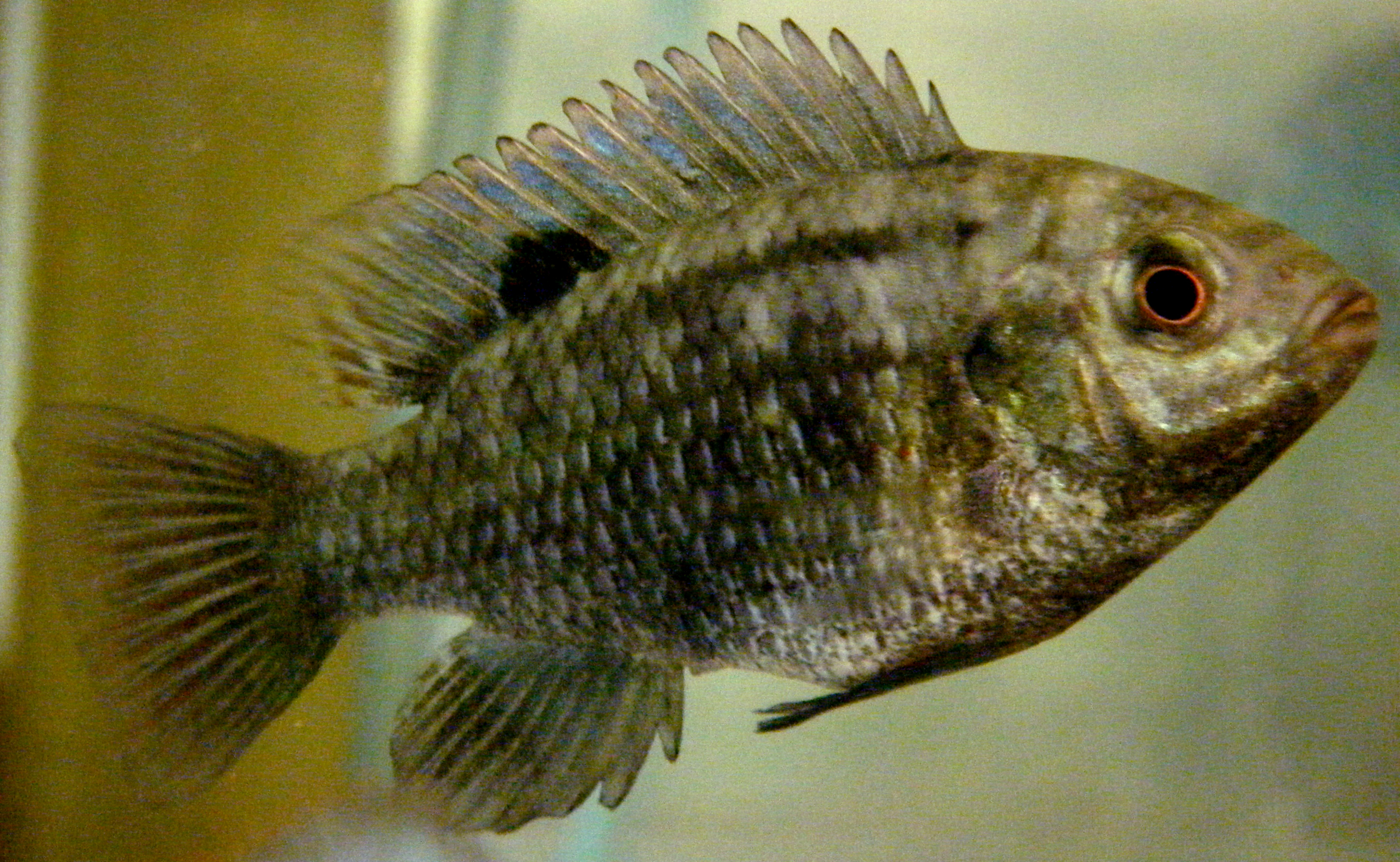
- Banded tilapia from Lake Chilingali, Malawi

Conservation status
- Least Concern (IUCN 3.1)

Scientific classification
- Kingdom: Animalia
- Phylum: Chordata
- Class: Actinopterygii
- Order: Cichliformes
- Family: Cichlidae
- Genus: Tilapia
- Species: T. sparrmanii

Binomial name
- Tilapia sparrmanii A. Smith, 1840

Synonyms
- Chromis sparrmanii (A. Smith, 1840); Chromys moffatii Castelnau, 1861; Chromis ovalis Steindachner, 1866; Tilapia ovalis (Steindachner, 1866); Tilapia fouloni Boulenger, 1905; Tilapia deschauenseei Fowler, 1931

= Tilapia sparrmanii =

Species of fish

Tilapia sparrmanii, the banded tilapia, or vlei kurper, is a widespread and adaptable cichlid fish that is found in warmer freshwater habitats of southern Africa. They prefer water with ample plant cover, and occur naturally as far north as DR Congo and Tanzania. They have been introduced locally in the northern hemisphere. Younger banded tilapia feed on crustaceans and insect larvae, while the adults feed on terrestrial and aquatic plants and other debris. They undertake local migrations and may shoal before and during spawning time. They guard their own eggs, and although they may move eggs or fry in the mouth, they are not known to be actual mouthbrooders like several other tilapia species. This species can reach a length of 23.5 centimetres (9.3 in) TL and is an important foodfish.

The identity of the person honoured in the specific name is uncertain but it is probably the Swedish naturalist Anders Sparrman (1748-1820) who was in the Cape in 1775.

== Distribution ==
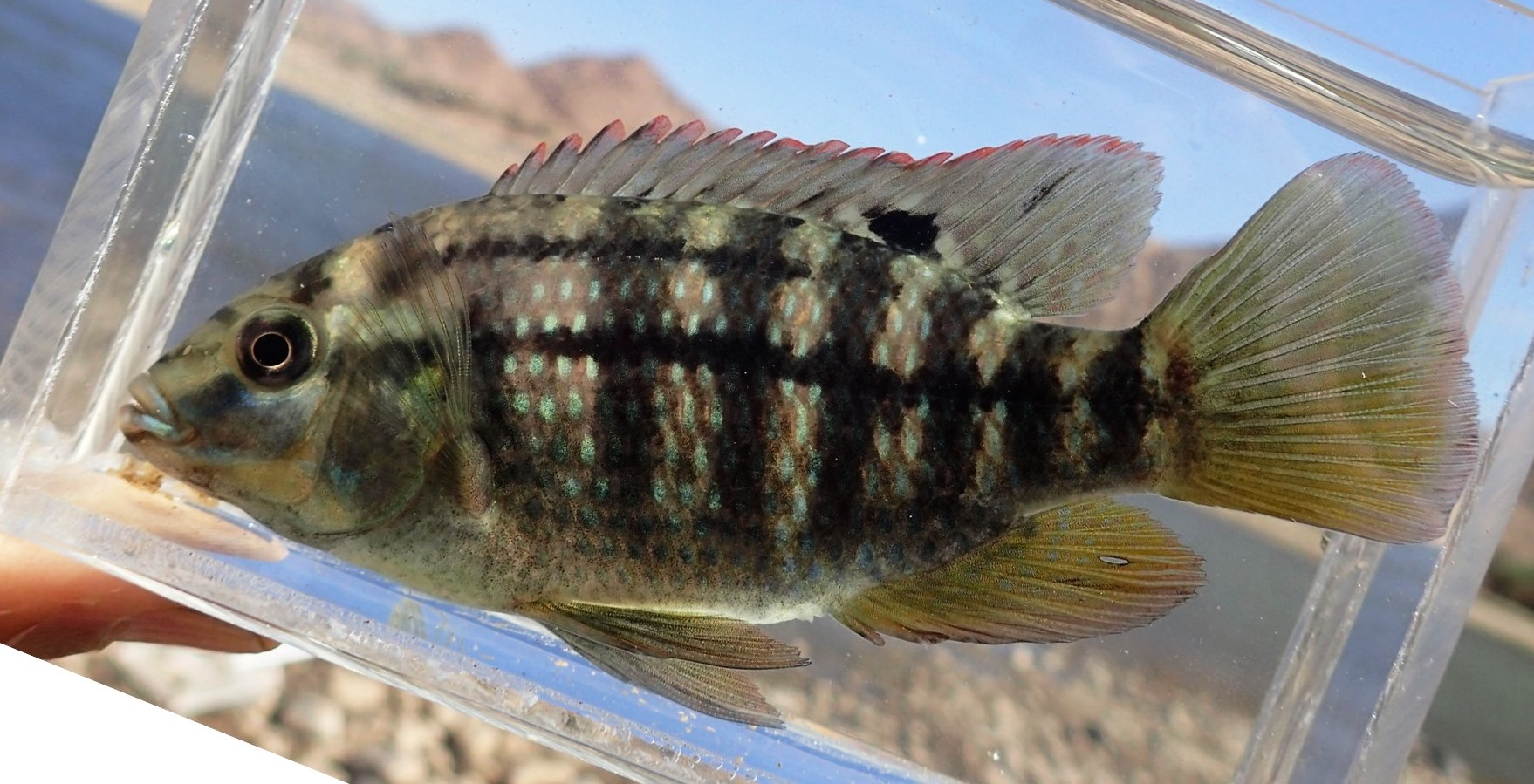
In South Africa

Africa: middle Congo River basin in the Kwilu, Kwango, Kasai drainage and Lomami, upper Congo River basin including the Lualaba, upper Lualaba, Lufira, Upemba region, Luvua, Lake Mweru, Luapula and Bangweulu, Cunene, Okavango, Lake Ngami, Zambezi, Limpopo, northern tributaries of the Orange River, upper Cuanza, Sabi, Lundi and Lake Malawi.

== Description ==
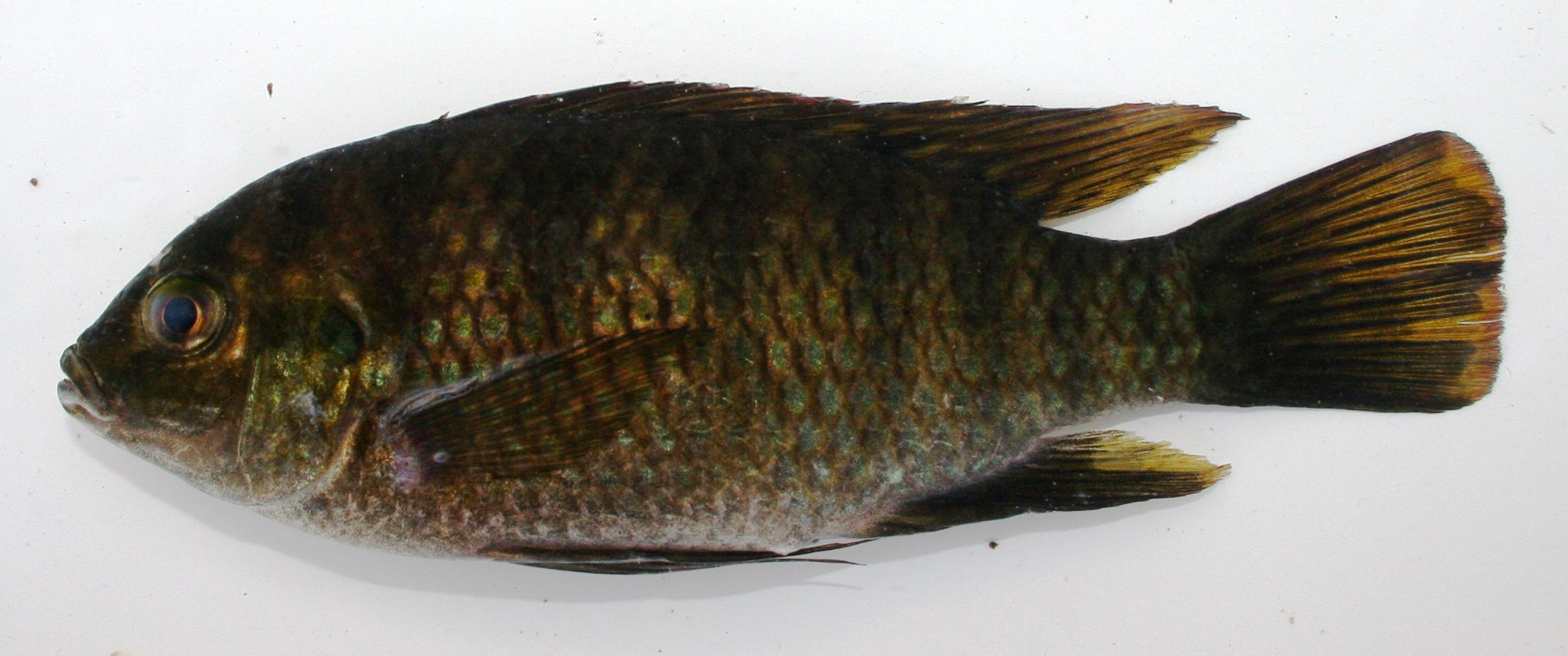
Tilapia sparrmanii collected in Lavushi Manda National Park, Zambia, by the South African Institute for Aquatic Biodiversity

Dorsal spines (total): 13 - 15. Diagnosis: A small, deep-bodied species with a narrow head and small strong jaws. Often appearing a rich deep yellow with wide dark brown bands, and red/orange fin margins; mature adults are very dark with prominent black stripes and a patch of scarlet scales behind the head.

Fish can grow up to 235mm in length and the heaviest fish recorded was 445g.

== Habitat ==
Found in widely diverse habitat, it favors areas where plant cover exists along the edges of rivers, lakes or swamps, but tends to be confined to shallow weedy areas, so it does not build up large populations in deep lakes. It is reported to be cold-confined.

== Diet ==
Adults are omnivorous, feeding on animal and plant matter, preferentially on filamentous algae, aquatic macrophytes and vegetable matter of terrestrial origin like leaves, plants, etc.. Juveniles feed on small crustaceans and midge larvae.

== Breeding ==
A substrate spawner. Male and female form pairs to rear the young. It undertakes seasonal upstream migration and breeds before and during these migrations

== Uses ==
A relatively small species, so unlikely to play much of a role in capture fisheries, but cultured in ponds in Njombe, Tanzania, and apparently stocked into Lake Kiungululu, Tanzania, where it is not presently exploited.

It is a forage fish for Bass.

Popular angling species amongst young and inexperienced anglers, often regarded as 'gateway' species for people new to angling.
