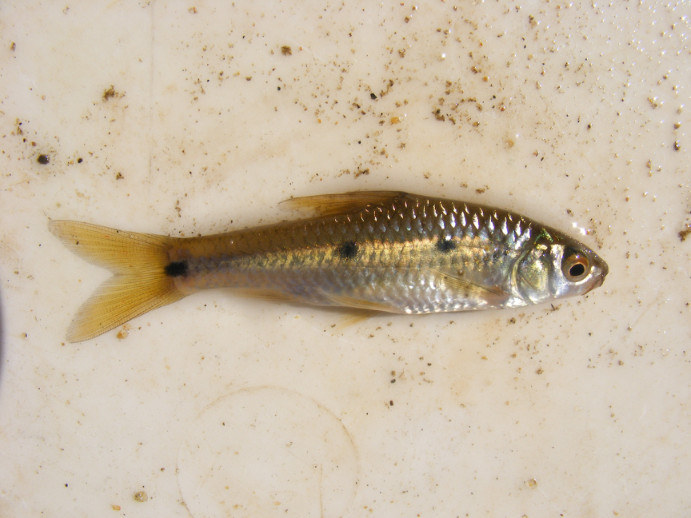

Conservation status
- Least Concern (IUCN 3.1)

Scientific classification
- Kingdom: Animalia
- Phylum: Chordata
- Class: Actinopterygii
- Order: Cypriniformes
- Family: Cyprinidae
- Subfamily: Smiliogastrinae
- Genus: Enteromius
- Species: E. trimaculatus

Binomial name
- Enteromius trimaculatus W. K. H. Peters, 1852

Synonyms
- Barbus trimaculatus Peters, 1852; Barbus kurumani Castelnau, 1861; Barbus breijeri Weber, 1897; Barbus katangae Boulenger, 1900; Barbus decipiens Boulenger, 1907

= Threespot barb =

Species of fish

Threespot barb (Enteromius trimaculatus) is a species of cyprinid fish in the large genus Enteromius. It has a wide distribution in sub-Saharan Africa from the Congo Basin east to the Indian Ocean coast of Tanzania and south to KwaZulu Natal in South Africa. It occurs in shallow water around river inflows or near swampy areas. It is a habitat generalist and also hardy, but it prefers vegetated areas. It feeds on insects and other small animals. It is often caught for use as bait by anglers fishing for tigerfish. It breeds during the summer rainy season when shoals of fertile adults migrate upstream when the rivers are in spate following rain. A single females may produce as many as 8,000 eggs.
