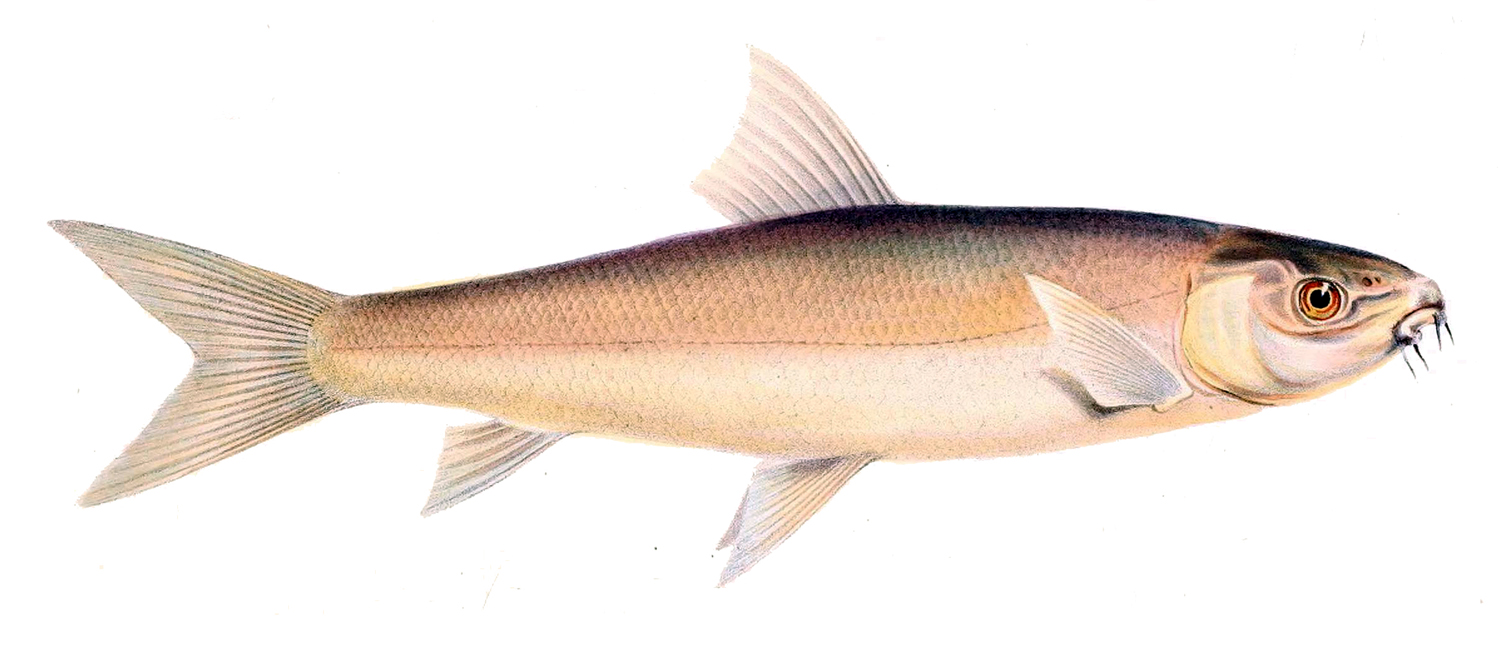

Conservation status
- Least Concern (IUCN 3.1)

Scientific classification
- Kingdom: Animalia
- Phylum: Chordata
- Class: Actinopterygii
- Order: Cypriniformes
- Family: Cyprinidae
- Genus: Labeo
- Species: L. capensis

Binomial name
- Labeo capensis (A. Smith, 1841)

Synonyms
- Abrostomus capensis A. Smith, 1841; Labeo tenuirostris Steindachner, 1894

= Orange River mudfish =

Species of fish

Orange River mudfish (Labeo capensis) is a species of fish in genus Labeo. It inhabits the Orange River system of southern Africa.

== Size ==
L. capensis reaches a maximum length of 500 mm (20 in) and the SA angling record is 3.83 kg (8 lb 7 oz).

== Biology and ecology ==
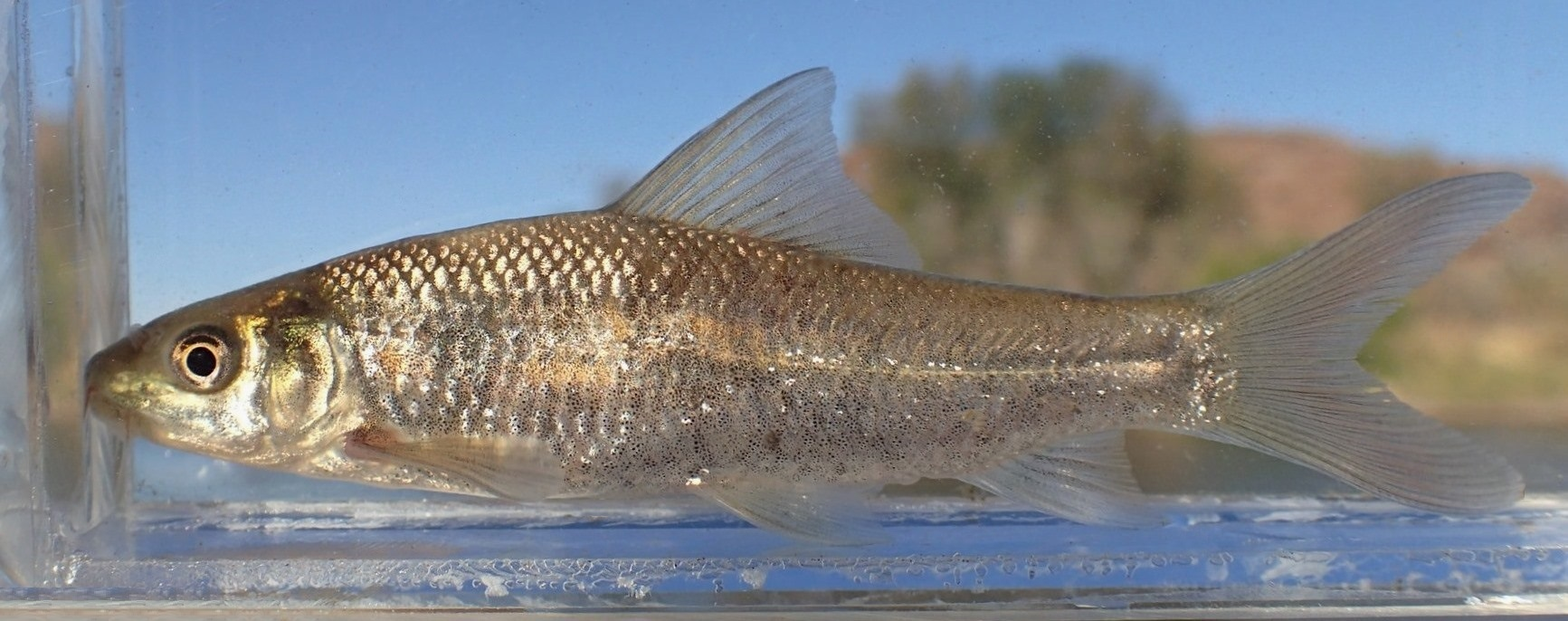
L. capensis from the Fish River in Namibia

Occurs in a variety of habitats: quiet well vegetated backwaters, standing open waters, flowing open waters, sandy-rocky stretches and rocky rapids. Their preferred habitat is flowing rocky channels. Bottom feeder which grazes algae and organic detritus.

Breeds in summer, gathering in large numbers in shallow rocky rapids where eggs are laid. Larvae hatch after 3 or 4 days. May live up to 8 or 9 years.

== Range ==
Africa: within the drainage basin of the Orange-Vaal River system to which it is possibly restricted. Introduced to the Fish River system in Eastern Cape, and the Crocodile River (West).

== Uses ==
Occasional angling species, also used in physiological and ecological research and is a potential commercial species.
