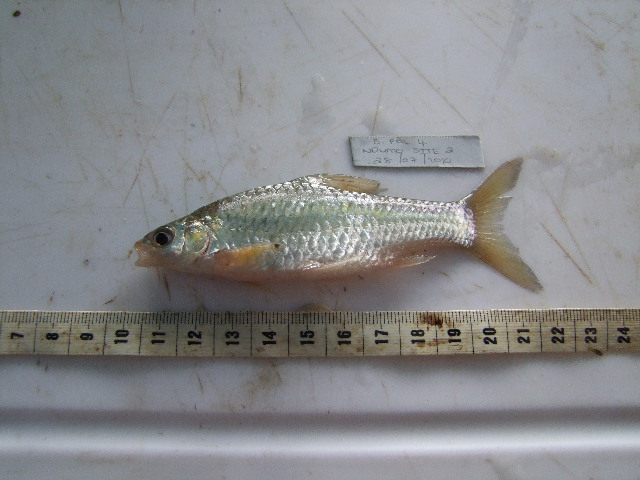

Conservation status
- Least Concern (IUCN 3.1)

Scientific classification
- Kingdom: Animalia
- Phylum: Chordata
- Class: Actinopterygii
- Order: Cypriniformes
- Family: Cyprinidae
- Subfamily: Smiliogastrinae
- Genus: Enteromius
- Species: E. paludinosus

Binomial name
- Enteromius paludinosus W. K. H. Peters, 1852

Synonyms
- Barbus paludinosus See text

= Straightfin barb =

Species of fish

The straightfin barb (Enteromius paludinosus) is a species of ray-finned fish in the family Cyprinidae. E. pleurogramma is sometimes included here, but while it is certainly extremely closely related, it appears to be a distinct cryptic species.

The straightfin barb is found in Burundi, Kenya, Malawi, Tanzania, Uganda and Zambia.

Its natural habitats are rivers, freshwater lakes, freshwater marshes, and inland deltas.

It is not considered a threatened species by the International Union for Conservation of Nature.
