= Vaal River =

Tributary of the Orange River, South Africa

Vaal / ǀHai Lekwa, IliKwa, iLigwa
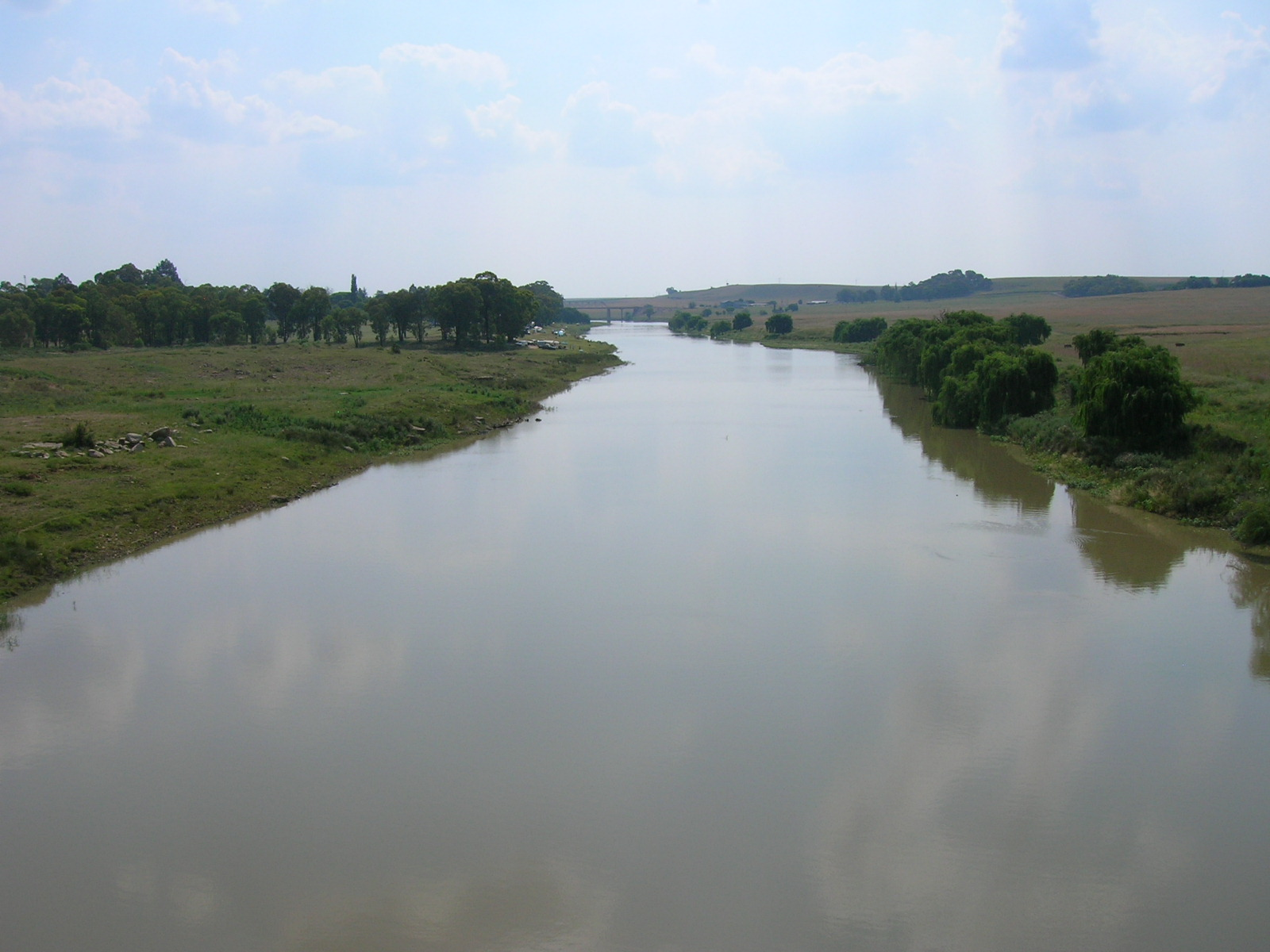
- The Vaal seen from the N3 national freeway, upstream from the Vaal Dam. Here it forms the border between the Mpumalanga and Free State provinces.

- Location of the Vaal River mouth
- Etymology: ǀHai "Pale" + ǃArib "River"
- Native name: ǀHaiǃarib (Korana)

Location
- Country: South Africa
- Region: Free State, Gauteng, Northern Cape, Mpumalanga

Physical characteristics
- Source
  - location: Near Breyten
- Mouth: Orange River
  - location: Near Douglas
  - coordinates: 29°4′15″S 23°38′10″E
  - elevation: 1,241 m (4,072 ft)
- Length: 1,458 km (906 mi)
- Basin size: 196,438 km^{2} (75,845 sq mi)
- Discharge
  - location: Orange River
  - average: 125 m^{3}/s (4,400 cu ft/s)

Basin features
- Tributaries
  - left: Vet River

The Vaal River (/ˈvɑːl/ Afrikaans pronunciation: [ˈfɑːl]; Khoemana: ǀHaiǃarib) is the largest tributary of the Orange River in South Africa. The river has its source near Breyten in Mpumalanga province, east of Johannesburg and about 30 kilometres (19 mi) north of Ermelo and only about 240 kilometres (150 mi) from the Indian Ocean. It then flows westwards to its confluence with the Orange River southwest of Kimberley in the Northern Cape. It is 1,458 kilometres (906 mi) long, and forms the border between Mpumalanga, Gauteng and North West Province on its north bank, and the Free State on its south.

It is the third largest river in South Africa after the Orange River (2200 km long) and the Limpopo River (1750 km long) and was established as the main source of water for the great Witswatersrand area after the 19th century gold rush. The Vaal Dam lies on the Vaal River in Deneysville just south of the border between Gauteng and the Free State. The Vaal River is the longest river wholly within the borders of South Africa.

Vaal is a Dutch name (later Afrikaans), translated by the Griquas or Boers from an earlier Kora Khoekhoe or !Orakobab name, sometimes spelled as Tky-Gariep (in Khoekhoegowab orthography it is ǀHai!garib, drab river). Both Vaal and Tky (in modern orthography ǀHai) mean "drab" or "dull", which alludes to the colour of the waters, especially noticeable during flood season when the river is laden with silt. In the upper reaches the river was named iLigwa (Sindebele), Ikwa or Igwa (isiZulu), ilikwa (siSwati), lekwa (Sesotho), or cuoa by the Khoekhoe, all referring to the plain it traverses.

== History ==
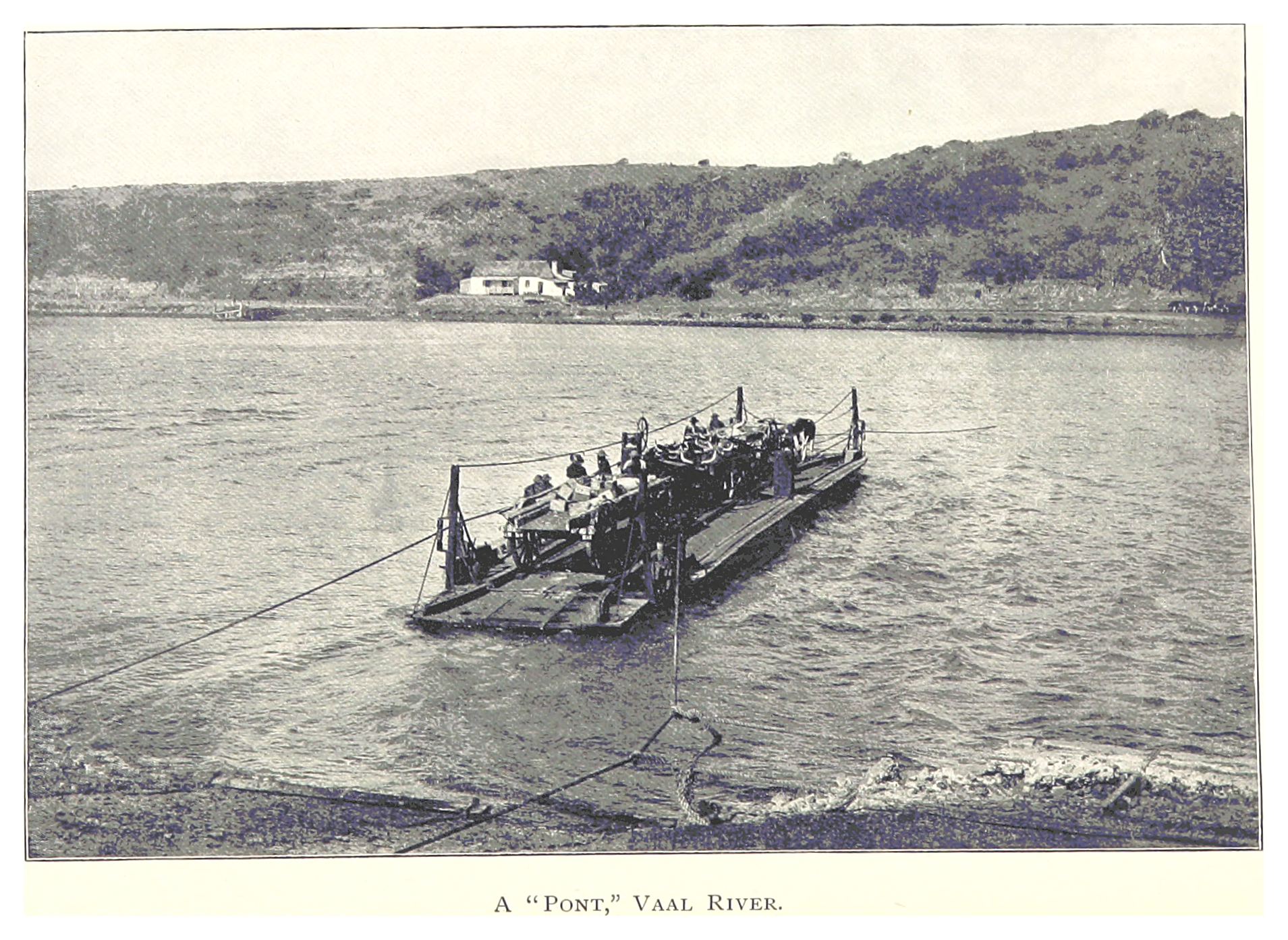
Pont (ferry) on the Vaal River (anno 1899)

Historically, the river formed the northern border of Moshoeshoe I's Basotho kingdom at its height in the mid-19th century, then became the boundary between two Boer republics: The South African Republic (later the Transvaal province) and the Orange Free State. The geographic name "Transvaal" comes from the name of this river, meaning "beyond the Vaal river". This was in respect to the Cape Colony and Natal, which were the main areas of European settlement at the time, and which lay south of the Vaal.

During the late 19th century, there was an influx of people migrating to the Witwatersrand in search of gold. The Vaal River would eventually become the main water source for the Witwatersrand. The growing population initially used water from the groundwater of the Zuurbekom Wells in Gauteng's West Rand. Eventually these would dry up and people would need a new source that could provide for their domestic, agricultural and industrial activities.

Water schemes were initially established by the private sector to deal with the growing demand. These included the Braamfontein Water Company's Vierfontein Syndicate of 1893 and the Sivewright Concession of 1887 by the Johannesburg Waterworks and Exploration Company. Water was expensive and largely inaccessible for most inhabitants.

=== Rand Water Board ===
The Rand Water Board was established in 1903 to take over the operations of the private sector with a mandate to investigate sustainable water supply and sanitation services. The organisation would become fully operational in 1905, supplying water in bulk to the Witwatersrand. The organisation's members included officials from the Johannesburg Town Council, The Chamber of Mines and other local authorities within the Witwatersrand.

Rand Water responded to water scarcity by imposing restrictions on Witwatersrand inhabitants in 1913. It also developed major water schemes that would respond to the growing demand. Between 1914 and 1998, the organisation partnered with various government and private entities to drive the Vaal River scheme and the barrage (1914–1924). The Vaal River scheme was an initiative established to manage water distribution. The Rand Water board also established the Vereeniging Pumping Station (1924), the Zwartkopjes Pumping Station, the Vaal Dam (1938), the Zuikerbosch Pumping Station (1949) and the Lesotho Highlands Water Project (1998).

== River Basin ==
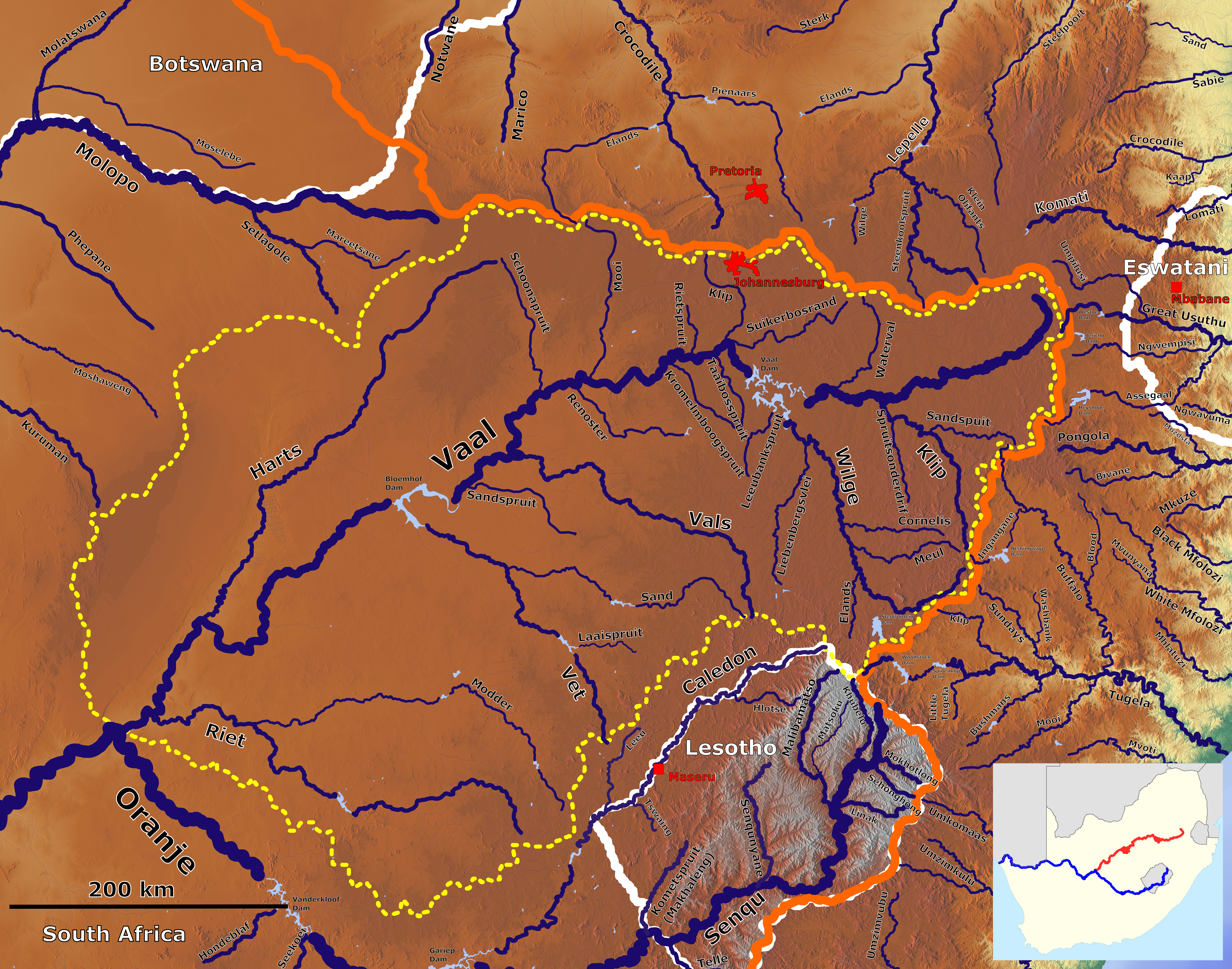
The Vaal River Basin. The Vaal Basin in yellow and the Oranje Basin in orange.

Rain and underground water collects in pans, vleis and streams and where these connect, the westward flowing Vaal River is born. The river flows west into the Grootdraai Dam near Standerton, Mpumalanga. On its course to the Vaal Dam in Vereeniging, the river is joined by a number of tributaries. The Little Vaal River starts in an escarpment near Ermelo. Near Memel in the Free State is where the Klip River begins. The Watervals River begins in Secunda, Mpumalanga. The Wilge River used to meet the Vaal River before the Vaal Dam was built in 1938; now the water flows straight into the dam. Kromelmboogspruit joins the Vaal near the Vaal Barrage.

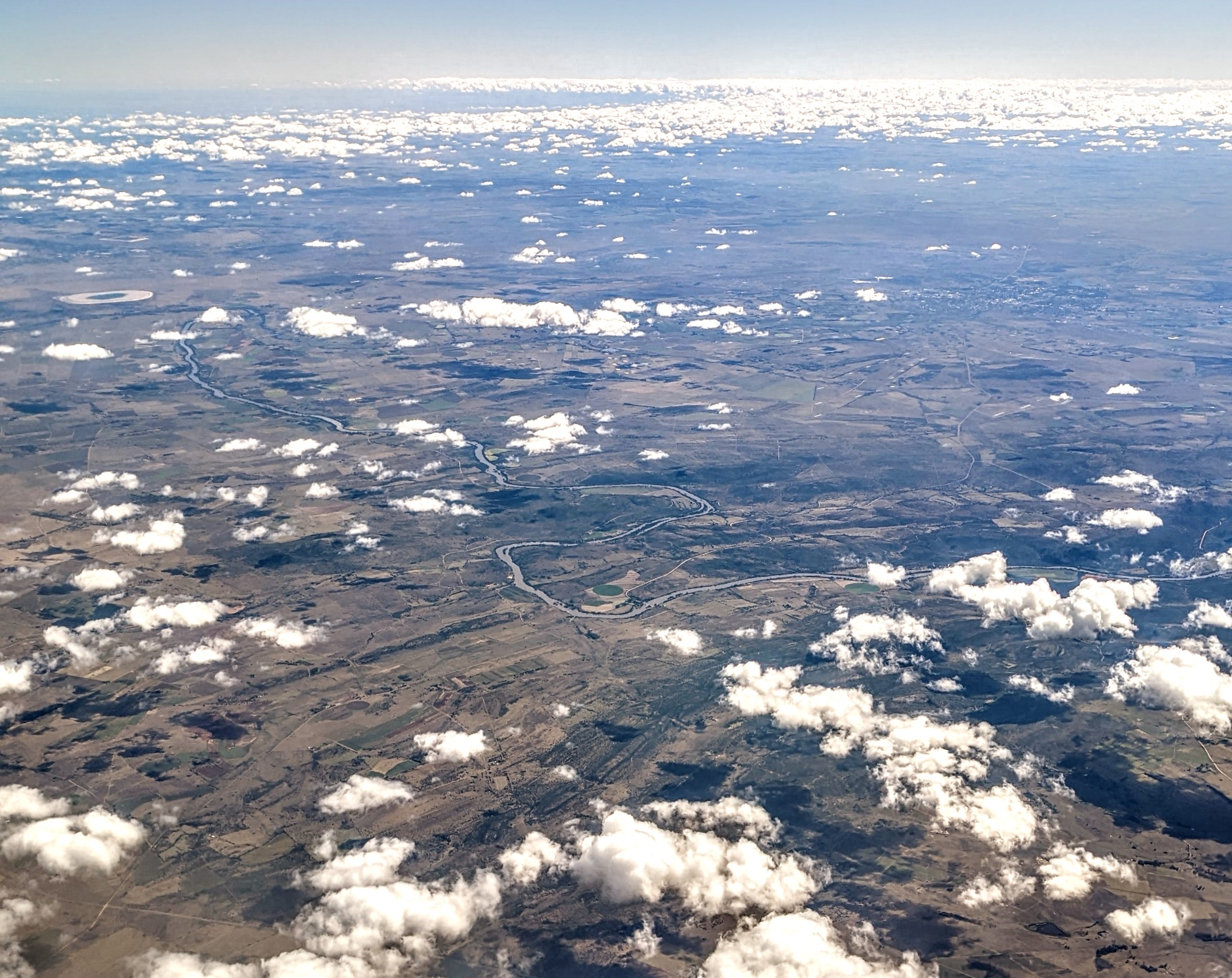
Vaal River near Venterskroon

=== Vaal Dam ===
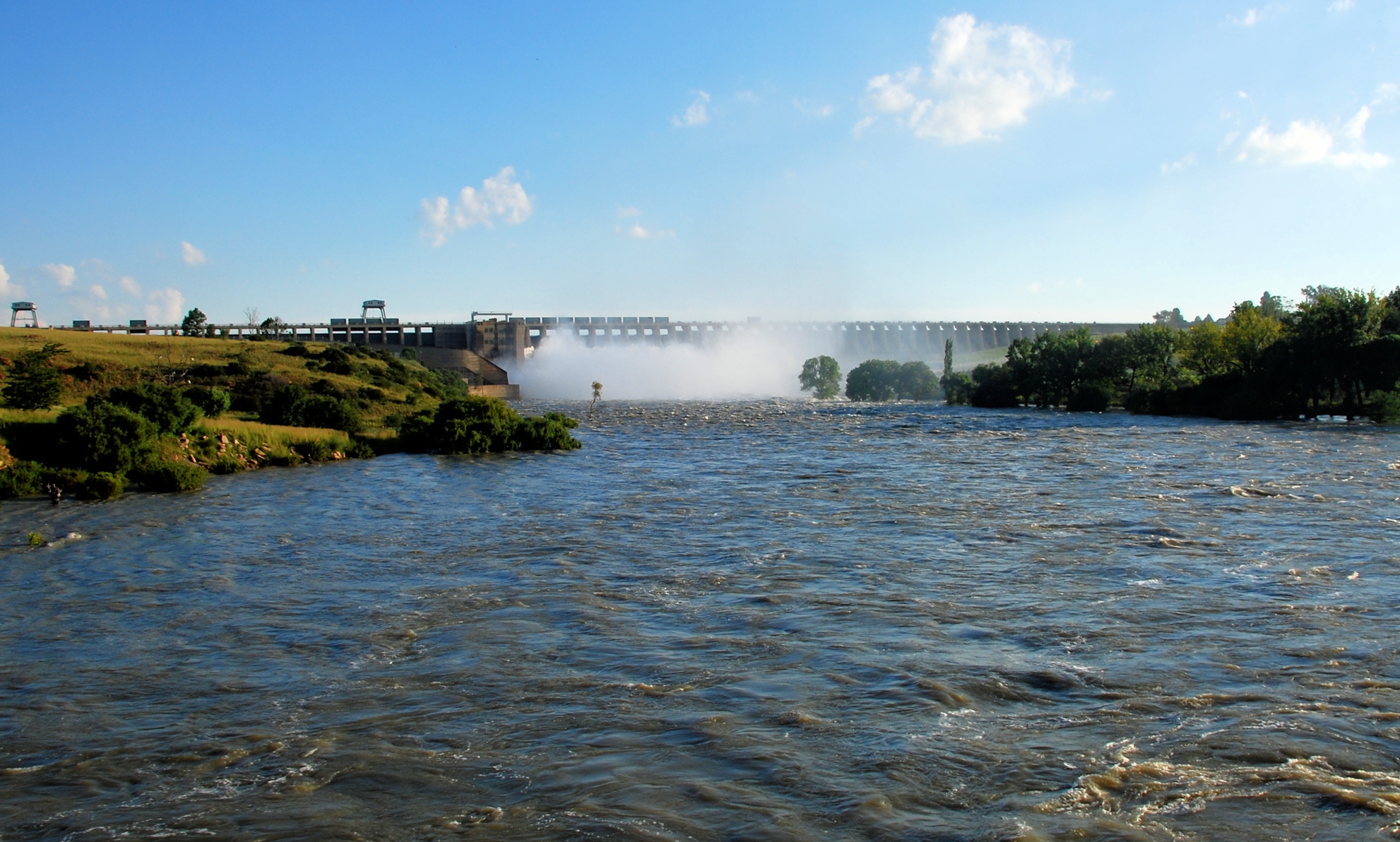
A full Vaal Dam in 2010

Since the Vaal River's surface runoff is erratic, large dams have been built along its course to collect the water. In the past, before the river was established as the official source of water for part of the Gauteng, several small dams were built by farmers for irrigation.

When the construction of the Vaal Dam was completed in 1938, the dam ensured the supply of water throughout each year even when the river was not full. The dam would receive water from different catchment areas through various projects.

=== Tugela-Vaal Transfer Scheme ===
Two water transfer schemes were developed to supply the economic heartland of the country (then recognised as the Pretoria-Witwatersrand-Vereeniging complex) by channelling water into the Vaal River from other catchment areas between the 1970s and 1990s. These include the Lesotho Highlands Water Project and KwaZulu-Natal's Tugela-Vaal Water Transfer Scheme. The Tugela-Vaal Transfer Scheme was completed in 1974 to transfer from the Tugela River in KwaZulu Natal via canals, pipelines and dams into the Vaal River system

=== Lesotho Highlands Water Project ===
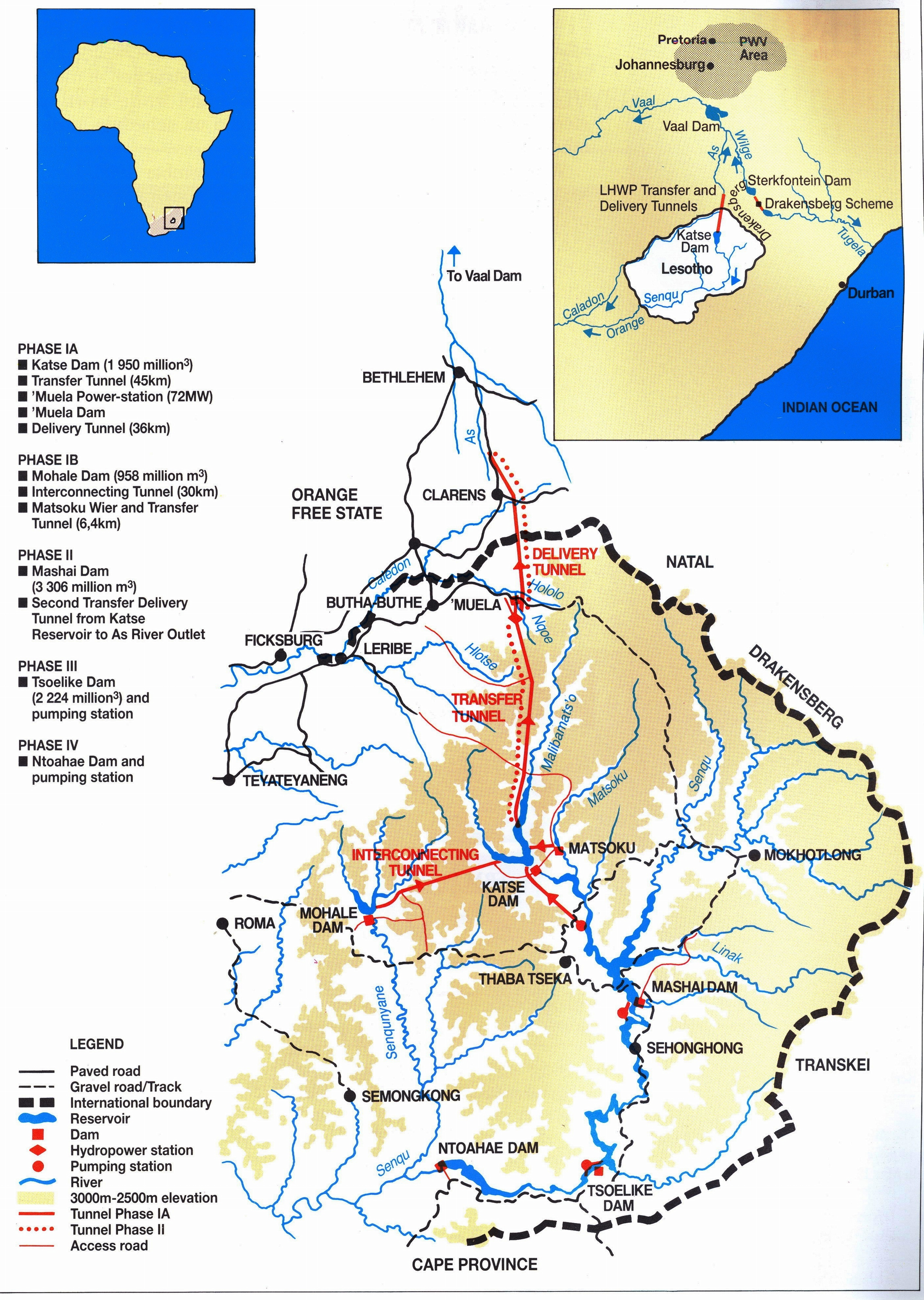
Lesotho Highlands Water Project map

The Lesotho Highlands Water Project was finally launched in 1997 and would entail a three-phase construction that would augment water from Lesotho into the Vaal River, including four major dams. From 1954, the Natural Resources Development Council proposed that South Africa receive some water from neighbouring Lesotho. Negotiations between the two countries started in the late 1970s. A treaty for the development of the scheme was signed on 24 October 1987 by representatives of Lesotho, South Africa, the European Union, United Nations and the World Bank. It was then estimated to cost R9.1 billion for the first phase of the project alone.

South Africa pays R150 million to Lesotho each year whether they use all of the water that is supplied or not.

=== Basin ecology ===
According to Hogan the headwaters portion of the basin supports high endemism in reptiles, and lower in the watershed are elevated levels of endemism for small mammals.

== Industry and agriculture ==
Water is drawn from the Vaal to meet the industrial needs of the Greater Johannesburg Metropolitan Area and a large part of the Free State. In 1881 the Kimberley Waterworks Company, provided water from the Vaal to the Cape Diamond Fields at a cost of one shilling per 100 imperial gallons (450 L; 120 US gal).

As a part of the Vaal-Hartz Scheme it is a major source of water for irrigation. Water drawn from the Vaal supports 12 million consumers in Gauteng and surrounding areas.

== Current uses ==
The majority of the Vaal River water upstream of the Vaal Dam is used for mining and industrial use such as coal mines and Sasol's energy and chemical-related activities, as well as urban use and power generation. Further downstream of the dam, water is mostly dedicated to urban requirements and, although proportionally less, a considerable amount of this section is also used for mining and industries, irrigation and power generation. The river regularly experiences pollution of its upper reaches, and this affects users downstream. During 2019 the Lekwa Local Municipality's main water treatment plant in Standerton was in disrepair and was causing chronic pollution problems. To assist users downstream, clean water had to be pumped into the river to dilute its high salt levels, thereby wasting a large quantity of this scarce resource. In 2021, a report released by the South African Human Rights Commission found the river to be polluted beyond acceptable levels, including the flow of raw sewerage into the River.

== Tourism ==
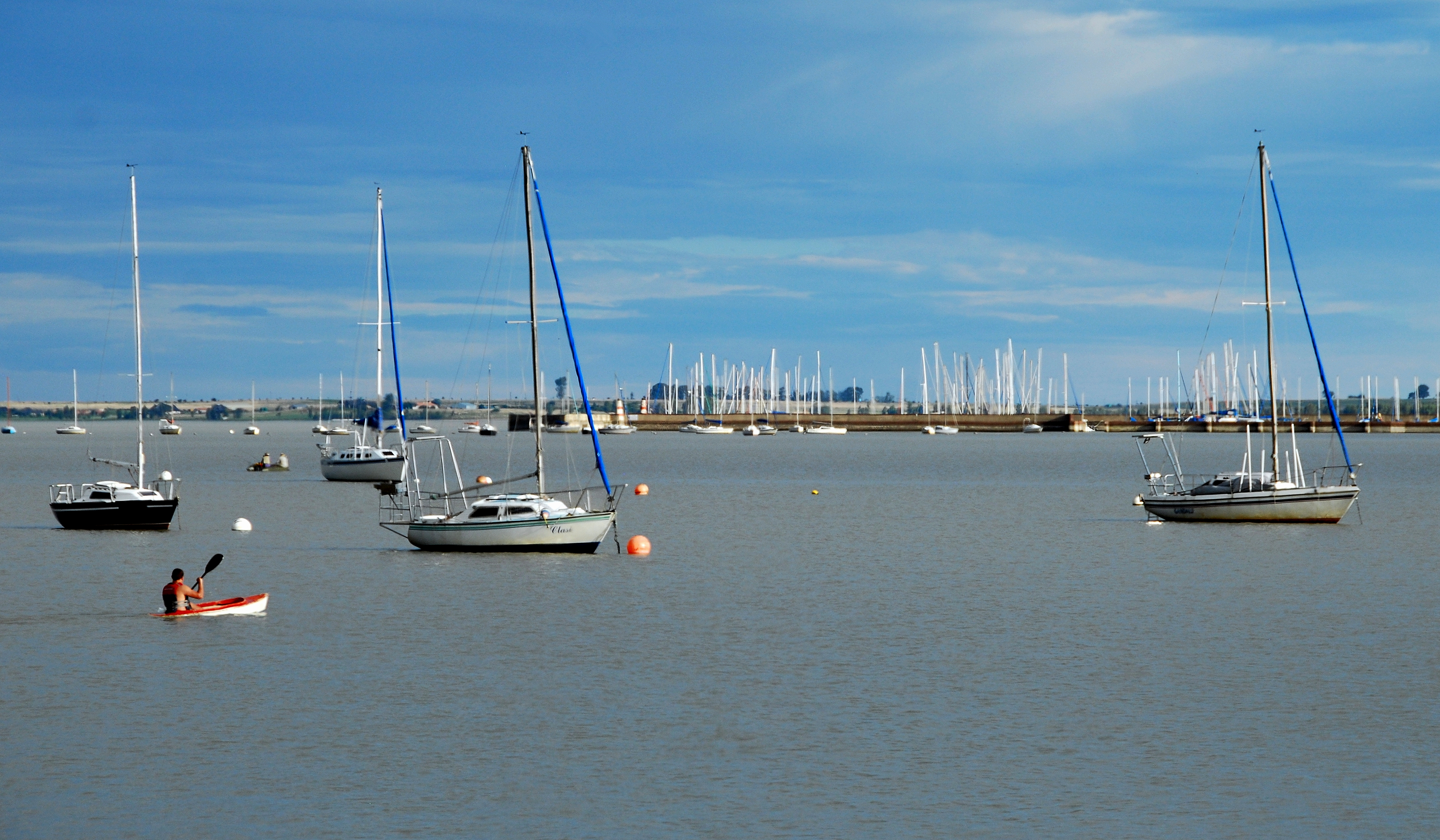
Vaal Dam at Deneysville

The Vaal River is made up of 50 km of navigable water. The river basin thus offers a range of leisurely water activities that attract local and international tourists throughout the year. Activities include boating, yachting and water skiing.

Deneysville is a town on the Free State side of the Vaal River and is a popular water-centre where visitors can enjoy swimming, kiteboarding, yachting, boating, catamaran cruising, jet skiing, windsurfing, snorkelling and fishing.

== See also ==
- Orange River
- List of rivers in South Africa
- Lower Vaal Water Management Area
- Vaal Dam
- Witwatersrand basin
- Witwatersrand Gold Rush
- Drainage basins of South Africa
