= Aberfeldy, Free State =

Aberfeldy
- Location within Free State (South African province) Location within South Africa
- Coordinates: 28.215°S 28.825°E
- Country: South Africa
- Province: Free State
- District: Thabo Mofutsanyane
- Municipality: Maluti-a-Phofung
- Time zone: UTC+2 (SAST)

Aberfeldy is a small settlement located inside triangle of Phuthaditjhaba, Kestell and Harrismith surrounded by agricultural land and game farms.

The farm Aberfeldy in the Orange Free State had a post office known as Elandsrivierbrug; when the railway reached the farm in 1902 the new Orange River Colony administration preferred "Aberfeldy", Scottish in origin, to the previous Afrikaans name. By 1905 the post office name was Anglicised into Elands River Bridge.

Before colonial encroachment, the area was inhabited by the Basia clan under Chief Mothaha, father of Queen Manthatisi who was married to the Batlokwa.
