= Tseki =

Tseki Mtsekana
- Location within Free State (South African province) Location within South Africa
- Coordinates: 28.581°S 28.774°E
- Country: South Africa
- Province: Free State
- District: Thabo Mofutsanyane
- Municipality: Maluti-a-Phofung
  - Councillor: (ANC)

Area
  - Total: 3.56 km^{2} (1.37 sq mi)

Population (2011)
  - Total: 7,888
  - Density: 2,220/km^{2} (5,740/sq mi)

Racial makeup (2011)
  - Black African: 99.8%
  - Coloured: 0.1%

First languages (2011)
  - Sotho: 94.2%
  - Zulu: 2.0%
  - Sign language: 1.4%
  - Afrikaans: 1.1%
  - Other: 1.3%
- Time zone: UTC+2 (SAST)
- Postal code (street): 9874
- Area code: 058

Tseki is a town in Thabo Mofutsanyane District Municipality in the Free State province of South Africa. It is one of the oldest kasis in Qwaqwa (Phuthaditjhaba). Together with Thaba Bosiu, Bolata, Makwane, Puelong and Thaba Ntsho they were the first places where people settled when Qwaqwa was first formed by the apartheid government.
