= Thibela =

- Location within Free State (South African province) Location within South Africa
- Coordinates: 28.6495°S 28.8576°E
- Country: South Africa
- Province: Free State
- District: Thabo Mofutsanyane
- Municipality: Maluti-a-Phofung
  - Councillor: (ANC)

Area
  - Total: 0.76 km^{2} (0.29 sq mi)

Population (2011)
  - Total: 459
  - Density: 600/km^{2} (1,600/sq mi)

Racial makeup (2011)
  - Black African: 100.0%

First languages (2011)
  - Sotho: 89.1%
  - Afrikaans: 4.4%
  - Zulu: 3.5%
  - English: 3.1%
- Time zone: UTC+2 (SAST)
- Area code: 058

Thibela is a rural village of Maluti-a-Phofung Local Municipality, Thabo Mofutsanyana District Municipality in the Free State province of South Africa.
