= Thaba Tshweu =

Rural village in Free State, South Africa

Coordinates: 28.631°S 28.841°E

Thaba Tshweu is a rural village of Maluti-a-Phofung Local Municipality, Thabo Mofutsanyana District Municipality in the Free State province of South Africa.
