= Tshiame =

- Location within Free State (South African province) Location within South Africa
- Coordinates: 28.2981°S 29.0090°E
- Country: South Africa
- Province: Free State
- District: Thabo Mofutsanyane
- Municipality: Maluti-a-Phofung
  - Councillor: (ANC)

Area
  - Total: 26.05 km^{2} (10.06 sq mi)

Population (2011)
  - Total: 14,856
  - Density: 570.3/km^{2} (1,477/sq mi)

Racial makeup (2011)
  - Black African: 99.4%
  - Coloured: 0.2%
  - Indian/Asian: 0.1%
  - White: 0.1%
  - Other: 0.2%

First languages (2011)
  - Sotho: 55.9%
  - Zulu: 36.1%
  - English: 3.1%
  - Sign language: 1.3%
  - Other: 3.5%
- Time zone: UTC+2 (SAST)
- Area code: 058

Tshiame is a settlement 12 km west of Harrismith in Maluti-a-Phofung Local Municipality, Thabo Mofutsanyana District Municipality in the Free State province of South Africa. It is named after Tshiame Kenneth Mopeli, Chief Minister of the defunct QwaQwa homeland.

The census area includes the QwaQwa industrial sites. The full perimeter of the industrial area is fenced in by modern technology, creating a "see-through wall" of wire mesh standing three metres tall. The fencing-in was done as a security measure, to keep unwanted elements out as a means to curb crime perpetrated in the area.

The settlement borders the N5 national road leading to Durban and the rest of KwaZulu-Natal, and is situated just north of the Sterkfontein Dam, a major water reservoir and the second largest dam by volume in South Africa. The large town of Phuthaditjhaba in the former QwaQwa lies further south of Tshiame.
