= Matsieng, Free State =

Matsieng
- Location within Free State (South African province) Location within South Africa
- Coordinates: 28.591°S 28.809°E
- Country: South Africa
- Province: Free State
- District: Thabo Mofutsanyane
- Municipality: Maluti-a-Phofung

Area
  - Total: 1.71 km^{2} (0.66 sq mi)

Population (2011)
  - Total: 1,680
  - Density: 982/km^{2} (2,540/sq mi)

Racial makeup (2011)
  - Black African: 99.5%
  - Coloured: 0.3%
  - White: 0.1%
  - Other: 0.1%

First languages (2011)
  - Sotho: 90.0%
  - Zulu: 5.2%
  - Sign language: 2.4%
  - Other: 2.4%
- Time zone: UTC+2 (SAST)

Matsieng is a rural village of Maluti-a-Phofung Local Municipality, Thabo Mofutsanyana District Municipality in the Free State province of South Africa.
