= Bolata, Free State =

Bolata
- Location within Free State (South African province) Location within South Africa
- Coordinates: 28.5733°S 28.7981°E
- Country: South Africa
- Province: Free State
- District: Thabo Mofutsanyane
- Municipality: Maluti a Phofung

Area
  - Total: 7.07 km^{2} (2.73 sq mi)

Population (2011)
  - Total: 14,893
  - Density: 2,110/km^{2} (5,460/sq mi)

Racial makeup (2011)
  - Black African: 99.8%
  - Coloured: 0.1%
  - Other: 0.1%

First languages (2011)
  - Sotho: 93.6%
  - Zulu: 2.4%
  - Sign language: 1.6%
  - Other: 2.5%
- Time zone: UTC+2 (SAST)
- PO box: 9869
- Area code: 058

Bolata is a rural village of Maluti-a-Phofung Local Municipality, Thabo Mofutsanyana District Municipality in the Free State province of South Africa.
