= Golden Gate Highlands National Park =

National park in South Africa

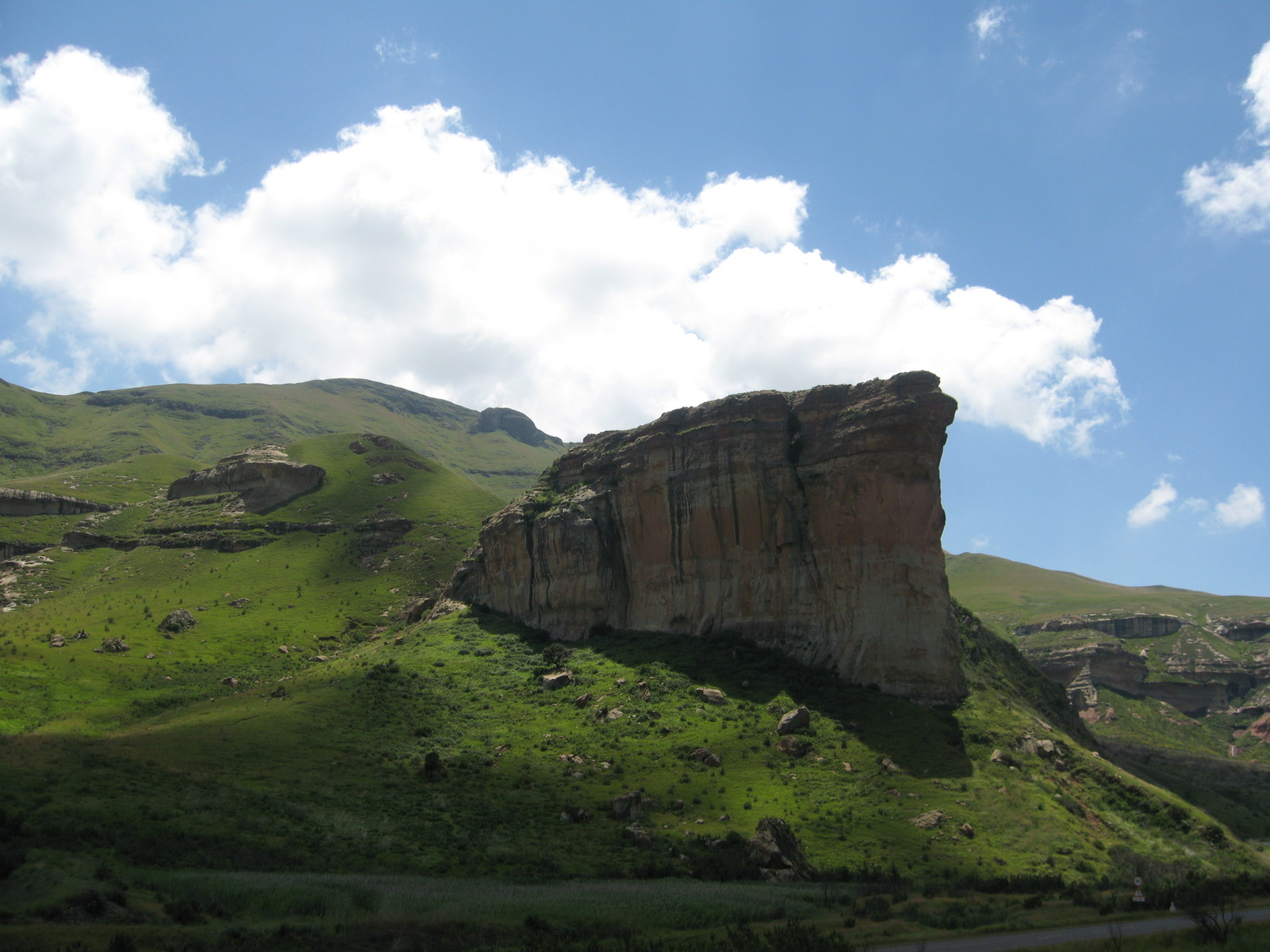
- Brandwag Buttress
- Location of the park
- Location: Free State, South Africa
- Nearest city: Bethlehem
- Coordinates: 28°30′22″S 28°37′0″E
- Area: 326.9 km^{2} (126.2 sq mi)
- Established: 1963
- Governing body: South African National Parks
- Website: www.sanparks.org/parks/golden-gate-highlands
- Golden Gate Highlands National Park (South Africa) Golden Gate Highlands National Park (Free State (South African province))

Golden Gate Highlands National Park is located in Free State, South Africa, near the Lesotho border. It covers an area of 327 km^{2} (126 sq mi). The park's most notable features are its golden, ochre, and orange-hued, deeply eroded sandstone cliffs and outcrops, especially the Brandwag rock. Another feature of the area is the numerous caves and shelters displaying San rock paintings. Wildlife featured at the park includes mongooses, eland, zebras, and over 100 bird species. Numerous palaeontology finds have been made in the park, including dinosaur eggs and skeletons.

== History ==
In 1963, 47.92 km^{2} (11,840 acres) was proclaimed as a national park, specifically to preserve the scenic beauty of the area. In 1983, the park was enlarged to 62.41 km^{2} (15,420 acres), and in 1988, it was enlarged to 116.33 km^{2} (28,750 acres), forming the core western portion of the national park.

In 1992, 220 km^{2} (54,000 acres) comprising 95 farms in the QwaQwa Bantustan immediately to the east of the Golden Gate Highlands National Park was proclaimed as the QwaQwa National Park, and managed by the Highlands Development Corporation. Conflict between the Park management and community members who were former farm labourers and their descendants, arose when no formal recognition was made of the cultural and economic relevance of the land occupied by the residents, including pressure to reduce domestic animal stocks, decrease their use of water and the harvesting of indigenous medicinal plants, and relocate ancestral grave sites.

Following the dissolution of QwaQwa in 1994 during South Africa's transition to democracy, it was agreed that the fences between QwaQwa National Park and Golden Gate Highlands National Park would be dismantled, and in 2004, it announced was that the QwaQwa National Park would be incorporated into the Golden Gate Highlands National Park. The amalgamation was completed in 2007, increasing the National Park's area to 326.9 km^{2} (80,800 acres). The conflict with former QwaQwa National Park residents was largely resolved through the institution of land claims between 1998 and 2008, with an initial settlement reached in 2015, and land transferred to the beneficiaries by 2025, alongside ongoing authorisation for community members to access the land for limited grazing and medicinal plant harvesting, as well as cultural and spiritual practices.

Since 2001, the national park has formed part of the Maloti-Drakensberg Transfrontier Conservation Area, Peace Park.

== Geography and climate ==
The park is 320 km (200 mi) from Johannesburg and is close to the villages of Clarens and Kestell, in the upper regions of the Little Caledon River. The park is situated in the Rooiberge of the eastern Free State, in the foothills of the Maluti Mountains. The Caledon River forms the southern boundary of the park, as well as the border between the Free State and Lesotho. The elevation ranges from 1,646 m (5,400 ft) in the Maluti-a-Phofung valley to the highest peak in the park (and also in the Free State) is Ribbokkop at 2,829 m (9,281 ft) above sea level.

"Golden Gate" refers to the sandstone cliffs found on either side of the valley at the Golden Gate dam. In 1875, a farmer called J.N.R. van Reenen and his wife stopped here as they travelled to their new farm in Vuurland. He named the location "Golden Gate" when he saw the last rays of the setting sun fall on the cliffs.

The park is located in the eastern highveld region of South Africa and experiences a dry, sunny climate from June to August. Summers are warm with temperatures averaging 26 °C. It has showers, hail, and thunderstorms between October and April, and an annual rainfall of 760 mm (30 in) per year. Winters, from May to October, are dry and cold with temperatures dropping to 13 °C (55 °F). Thick frost is common in the region during the winter months, and snowfall can occur in mid winter due to the altitude.

== Vegetation ==
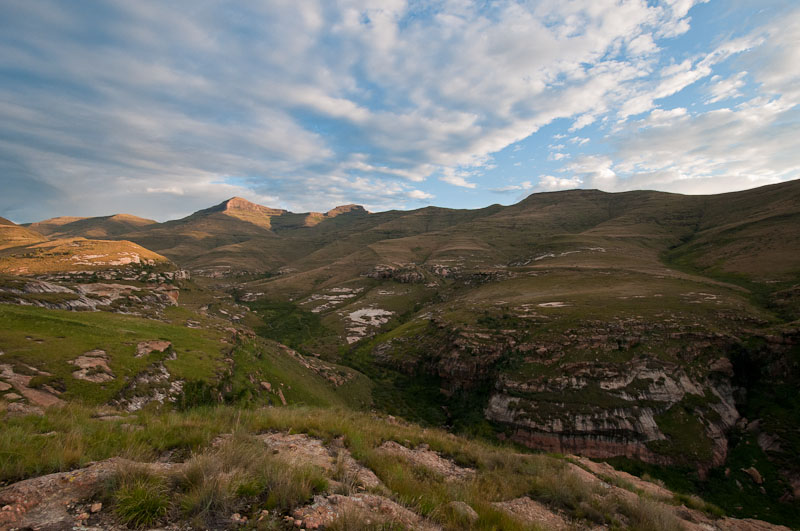
Sunset over the Ribbokspruit valley

The park is in the highveld region with the Lesotho highlands in the south. The vegetation comprises species of the Grassland biome. The park has more than 60 grass species and a large variety of bulbs and herbs.Many species of flora found in the park are endemic.

The park also has Afromontane forests and high-altitude Austro-Afro alpine grassland, which is scarce in South Africa. The oldwood (Leucosidea sericea), an evergreen species, is a common tree in the park. It is a favourite habitat of beetles and 117 species occur on these trees in the park.

The Lombardi poplars and weeping willows in the park are introduced species, but are kept because of their cultural and historic connection with the eastern Free State. Other exotic species in the park, for example wattle and bluegum, are systematically eradicated.

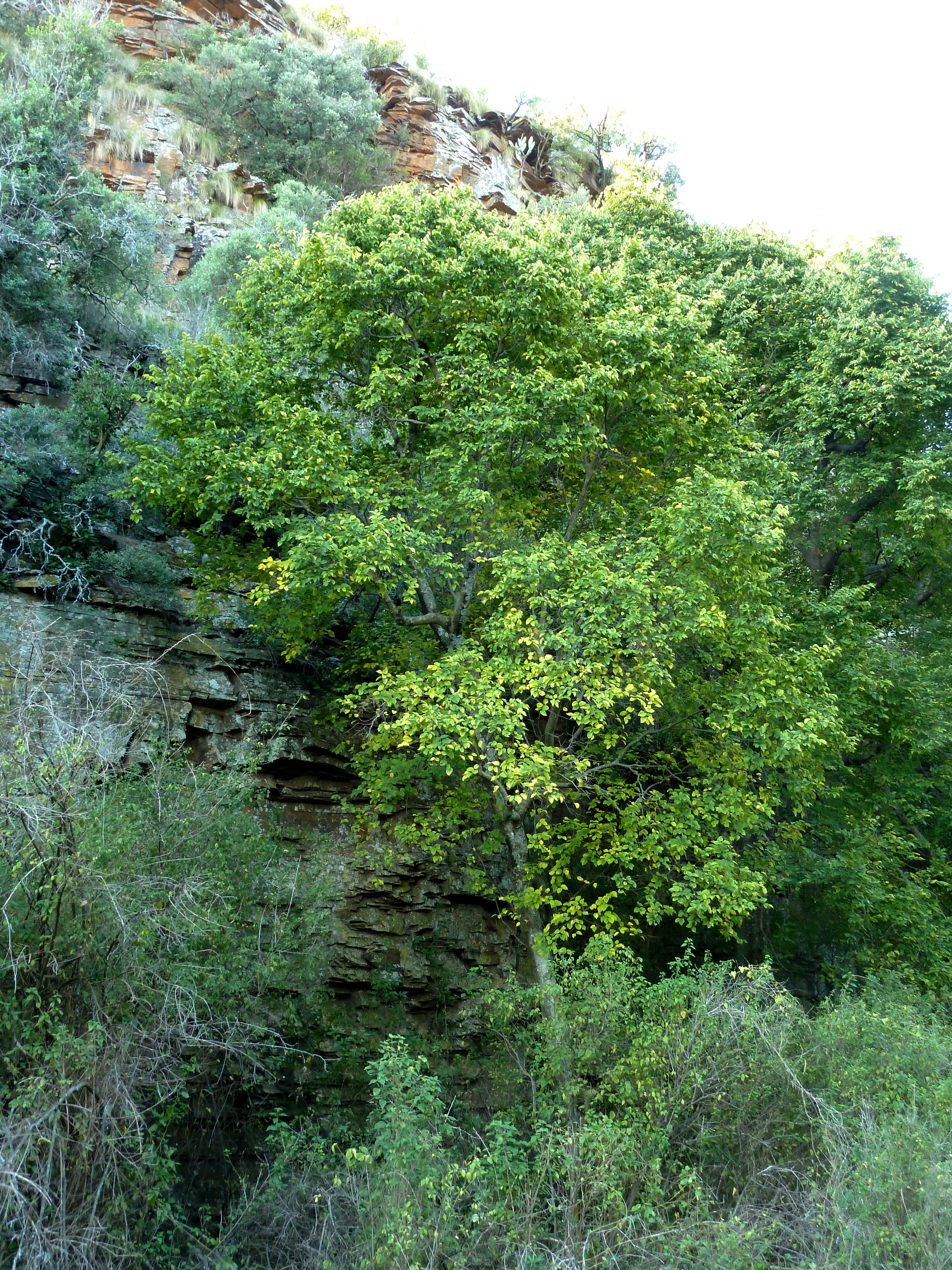
White Stinkwood

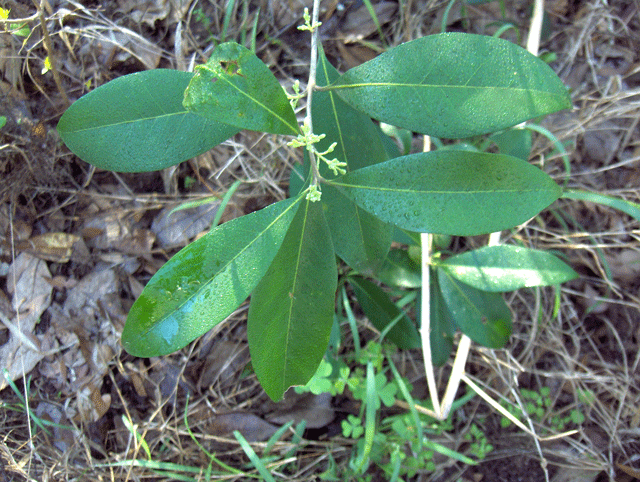
Wild Olive leaves

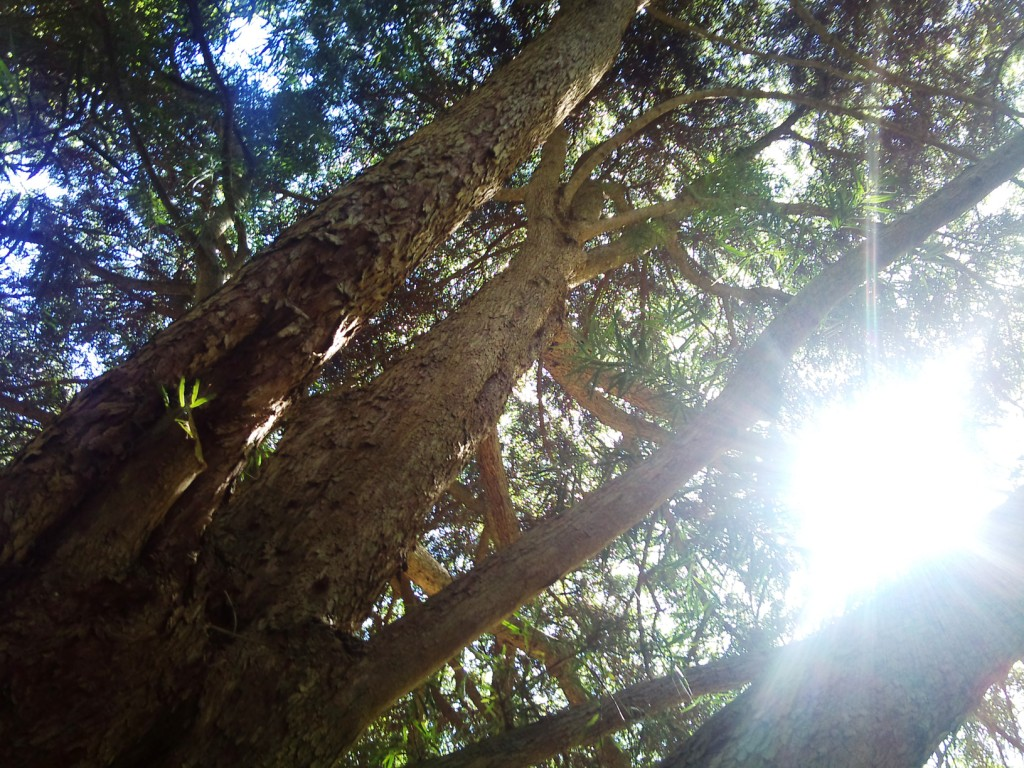
Yellowwood Tree

== Wildlife ==
There is a large variety of mammals found in the reserve, namely Springbok, Burchell's zebra, Eland, Black Wildebeest, Blesbok, and Red Hartebeest. The bird life is equally diverse, and the park is a breeding ground to the endangered Cape Vulture. In addition, there are numerous species of reptiles and insects.

Instead of reintroducing one of the "big five" into the park, the sungazer lizard and water mongoose were reintroduced. Twelve species of mice, 10 species of carnivores, and 10 antelope species have been recorded in the park. The grey rhebok and the mountain reedbuck were present when the park was established.

=== Mammals ===
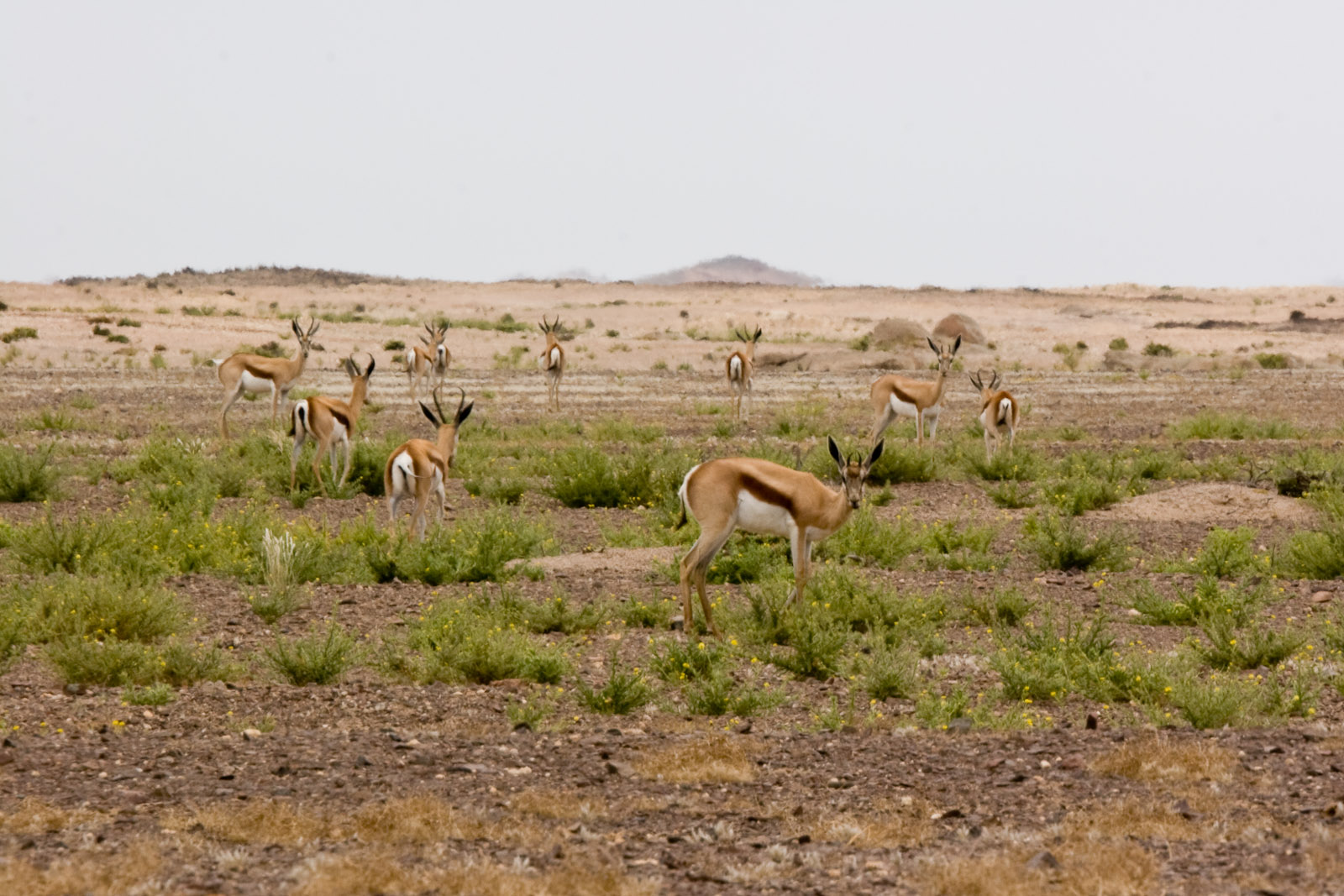
Springbok

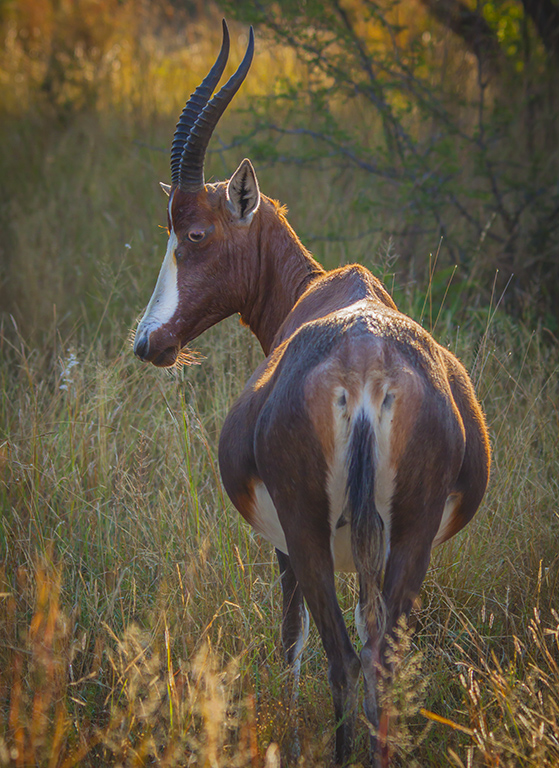
Blesbuck

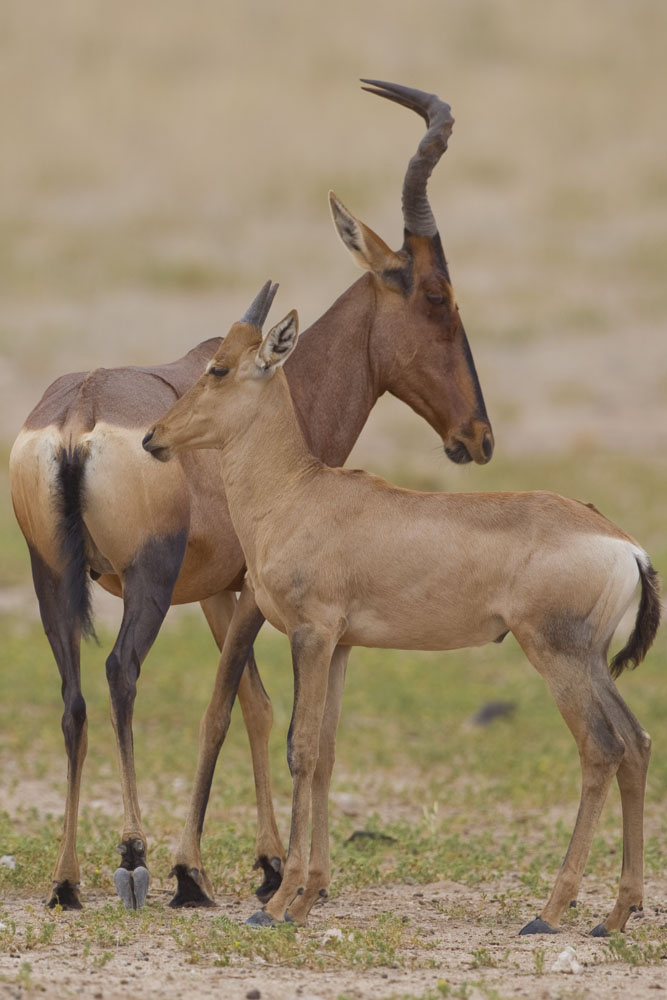
Red Hartebees

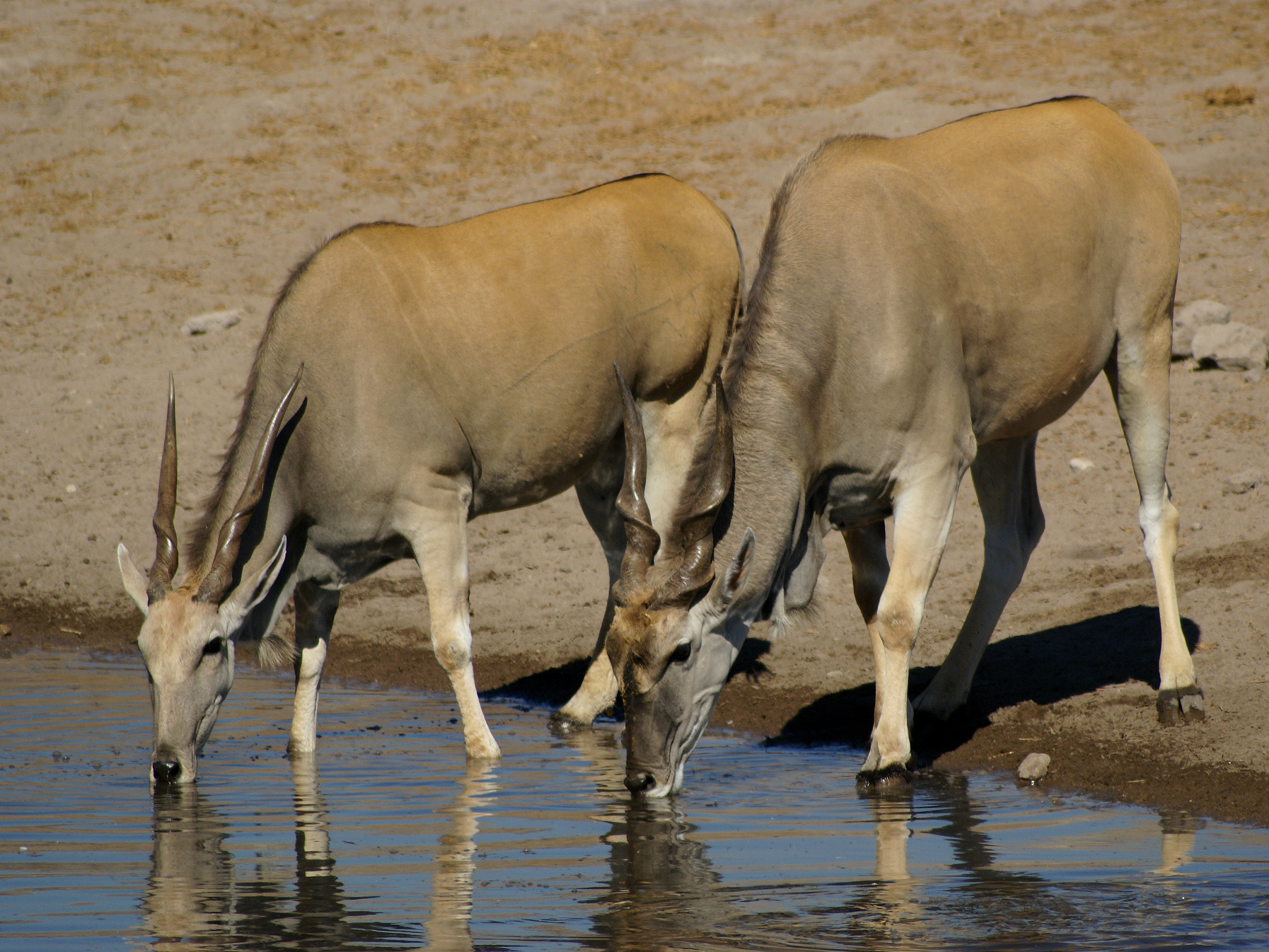
Eland

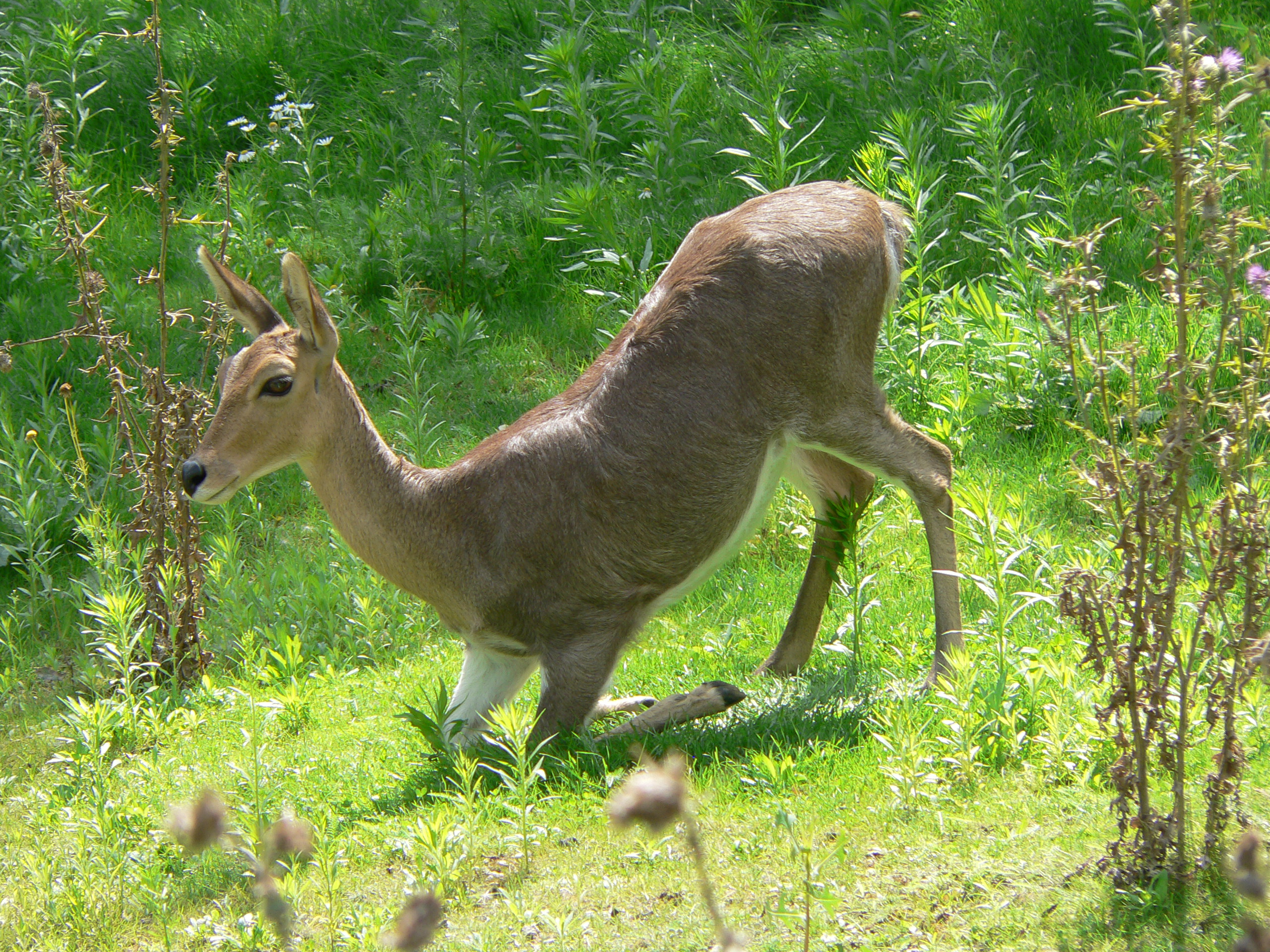
Mountain reedbuck

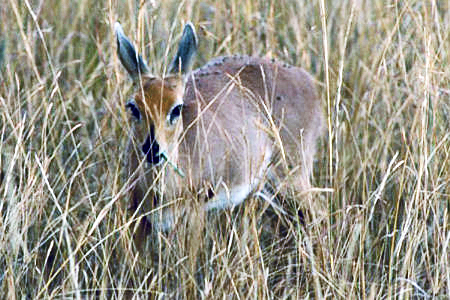
Oribi

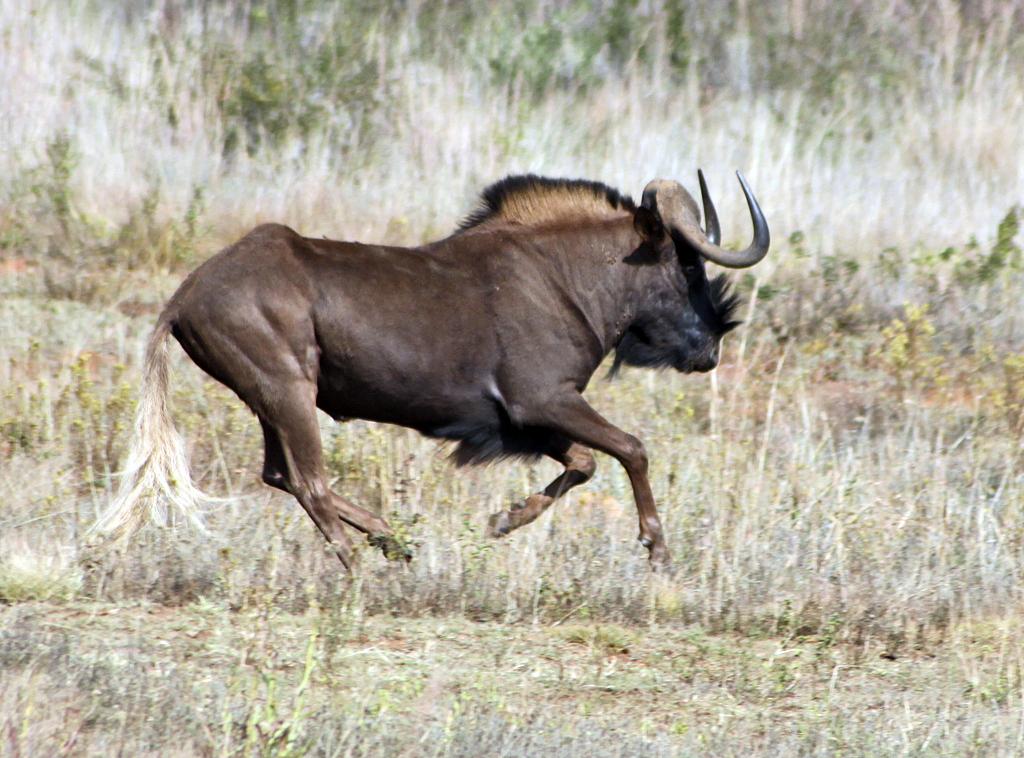
Black wildebeest

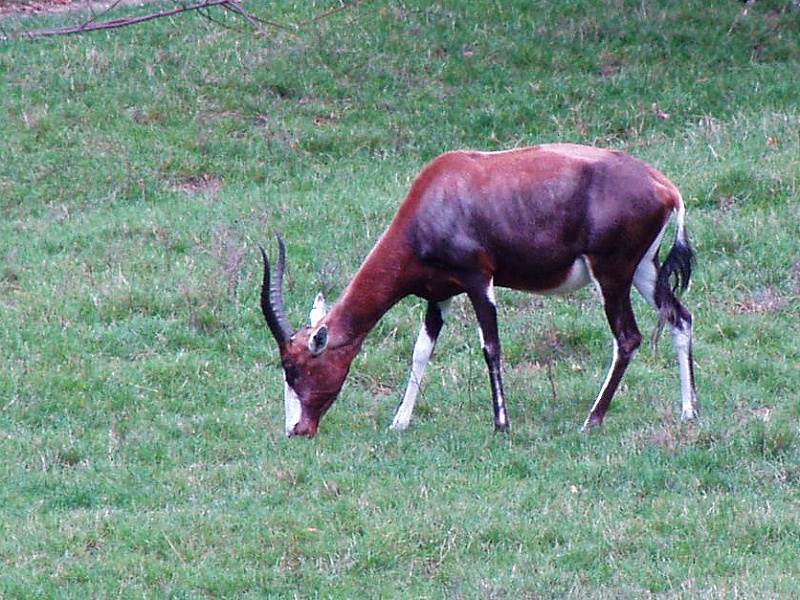
Blesbok

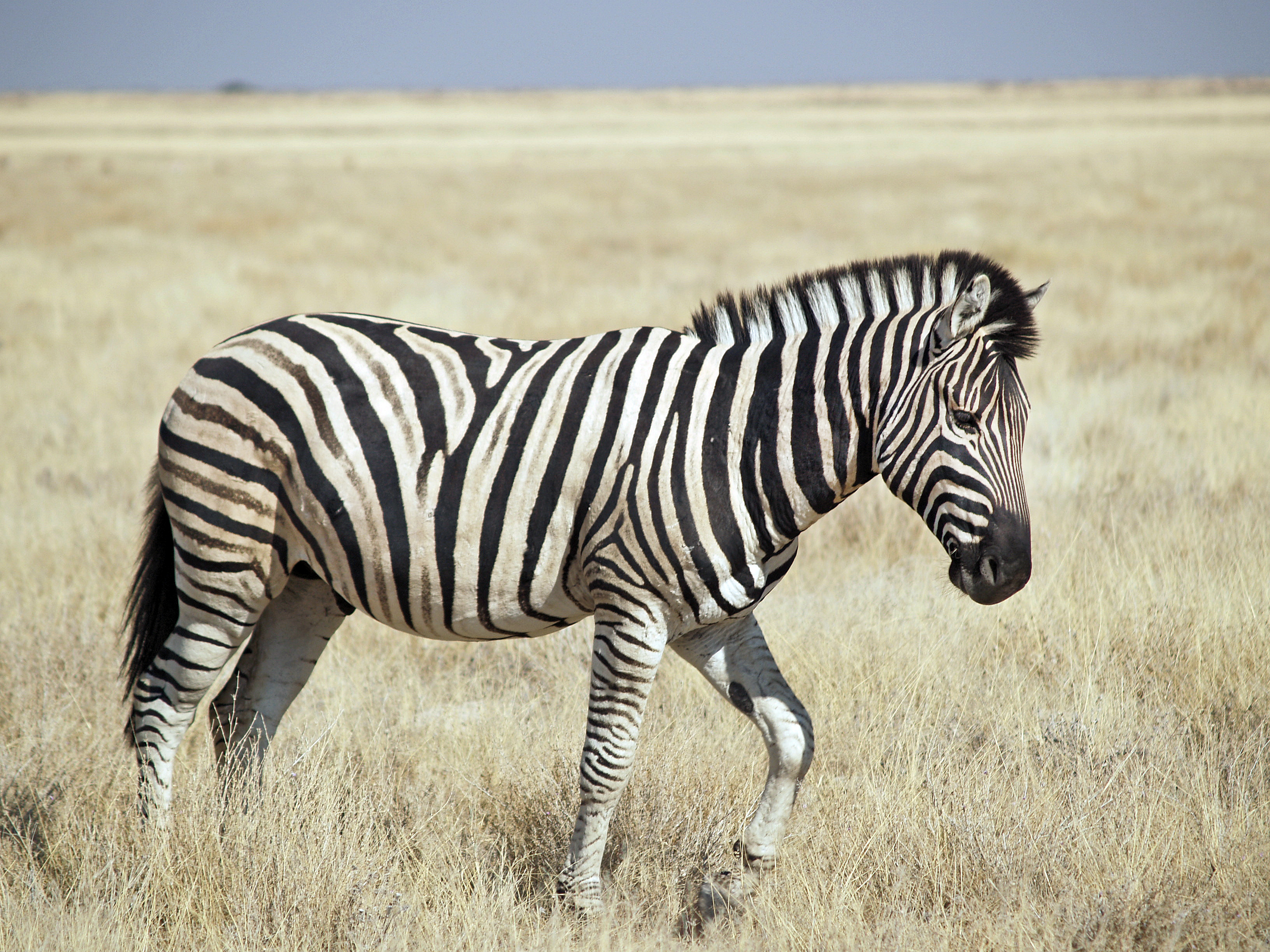
Burchell's zebra

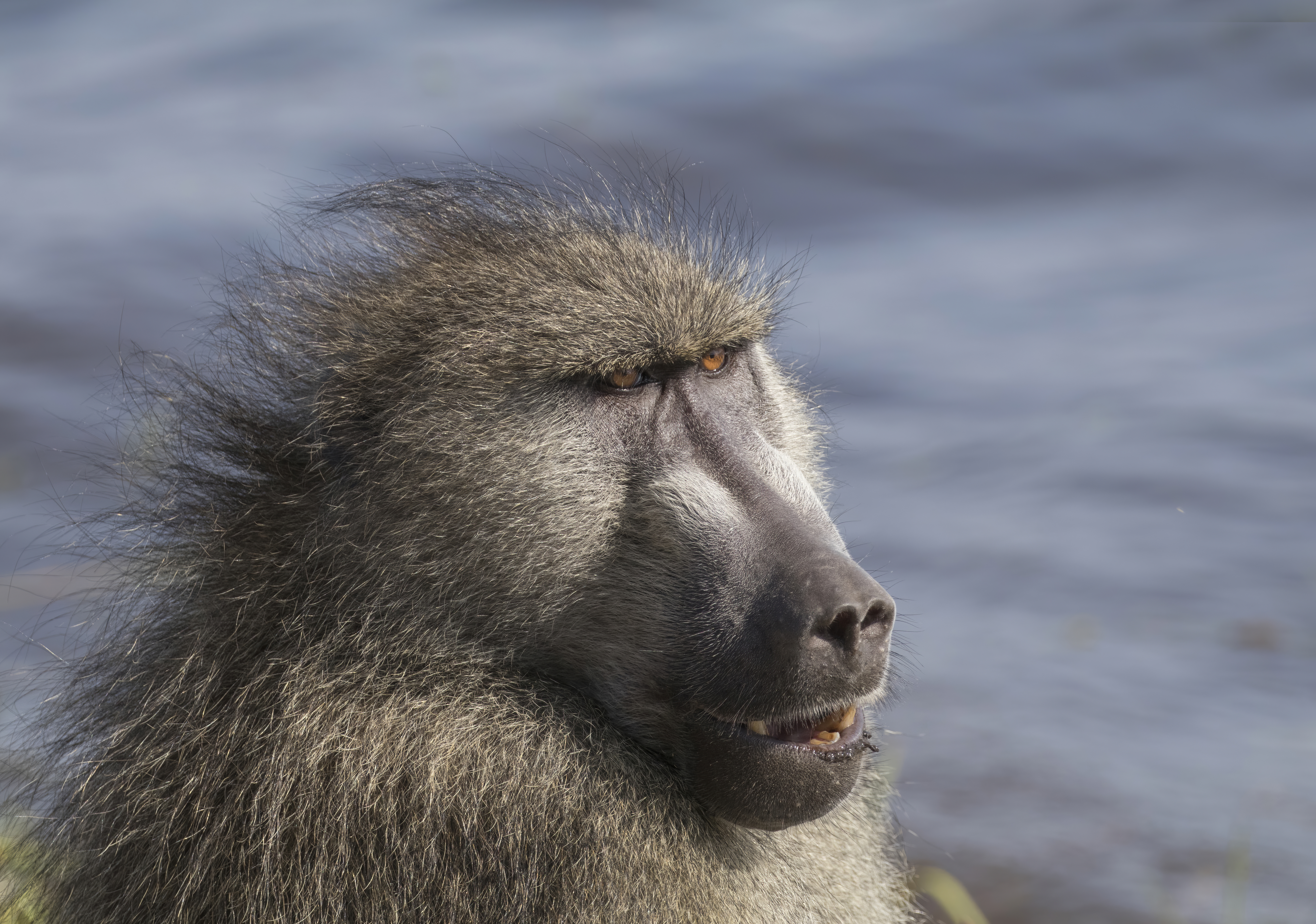
Chacma baboon

=== Birds ===
Over 210 bird species have been observed in the park, including the rare bearded vulture and the endangered Cape vulture and bald ibis.

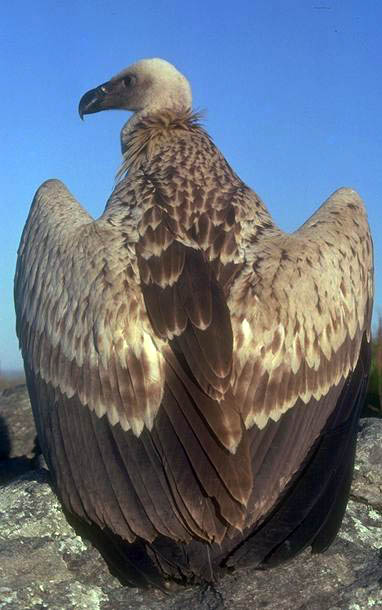
Cape vulture

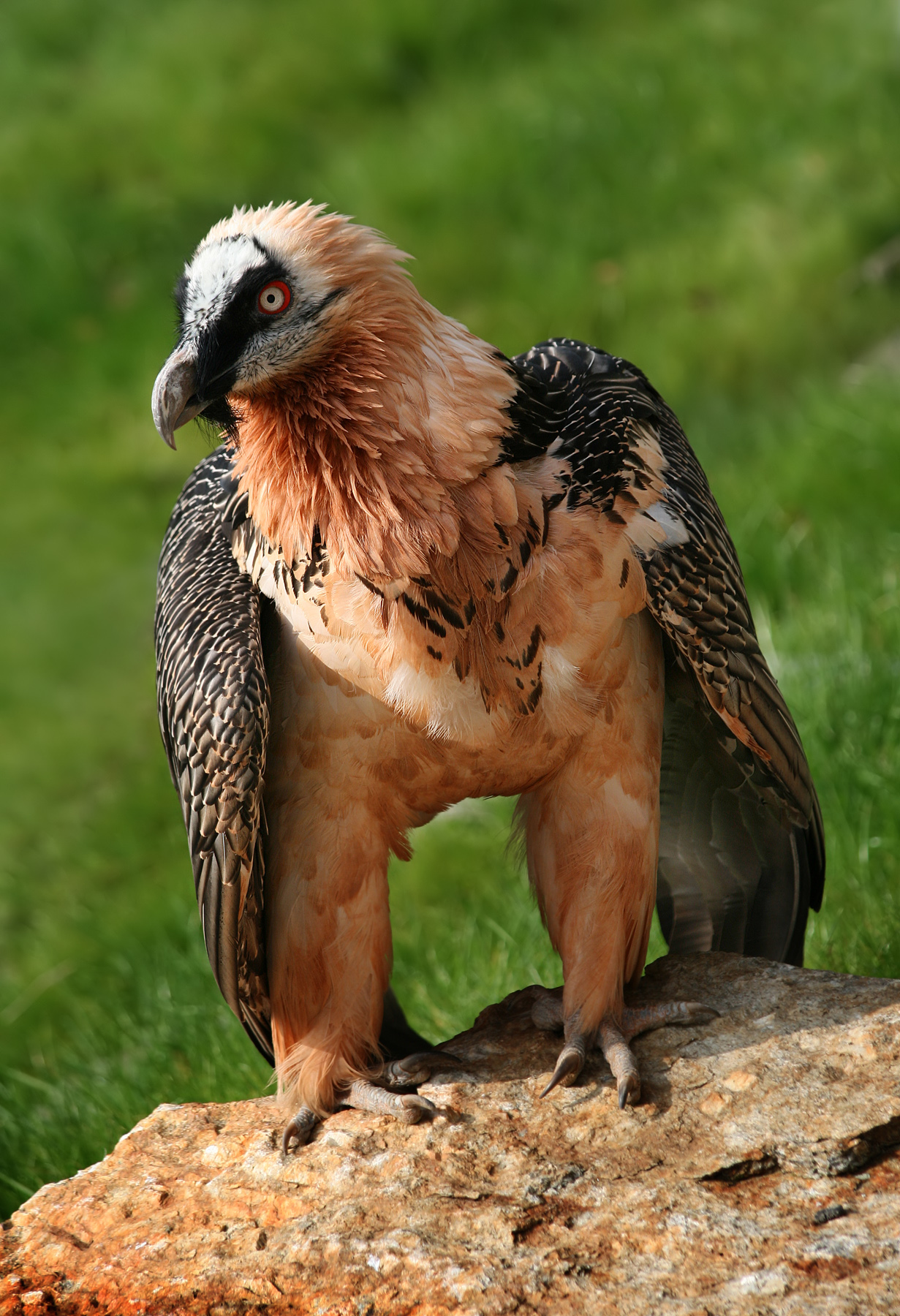
Bearded vulture

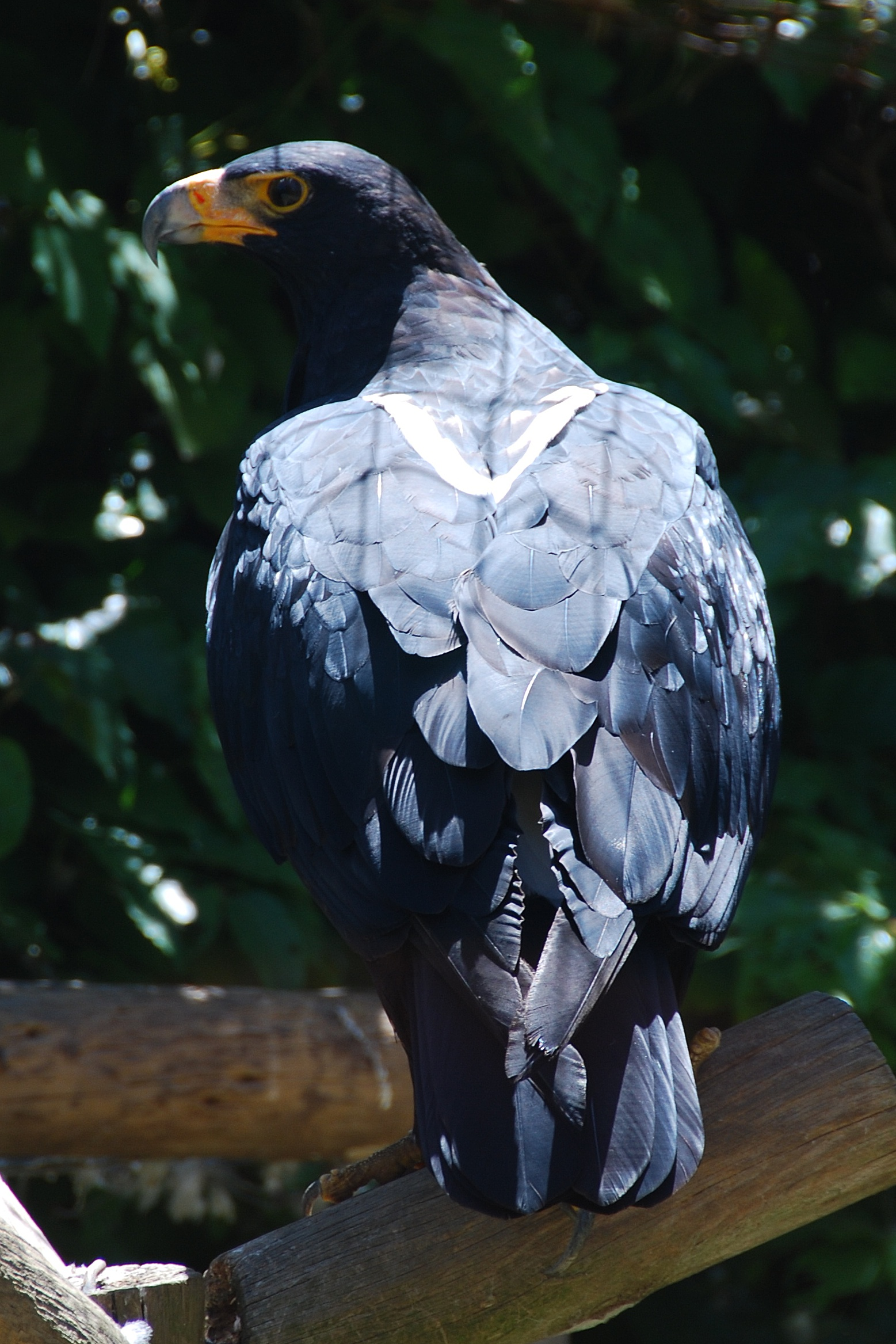
Verreaux's eagle

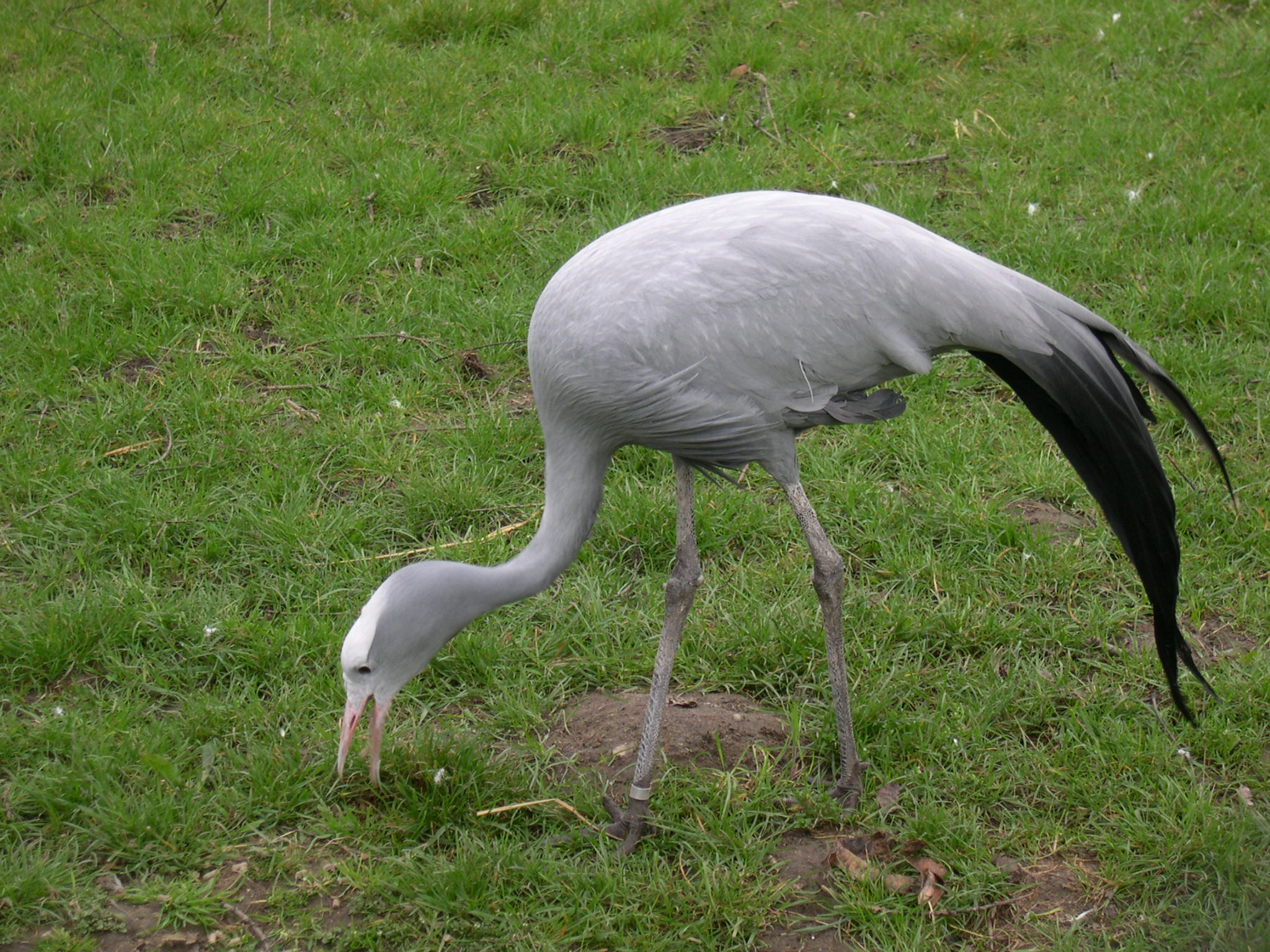
Blue crane

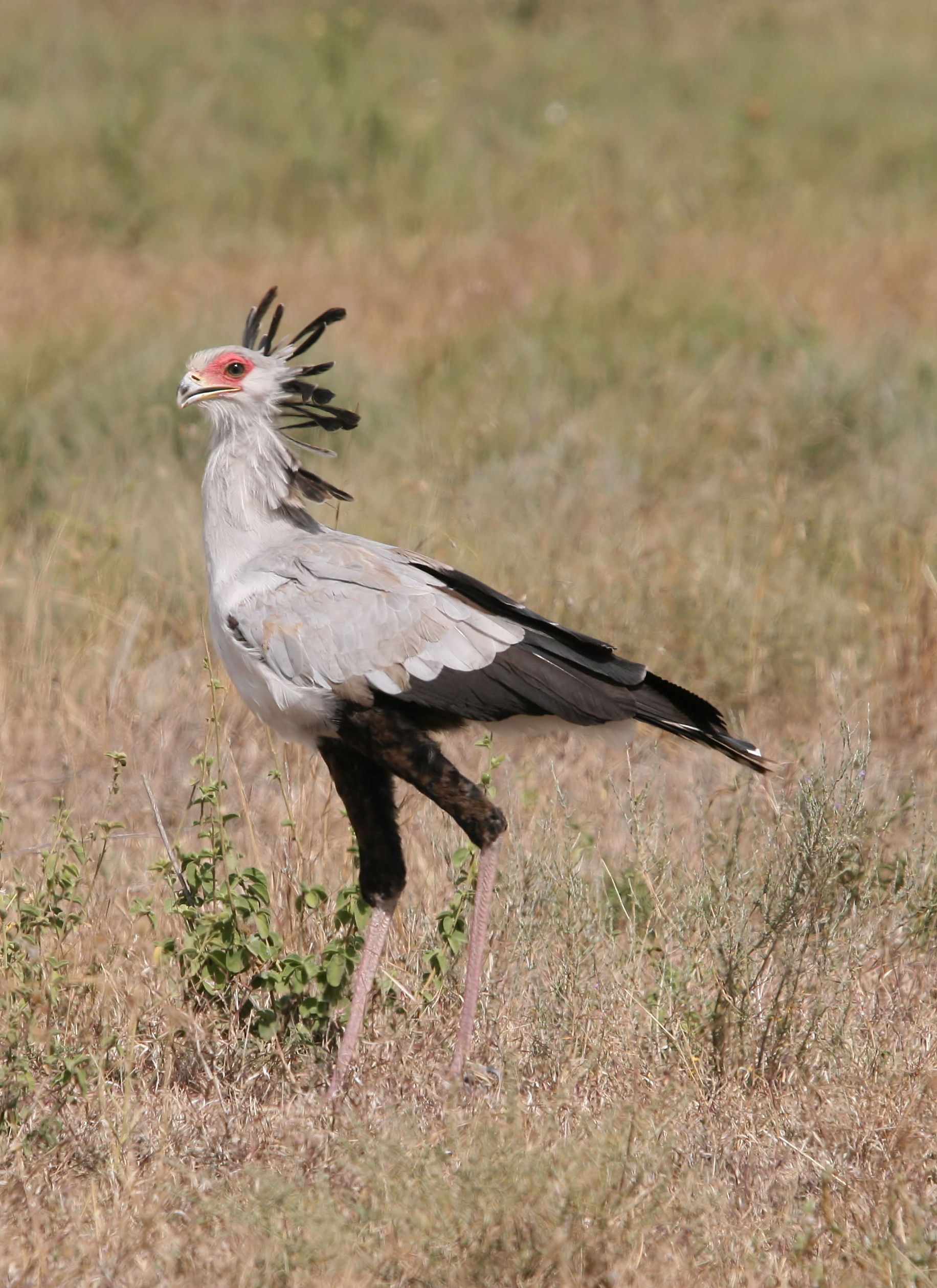
Secretary bird

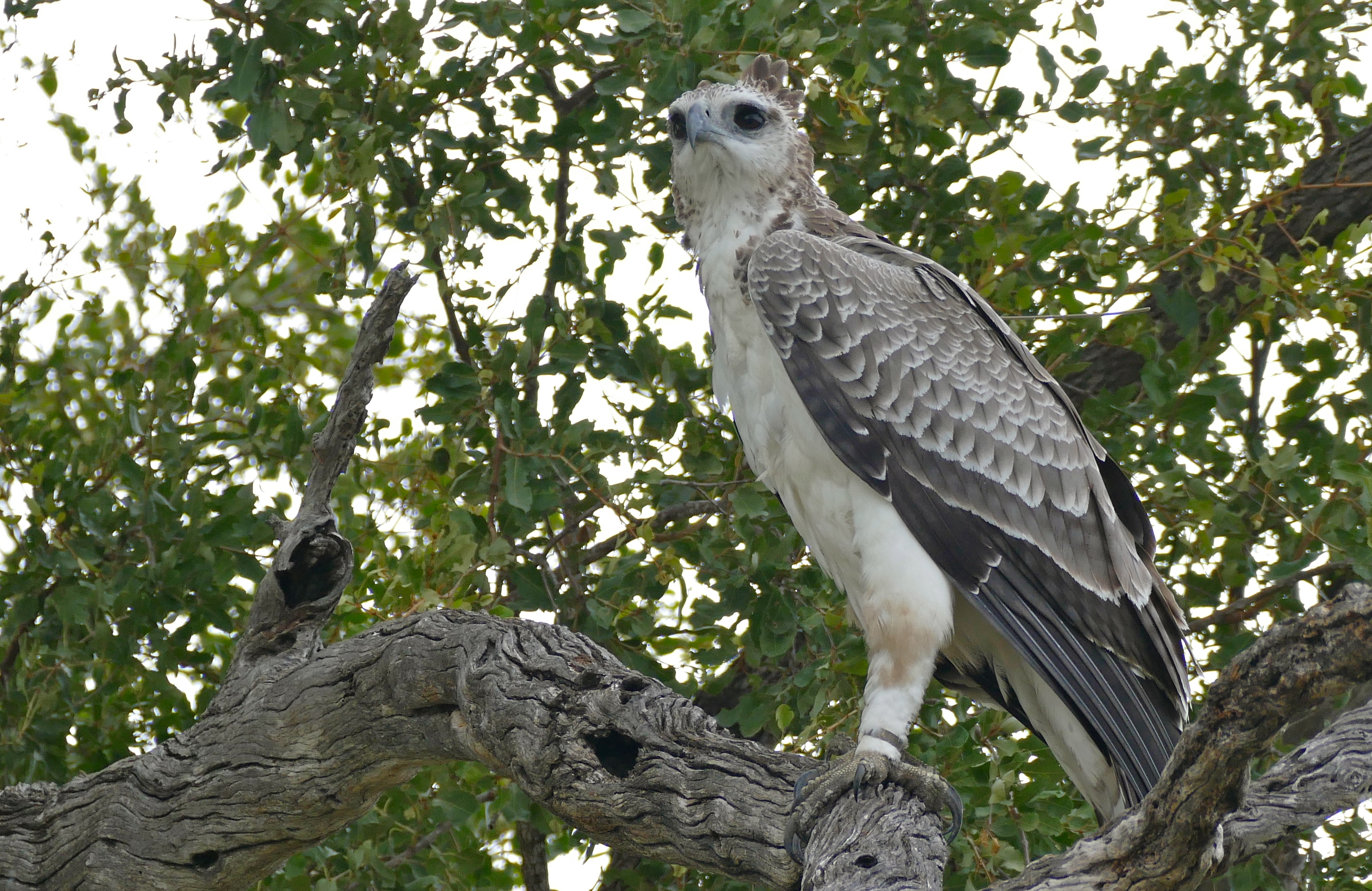
Martial Eagle

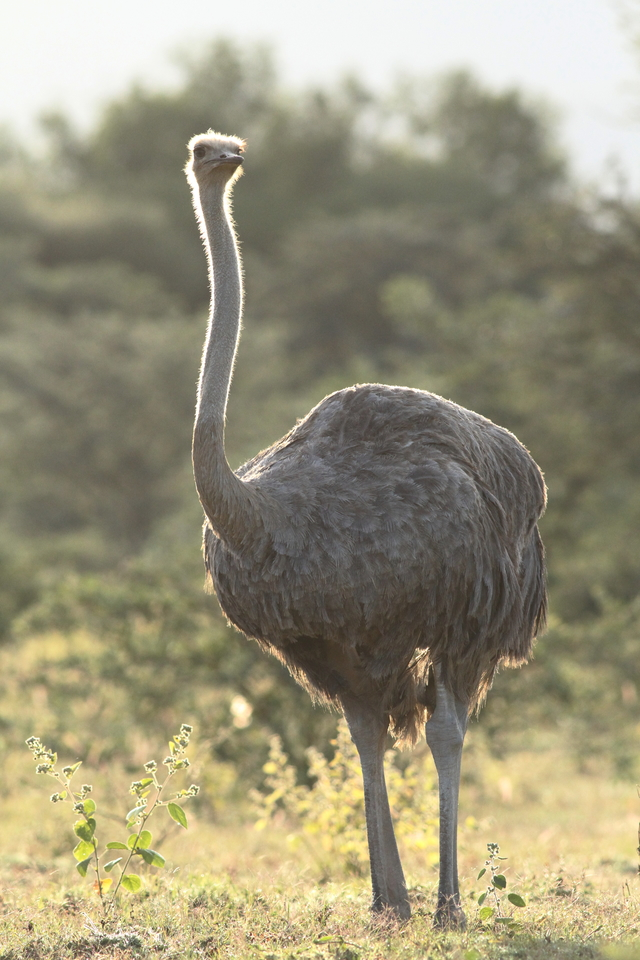
Common Ostrich

=== Snakes and fishes ===
Seven snake species, including the puff adder, mountain adder, and rinkhals, are found in the park.

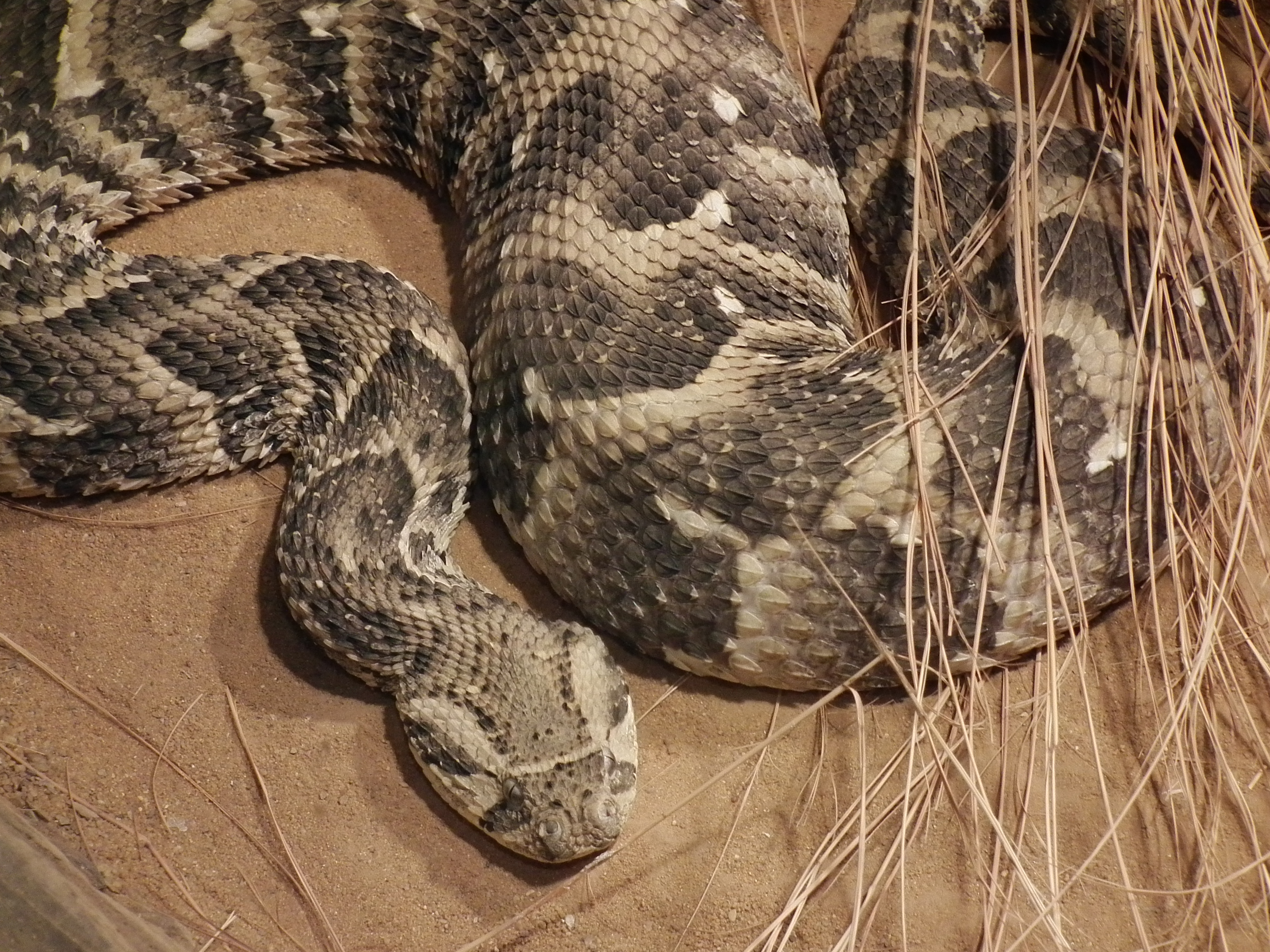
Puff adder

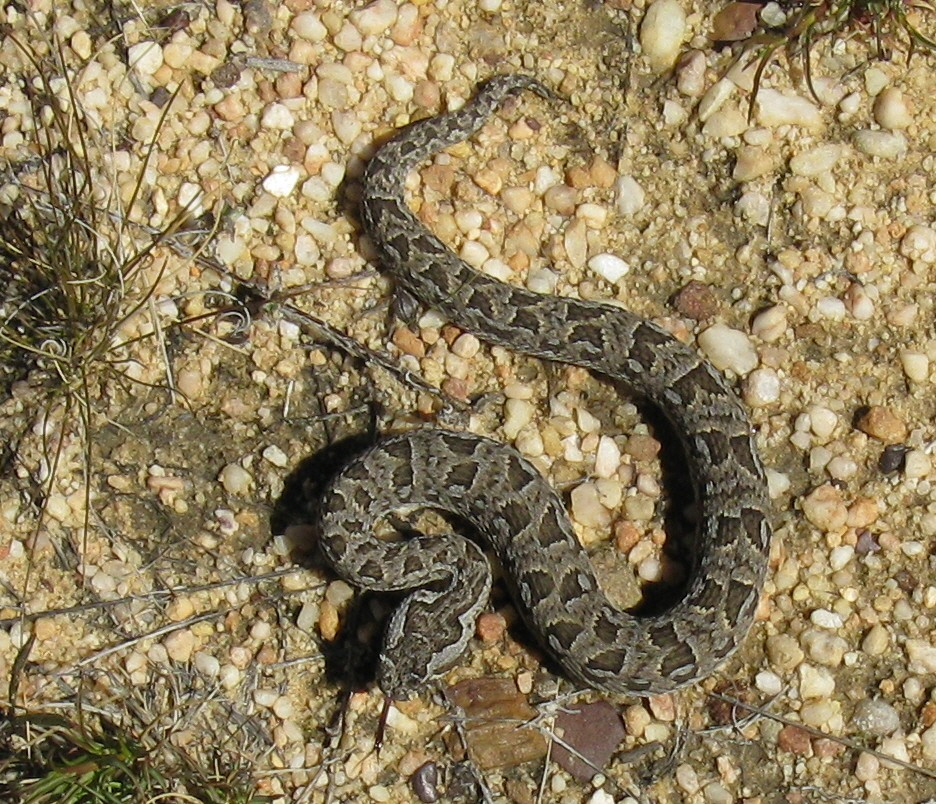
Mountain adder

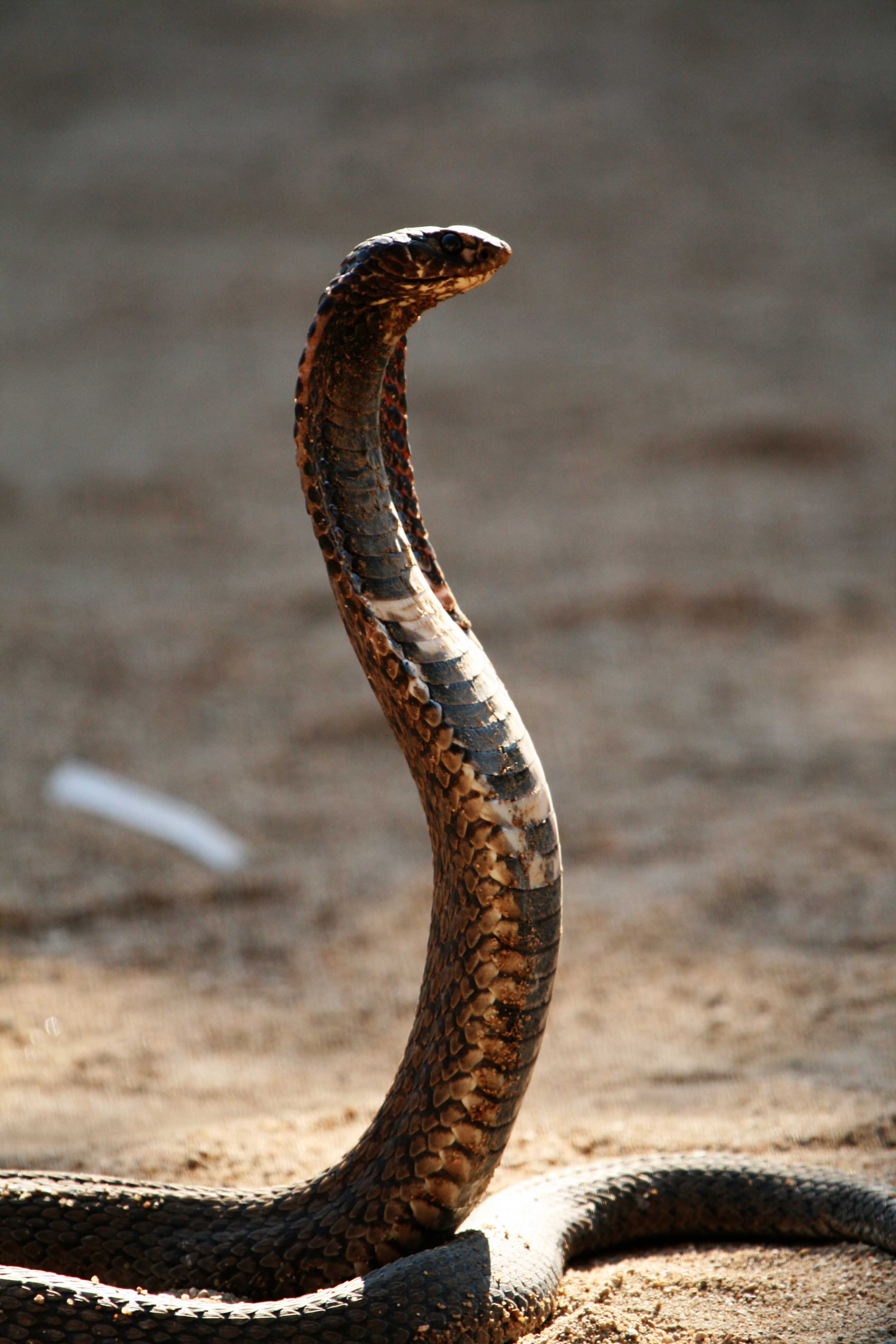
Rinkhals

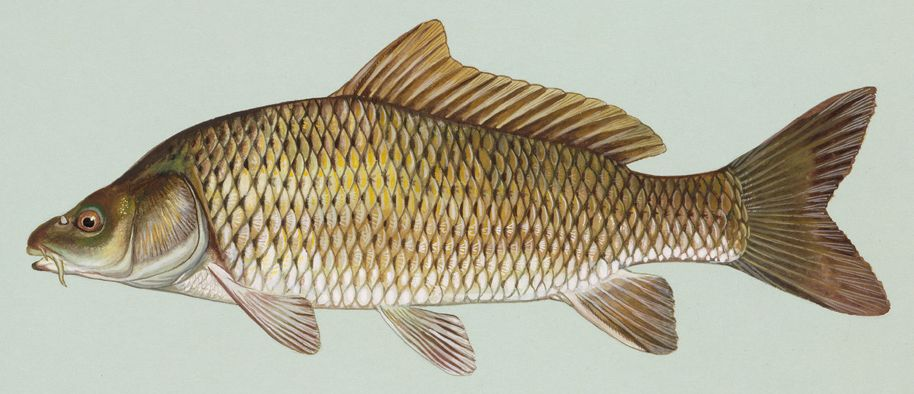
Carp

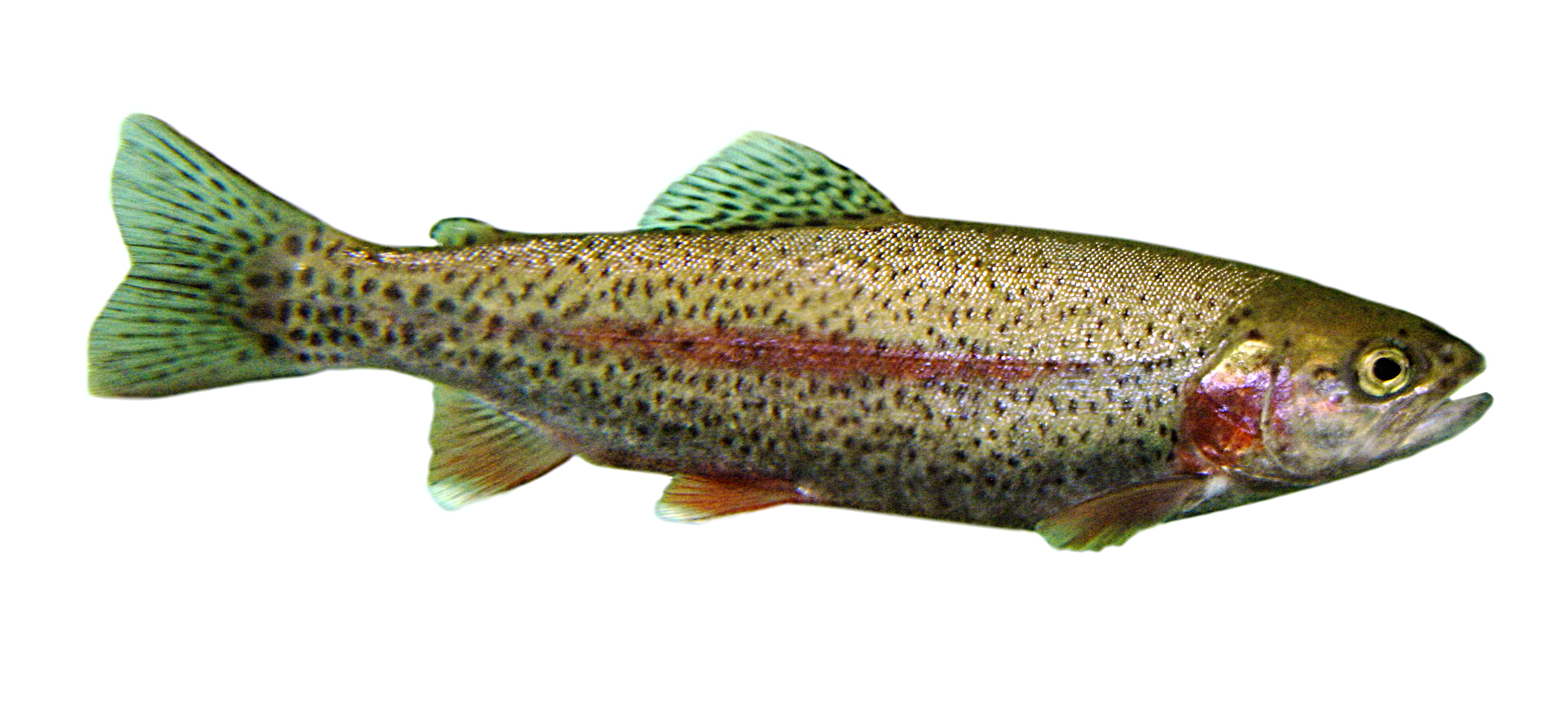
Rainbow trout

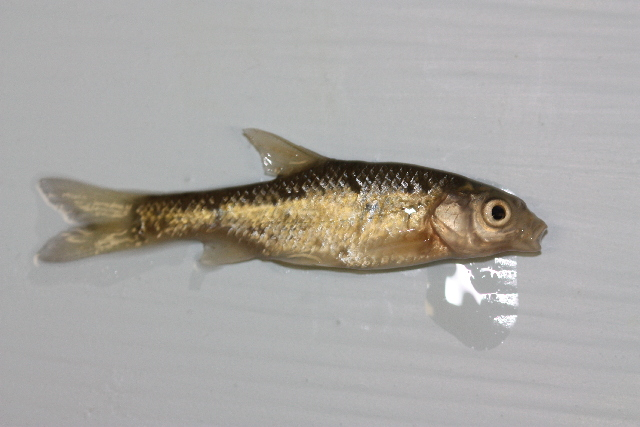
Chubbyhead barb

== Geology and palaeontology ==
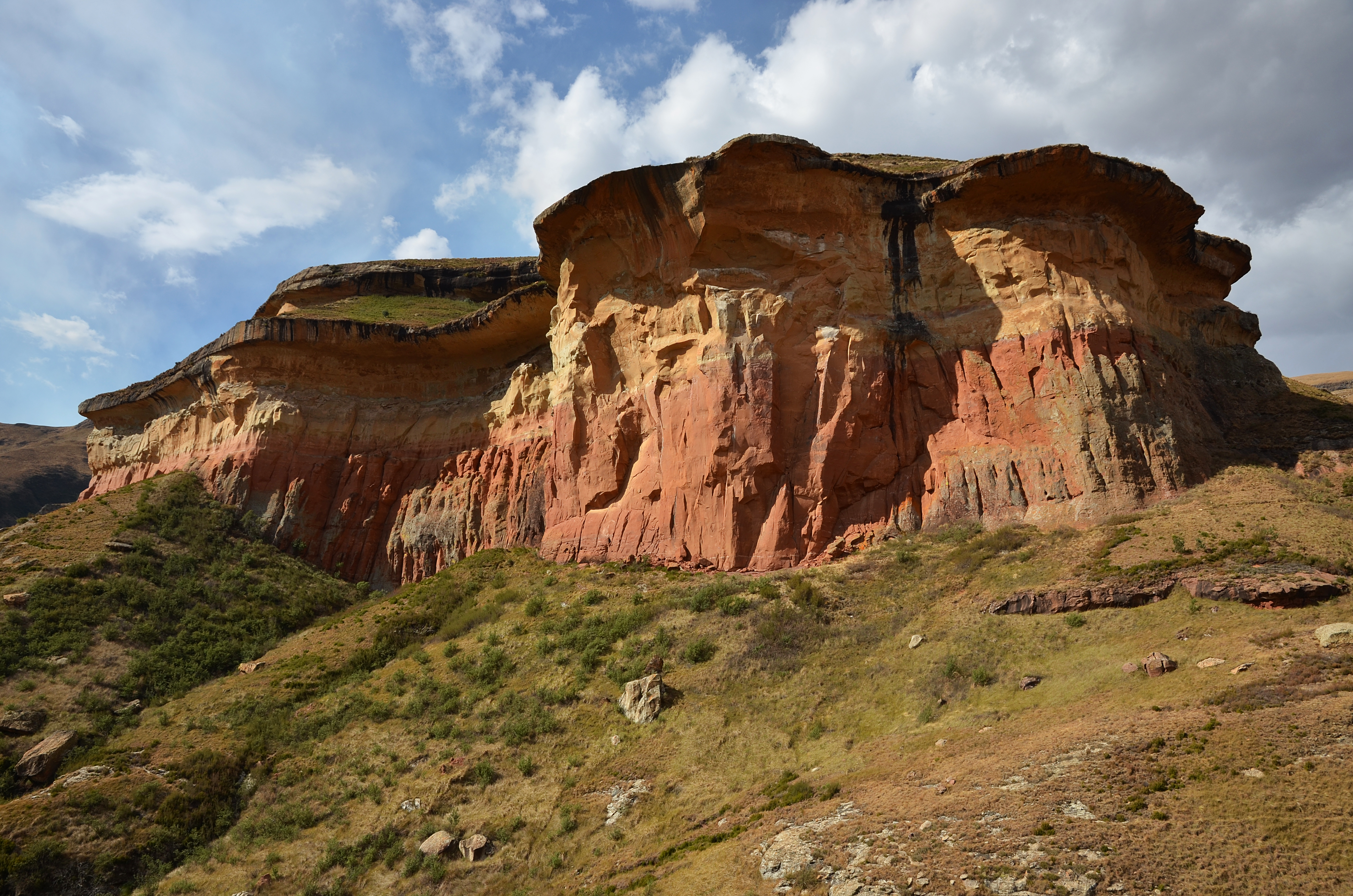
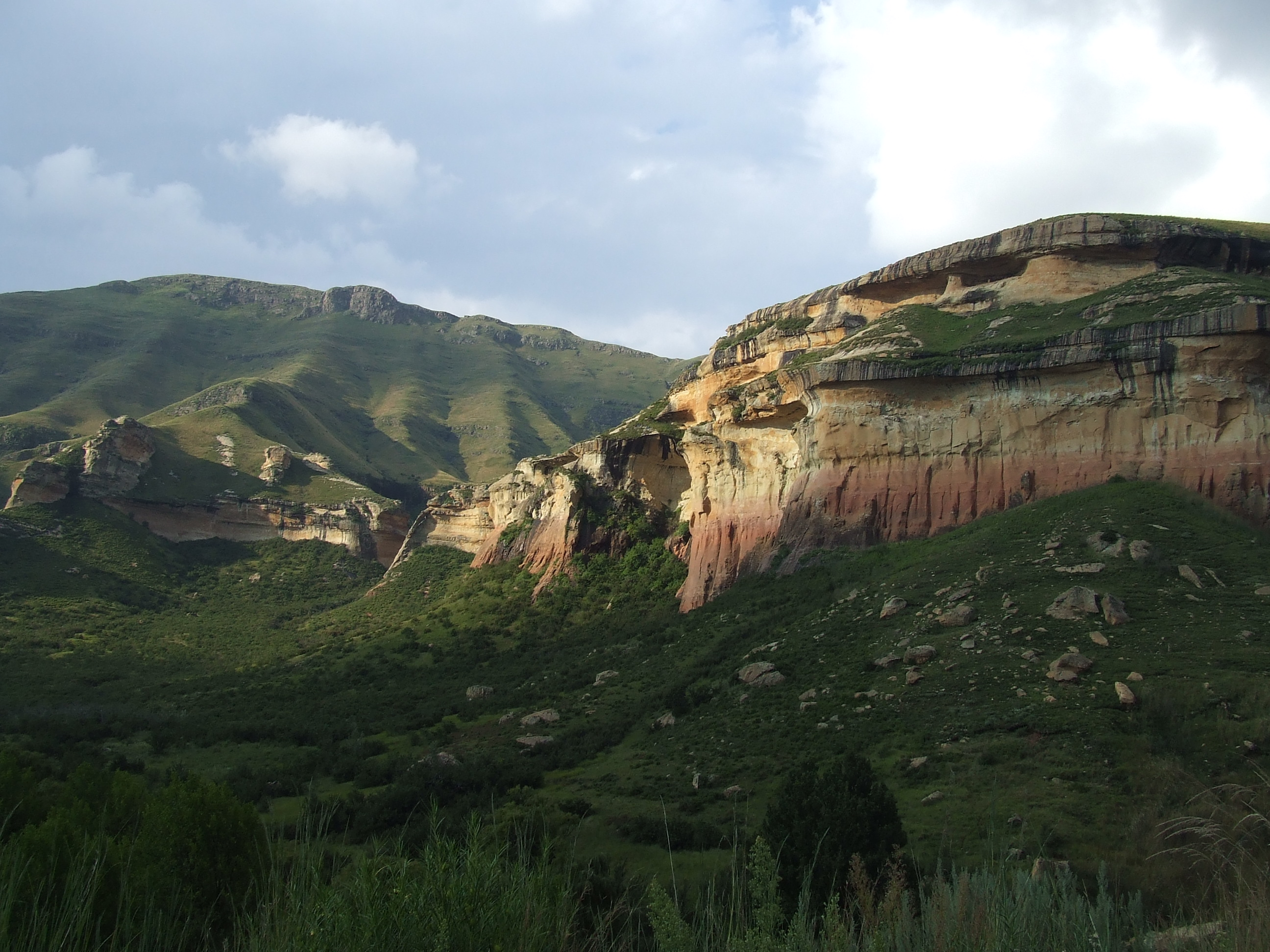
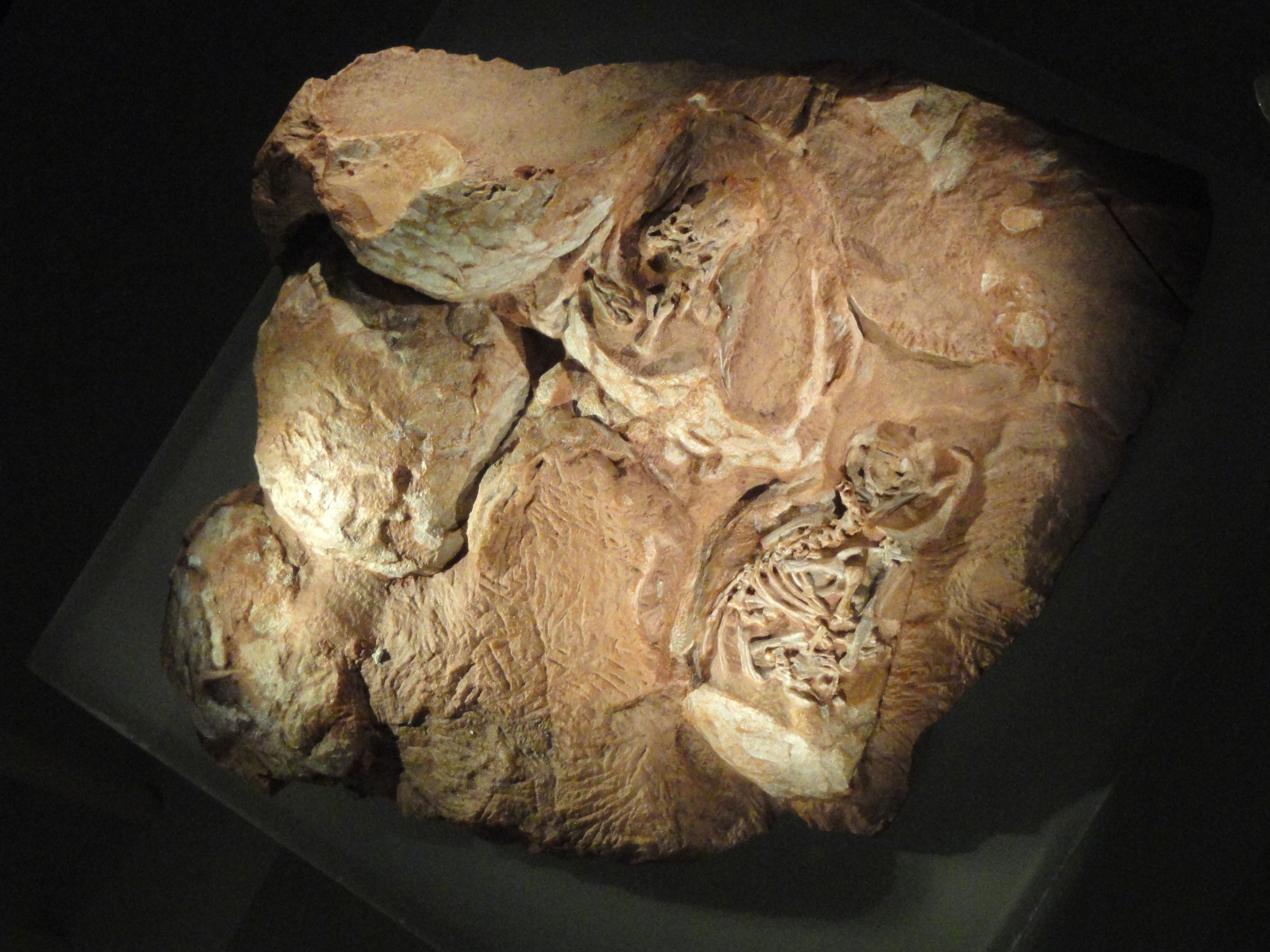

The geology of the park provides very visual "textbook" examples of Southern Africa's geological history. The sandstone formations in the park form the upper part of the Karoo Supergroup. These formations were deposited during a period of aeolian deposition towards the end of the Triassic Period. At the time of deposition, the climate of the area the park covers was becoming progressively drier until arid desert conditions set in, resulting in a land of dunes and sandy desert, with occasional scattered oases. The deposition of the sandstones ended when lava flowed out over the desert 190 million years ago.

The following sequence of geological formations is visible in the park (starting from the bottom): the Molteno Formation, Elliott Formation, Clarens Formation, and Drakensberg Formation. The yellow-brown Golden Gate and Brandwag cliffs are made up of the Clarens formation. The layers in this formation are 140 to 160 m (460 to 520 ft) thick. The Drakensberg Formation comprises the basaltic lava that flowed over the desert. It forms the mountain summits in the park. On Ribbokkop, it is 600 m (2,000 ft) thick. The Elliot Formation is a red mudstone where many dinosaur fossils have been found.

The oldest dinosaur embryos ever discovered were found in the park in 1978. The eggs were from the Triassic Period (220 to 195 million years ago) and had fossilised foetal skeletons of Massospondylus, a prosauropod dinosaur. More examples of these eggs have since been found in the park. Other fossils found in the park include those of advanced cynodontia (canine toothed animals), small thecodontia (animals with teeth set firmly in the jaw), and bird-like and crocodile-like dinosaurs.

== Accommodation ==
Accommodation in the park is available at Glen Reenen and Brandwag Rest camps. Caravan and campsites with all amenities are available at Glen Reenen camp. The hotel was formerly part of the Brandwag camp, but since its recent refurbishment, it is managed separately by SANParks as Golden Gate Hotel. The nearest town to Golden Gate Highlands National Park is Clarens (17 km to the west), but Phuthaditjhaba is also easily reached by a good tar road, driving through the access gate to the east of the park.

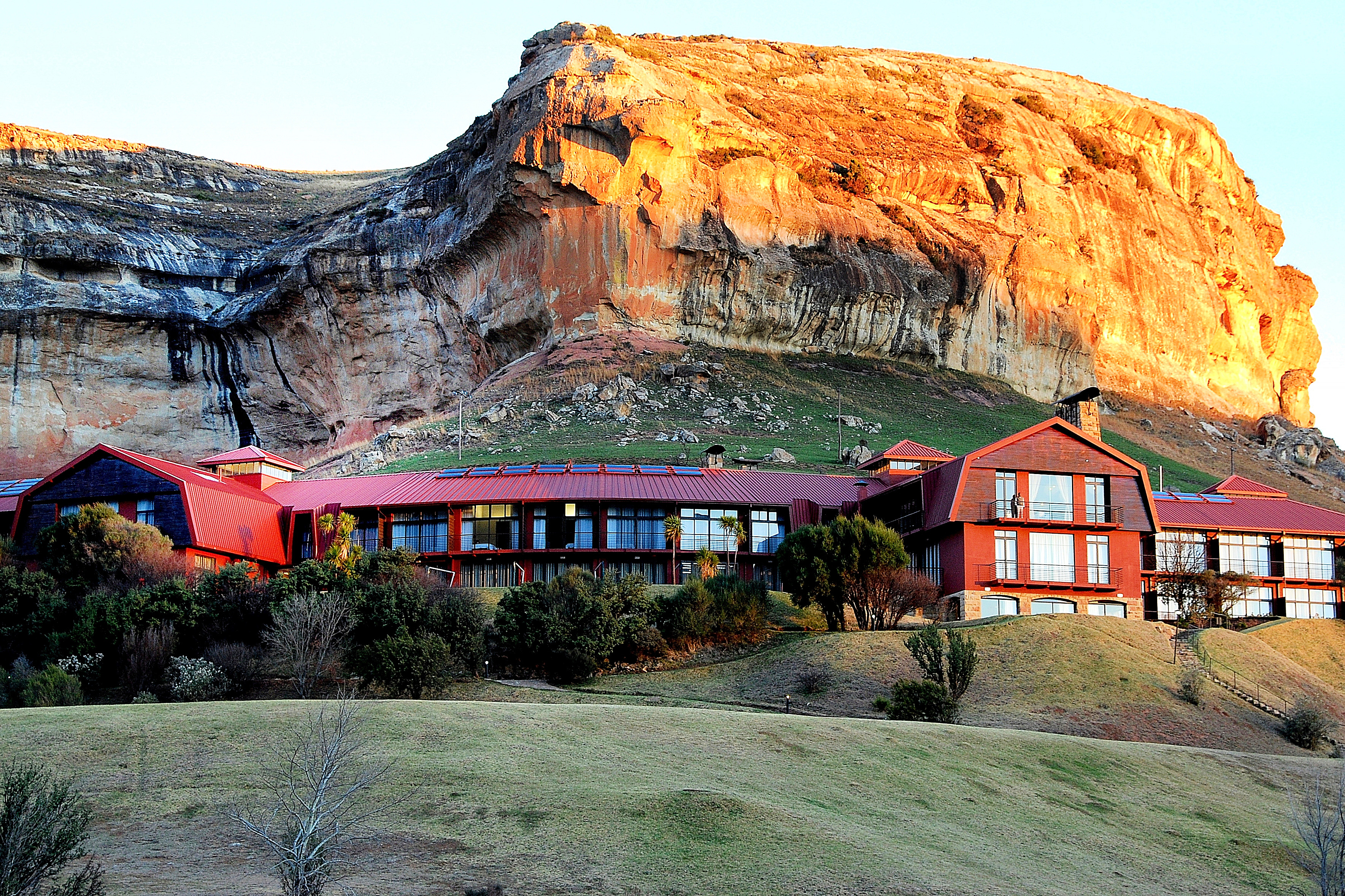
Golden Gate Hotel

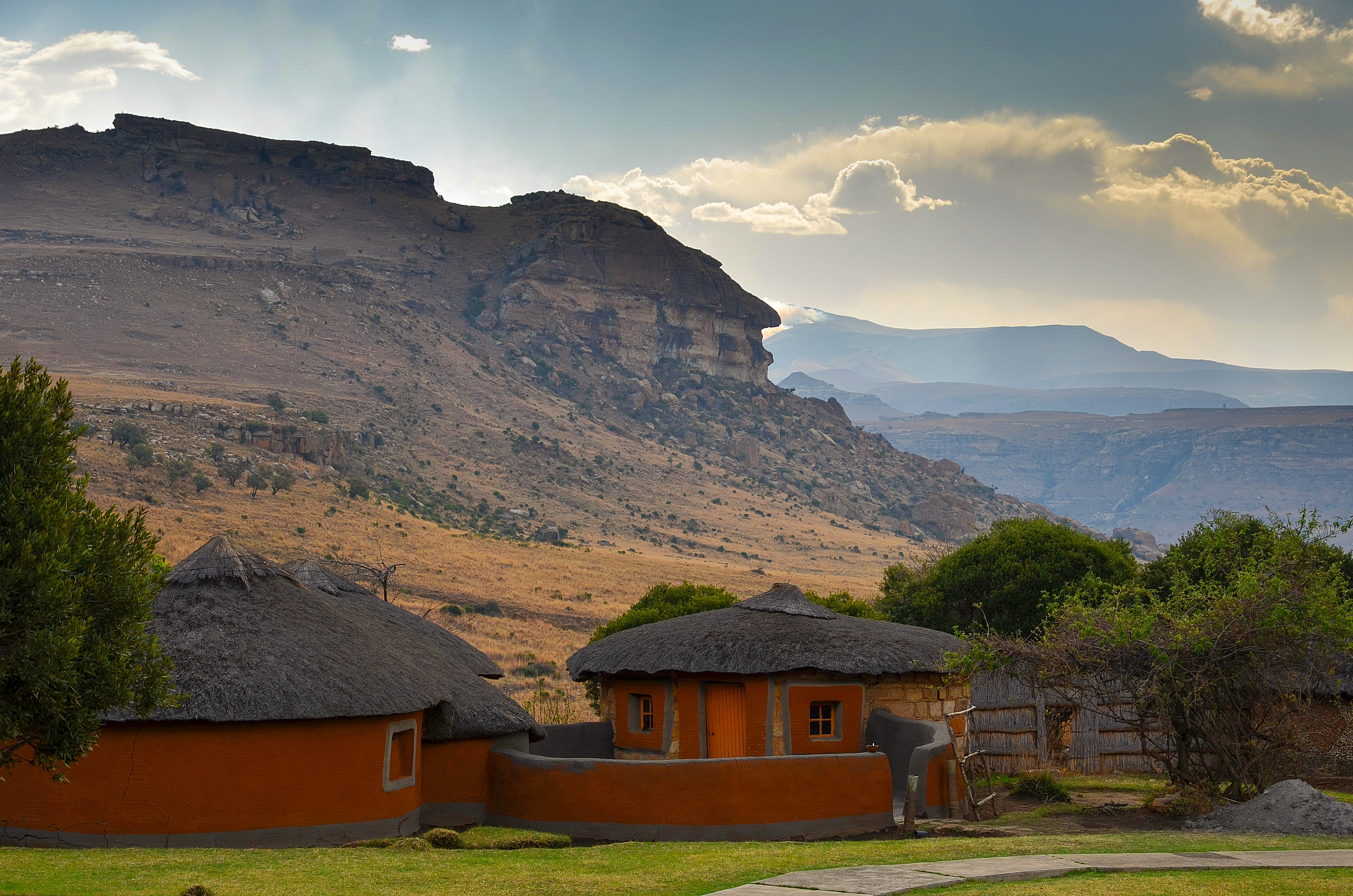
Basotho Cultural Village landscape

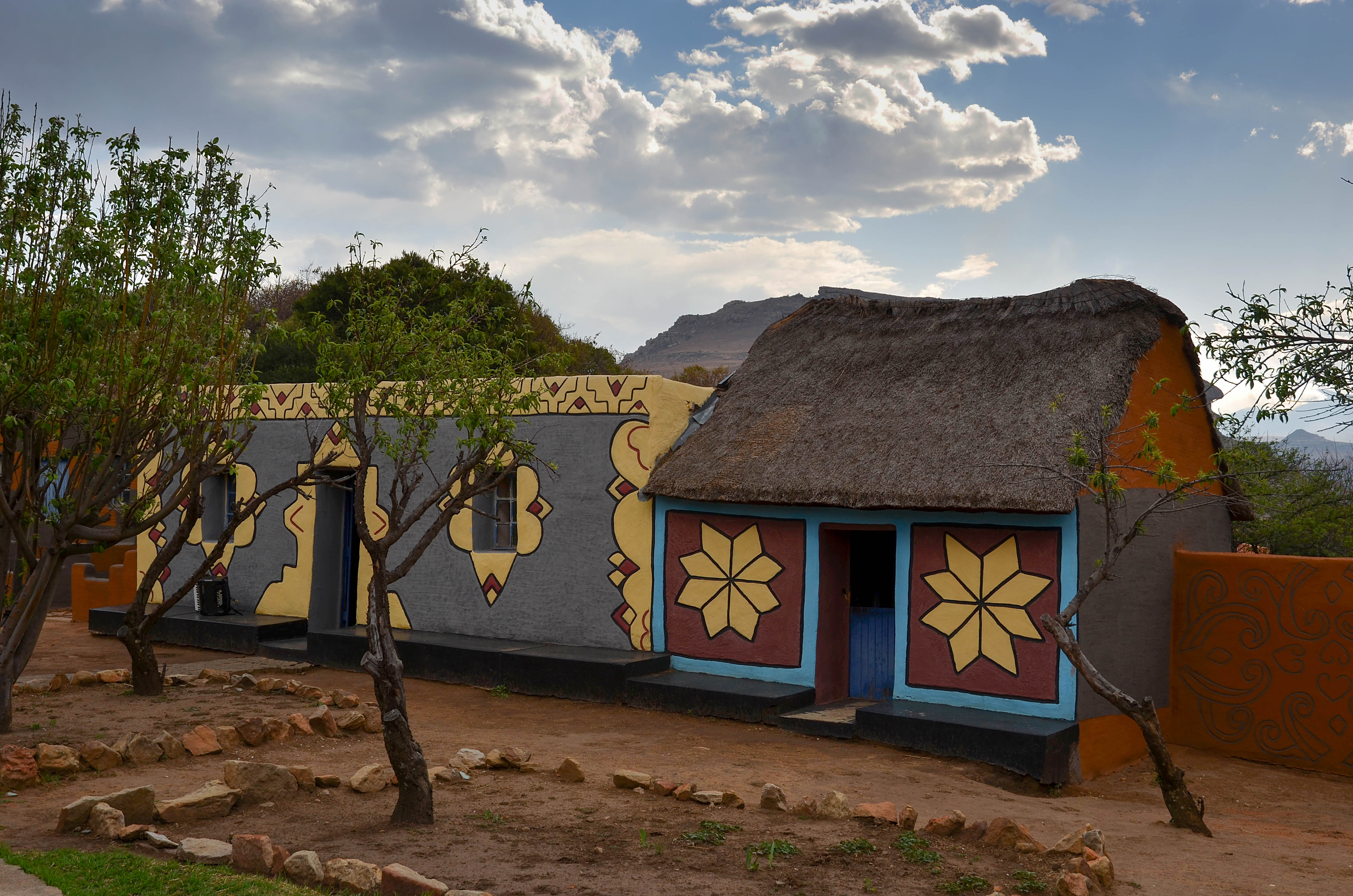
Basotho Cultural Village hut

== Activities ==
The park offers bird watching, game tours, guided horse riding and a two-day hiking trail which spans 27 kilometres. There is also a tour of the Basotho Cultural Village.

=== Basotho Cultural Village Tour ===
The Basotho Cultural Village offers an opportunity for visitors to experience South Sotho culture and history, including the household implementation and symbolism in traditional attire. Traditional homesteads from the 1700s have been reconstructed and are on site.

== See also ==
- Sotho people
- Land reform in South Africa
- Sterkfontein dam
- Clarens, Free State
