= Phuthaditjhaba =

Place in the province of Free State, South Africa

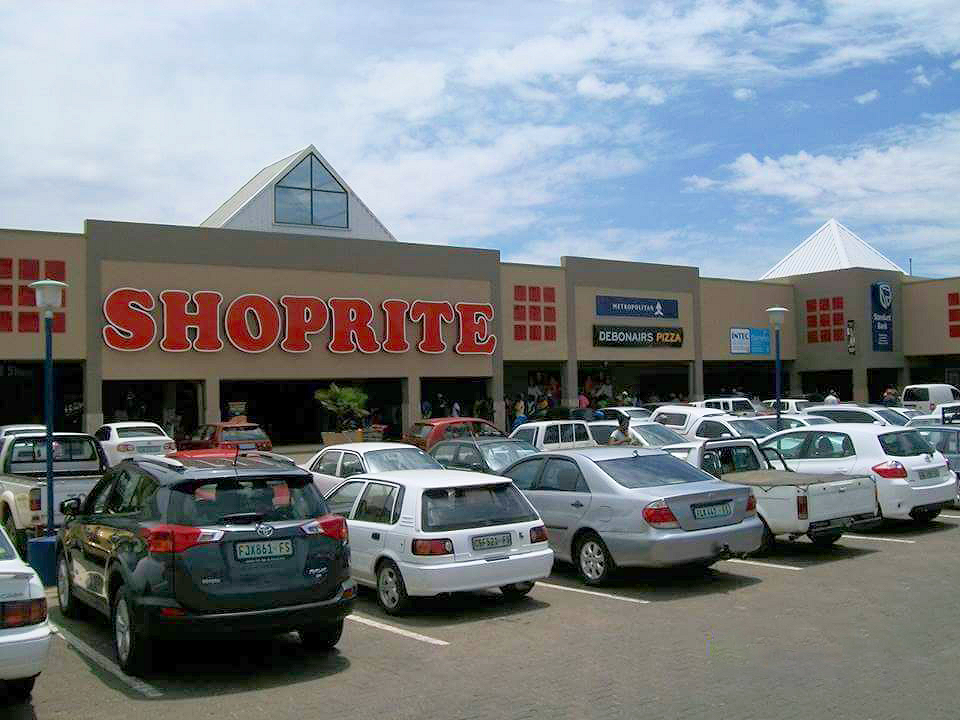
- Mandela Park shopping centre

- Location of Phuthaditjhaba in Free State province Location of Phuthaditjhaba in South Africa
- Coordinates: 28°32′00″S 28°49′00″E
- Country: South Africa
- Province: Free State
- District: Thabo Mofutsanyana
- Municipality: Maluti a Phofung
- Established: 1974
  - Councillor: (ANC)

Area
  - Total: 23.83 km^{2} (9.20 sq mi)
- Elevation: 1,646 m (5,400 ft)

Population (2011)
  - Total: 54,661
  - Density: 2,294/km^{2} (5,941/sq mi)

Racial makeup (2011)
  - Black African: 99.0%
  - Coloured: 0.2%
  - Indian/Asian: 0.5%
  - White: 0.1%
  - Other: 0.2%

First languages (2011)
  - Sotho: 88.8%
  - Zulu: 4.4%
  - English: 2.0%
  - Sign language: 1.5%
  - Other: 3.3%
- Time zone: UTC+2 (SAST)
- Postal code (street): 9866
- PO box: 9869
- Area code: 058

Phuthaditjhaba (previously Witsieshoek), is a town in the Free State province of South Africa. It is located in a section of the Drakensberg mountains (Maloti in the Sesotho language). It borders the province of KwaZulu-Natal to the south east and the independent country of Lesotho to the south west. The town was capital of the bantustan, or homeland, of QwaQwa. When apartheid ended, the town became part of the Free State province.

== History ==
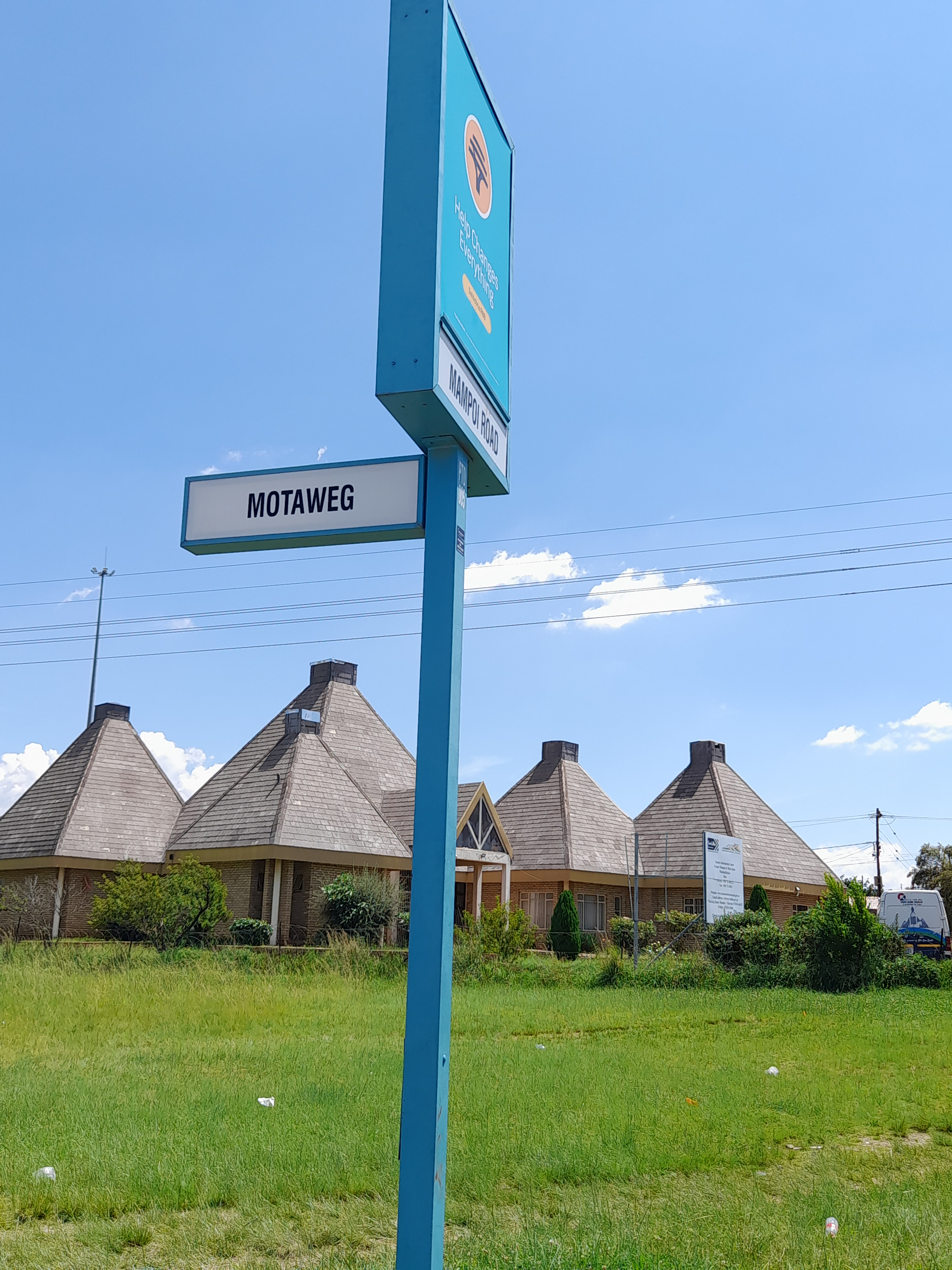
Tsela ya Morena Mota

The frequent snow on the Drakensberg mountain peaks surrounding the town led the San to call the region QwaQwa (whiter than white). The Afrikaners named the town Witsieshoek in honour of Oetse (also spelled Witsie and Wetsi), a Makholokoe chief who lived there from 1839 to 1856. The name Phuthaditjhaba is a Sesotho name that means meeting place of the tribes. It is located on the banks of the Elands River.

The area was historically inhabited by bantu clans of the South Sotho, namely the Makholokoe, Bataung, Bakoena and the Batlokoa. The Orange Free State government settled these people there in the 1870s after concluding a peace settlement with their leaders. In 1926 the Orange Free State government placed the Batlokoa under the authority of the Bakoena but gave each group its own regional authority in 1930. In 1969 they were combined into a single territorial authority, which was replaced two years later by a legislative assembly. Qwaqwa was granted self-government in 1974.

In 1974 it became capital of the bantustan (or "homeland") of QwaQwa. When the apartheid system was abolished in South Africa in 1994, it became part of the Free State province.

The town is the formal gateway to rural QwaQwa. Service provision in the area is difficult - the land is mountainous and homes in remote areas lack access to basic services. It is the poorest area in the Free State Province. The Mofumahadi Manapo Mopeli Regional Hospital is located here.

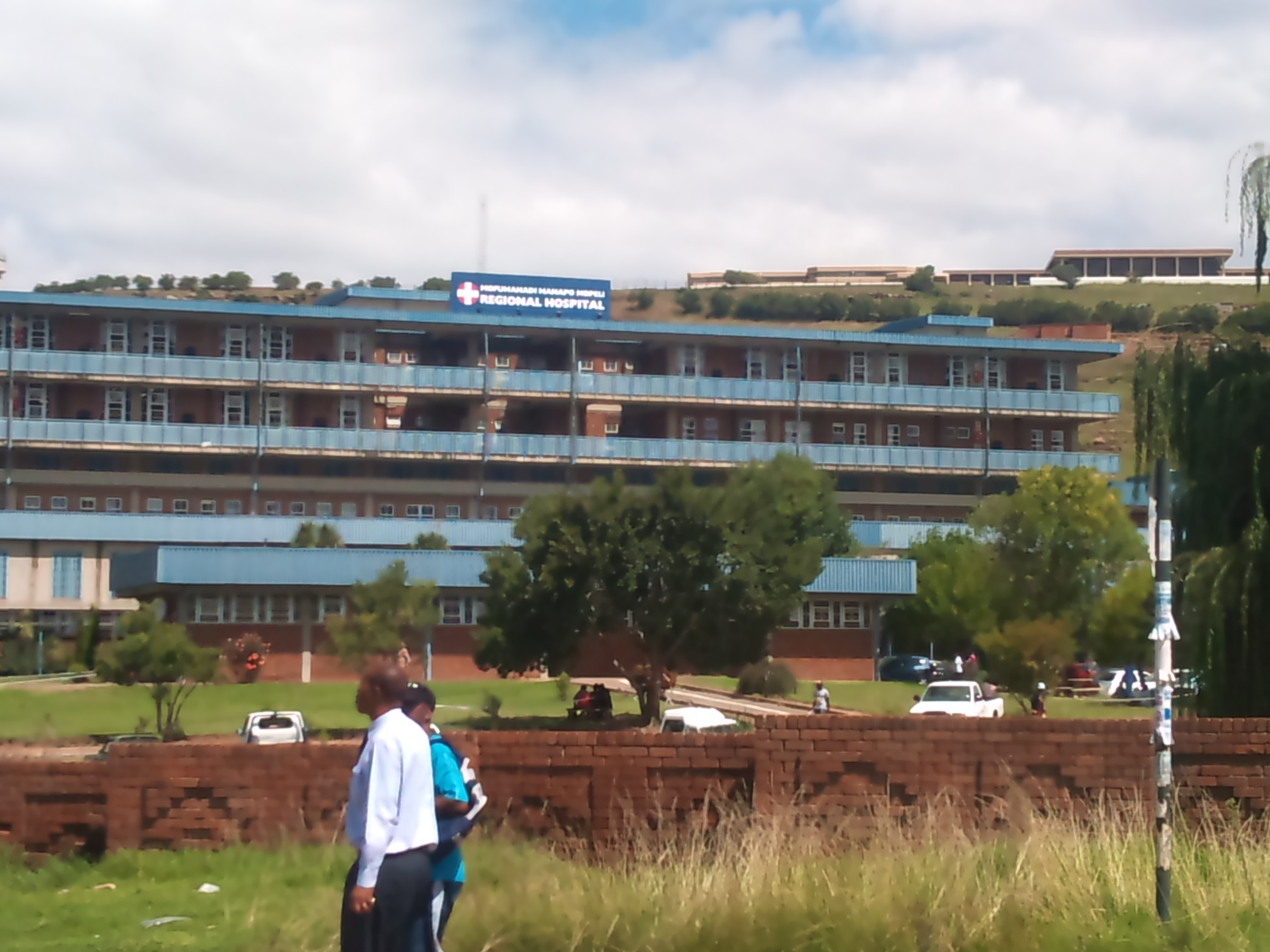
View of the Mofumahadi Manapo Mopeli Hospital

== Tourism and conservation ==
In 2005 the former QwaQwa National Park—and its Basotho Cultural Village—was formally incorporated into Golden Gate Highlands National Park. Today the “QwaQwa Rest Camp” offers visitors immersive tours of traditional Basotho homesteads, guided horse-rides and hiking in the iconic golden sandstone cliffs of the Maluti Mountains.

== Education ==
The town hosts the University of the Free State’s QwaQwa Campus. Originally established in 1982 under Dr T.K. Mopeli, it became part of UFS in 2003 and now enrolls approximately 3 800 students across Humanities, Education, Economic & Management Sciences, and Natural & Agricultural Sciences. The campus emphasises rural-development research and community outreach.

== Notable people ==
- Seipati Seoke - Lesedi FM Presenter and 2020 DStv Mzansi Viewers' Choice Awards
- Hlaudi Motsoeneng - African Content Movement (ACM) and former acting Chief operating officer of the South African Broadcasting Corporation (SABC)

== See also ==
- Bolata
- Witzieshoek Revolt
- Makwane
- QwaQwa
- Tseki
- Tshiame
- Harrismith
