= Maluti-a-Phofung Local Municipality =

Maluti-a-Phofung ThabaDimahlwa
- Local municipality
- Seal

- Location in the Free State
- Coordinates: 28°33′04″S 29°04′48″E
- Country: South Africa
- Province: Free State
- District: Thabo Mofutsanyane
- Seat: Phuthaditjhaba
- Wards: 35

Government
  - Type: Municipal council
  - Mayor: Malekula Melato (ANC)

Area
  - Total: 4,338 km^{2} (1,675 sq mi)

Population (2022)
  - Total: 398,459
  - Density: 91.85/km^{2} (237.9/sq mi)

Racial makeup (2022)
  - Black African: 97.9%
  - Coloured: 0.2%
  - Indian/Asian: 0.3%
  - White: 1.5%

First languages (2011)
  - Sotho: 52.5%
  - Zulu: 40.8%
  - Afrikaans: 2.0%
  - English: 1.5%
  - Other: 3.2%
- Time zone: UTC+2 (SAST)
- Municipal code: FS194

Maluti-a-Phofung Municipality (Sotho: Masepala wa Maluti-a-Phofung; Zulu: UMasipala wase Maluti-a-Phofung) is a local municipality within the Thabo Mofutsanyane District Municipality, in the Free State province of South Africa. It encompasses substantially all of the former bantustan of QwaQwa, except for the small enclave at Botshabelo. The population is almost entirely Basotho. The municipality is named after the Drakensberg mountains (known as Maluti in Sesotho). The peak is known as the Sentinel, which is called Phofung in Sesotho.

== Problems ==
Maluti-a-Phofung is one of the very poor municipalities in the Free State; as of 2011 over 82% live below the poverty line. Prior to 1994, the area was relatively prosperous with over 250,000 people employed in the textile and furniture industries, mostly at low wages. The new South African government terminated industrial subsidies. That and labor agitation for higher wages made the factories uneconomic, and over the next decade most of the factories closed. The last one closed in 2010. At present government is the largest employer followed by a weak retail employment. The municipality itself has been in substantial debt for decades, and owes a considerable debt to both the regional water and electrical utilities (R3,769 million).

=== Municipal services ===
The failure to deliver adequate municipal services has been a chronic problem since at least 2000. As a result, there have been a number of protests by the populace, among which was the one in Harrismith in 2004.

In 2018, local residents held a mass protest concerning the failure to provide municipal services. The protest turned into a riot, shopping malls were looted, and one man was fatally shot. As a result, Cogta (the Free State Department of Cooperative Governance and Traditional Affairs) intervened and administration was removed from the mayor and local council and placed directly under Cogta, a move welcomed by the South African Municipal Workers' Union.

As of June 2022, there have been some improvements, with delivery of water stabilising, and a better relationship with Eskom.

== Politics ==
The municipal council consists of sixty-nine members elected by mixed-member proportional representation. Thirty-five councillors are elected by first-past-the-post voting in thirty-five wards, while the remaining thirty-four are chosen from party lists so that the total number of party representatives is proportional to the number of votes received.

In the 2026 election no party won a majority. The ANC is the party with the largest number of seats.

=== Election results ===
The 2021 election saw the African National Congress (ANC) lose its majority for the first time. Although it still finished with the most seats, a rival grouping led by the MAP16 Civic Movement, founded by a group of ANC councillors who had been expelled for voting to unseat the ANC mayor, who was facing corruption charges, formed a coalition to take control. Maluti-a-Phofung became the first local municipality in the Free State not to be governed by the ANC.

The coalition consisted of the MAP16 Civic Movement, Economic Freedom Fighters, Dikwankwetla Party, African Transformation Movement, African Independent Congress and the South African Royal Kingdoms Organization, supported by the Democratic Alliance and Freedom Front Plus.

The following table shows the results of the 2026 election.

Party	Ward			List			Total seats
Party	Votes	%	Seats	Votes	%	Seats	Total seats
African National Congress	26,297	29.23	20	26,791	30.02	1	21
African Content Movement	17,659	19.63	7	19,932	22.33	8	15
Democratic Alliance	16,412	18.24	4	17,545	19.66	10	14
MAP16 Civic Movement	7,264	8.07	3	6,425	7.20	3	6
Economic Freedom Fighters	4,178	4.64	0	4,299	4.82	3	3
South African Communist Party	2,016	2.24	1	1,835	2.06	1	2
African Transformation Movement	1,818	2.02	0	1,891	2.12	2	2
Dikwankwetla Party of South Africa	1,458	1.62	0	1,338	1.50	1	1
Freedom Front Plus	1,221	1.36	0	1,229	1.38	1	1
African Congress for Transformation	851	0.95	0	980	1.10	1	1
Community First Alliance	757	0.84	0	1,068	1.20	1	1
Baahi Civic Movement	780	0.87	0	771	0.86	1	1
Independent candidates	1,386	1.54	0				0
African People's Movement	742	0.82	0	598	0.67	1	1
Patriotic Alliance	552	0.61	0	547	0.61	1	1
17 other parties	6,582	7.32	0	3,995	4.48	0	0
Total	89,973	100.00	35	89,244	100.00	35	70
Valid votes	89,973	97.64		89,244	97.31		
Invalid/blank votes	2,173	2.36		2,465	2.69		
Total votes	92,146	100.00		91,709	100.00		
Registered voters/turnout	189,966	48.51		189,966	48.28		

== Main places ==
The 2001 census divided the municipality into the following main places:

Place	Code	Area (km^{2})	Population	Most spoken language
42nd Hill	41501	2.81	16,077	Zulu
Bolata	41502	33.46	29,932	Sotho
Harrismith	41503	136.14	6,345	Afrikaans
Intabazwe	41504	0.82	3,685	Zulu
Kestell	41505	13.54	889	Afrikaans
Mabolela	41506	25.52	23,727	Sotho
Matsieng	41508	79.62	23,858	Sotho
Monontsha	41509	45.81	50,438	Sotho
Namahadi	41510	59.58	86,965	Sotho
Phomolong	41511	16.51	6,413	Sotho
Phuthaditjhaba	41512	38.48	53,175	Sotho
Thaba Bosiu	41513	43.64	8,131	Sotho
Thaba Tshweu	41514	109.54	8,876	Sotho
Thibela	41515	31.30	5,039	Sotho
Tlholong	41516	1.15	4,824	Sotho
Tshiame	41517	9.24	12,963	Sotho
Witsieshoek	41518	52.41	4,307	Sotho
Remainder of the municipality	41507	3,721.58	15,142	Sotho
