= Kestell =

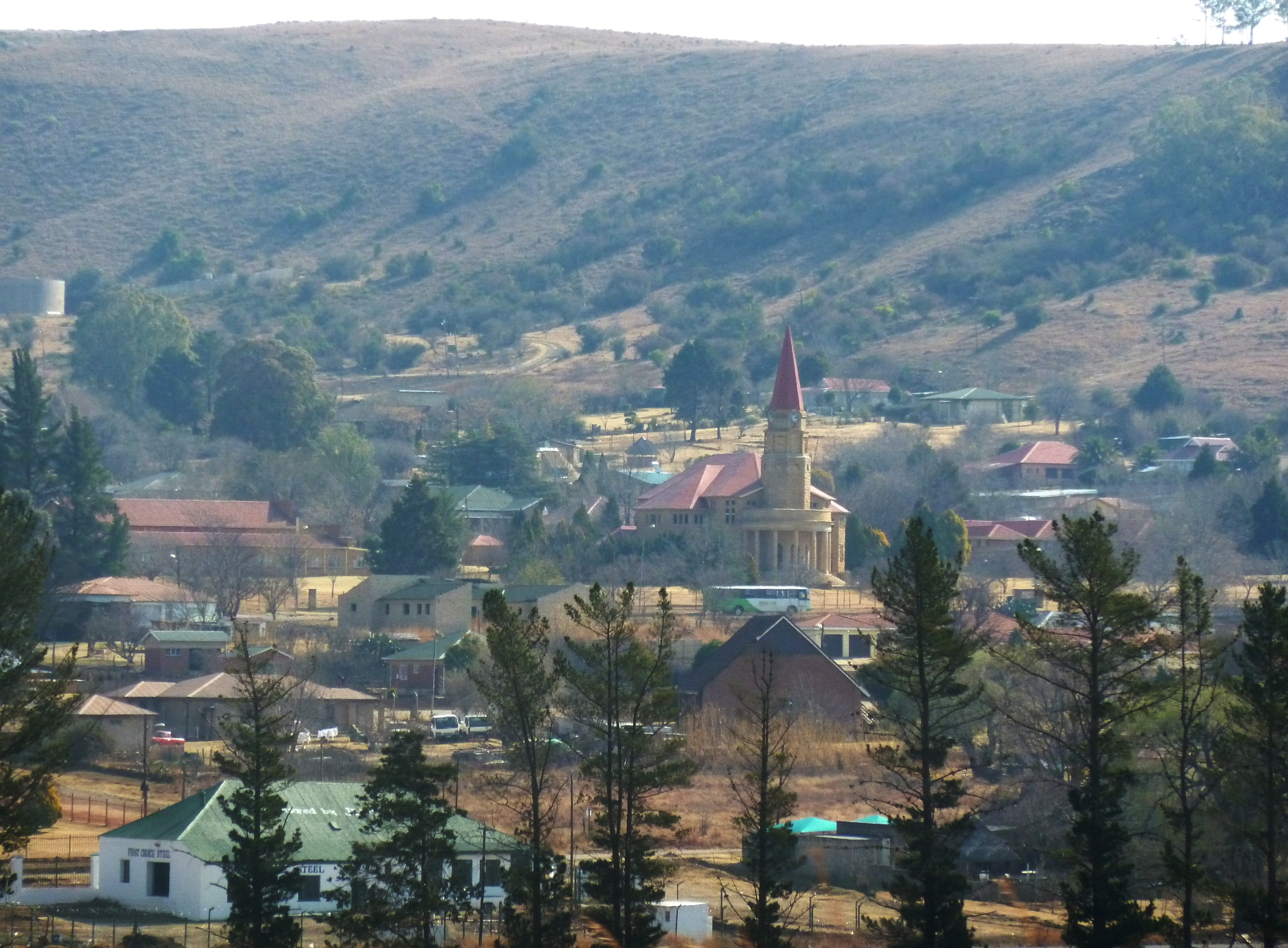

- Location within Free State (South African province) Location within South Africa
- Coordinates: 28°19′S 28°42′E
- Country: South Africa
- Province: Free State
- District: Thabo Mofutsanyana
- Municipality: Maluti a Phofung

Area
  - Total: 12.6 km^{2} (4.9 sq mi)
- Elevation: 1,700 m (5,600 ft)

Population (2011)
  - Total: 8,269
  - Density: 656/km^{2} (1,700/sq mi)

Racial makeup (2011)
  - Black African: 92.8%
  - Coloured: 0.3%
  - Indian/Asian: 0.4%
  - White: 6.4%
  - Other: 0.1%

First languages (2011)
  - Sotho: 80.5%
  - Zulu: 7.5%
  - Afrikaans: 6.8%
  - English: 2.5%
  - Other: 2.6%
- Time zone: UTC+2 (SAST)
- Area code: 058

Kestell is a small maize farming town in the Free State province of South Africa.

Town 46 km west of Harrismith and 45 kilometres (28 mi) east of Bethlehem. The new village was laid out in 1905 on the farms Mooifontein and Driekuil, acquired from Adriaan and Johannes Bezuidenhout. It became a municipality in 1906.

== Dutch Reformed Church and town's naming ==
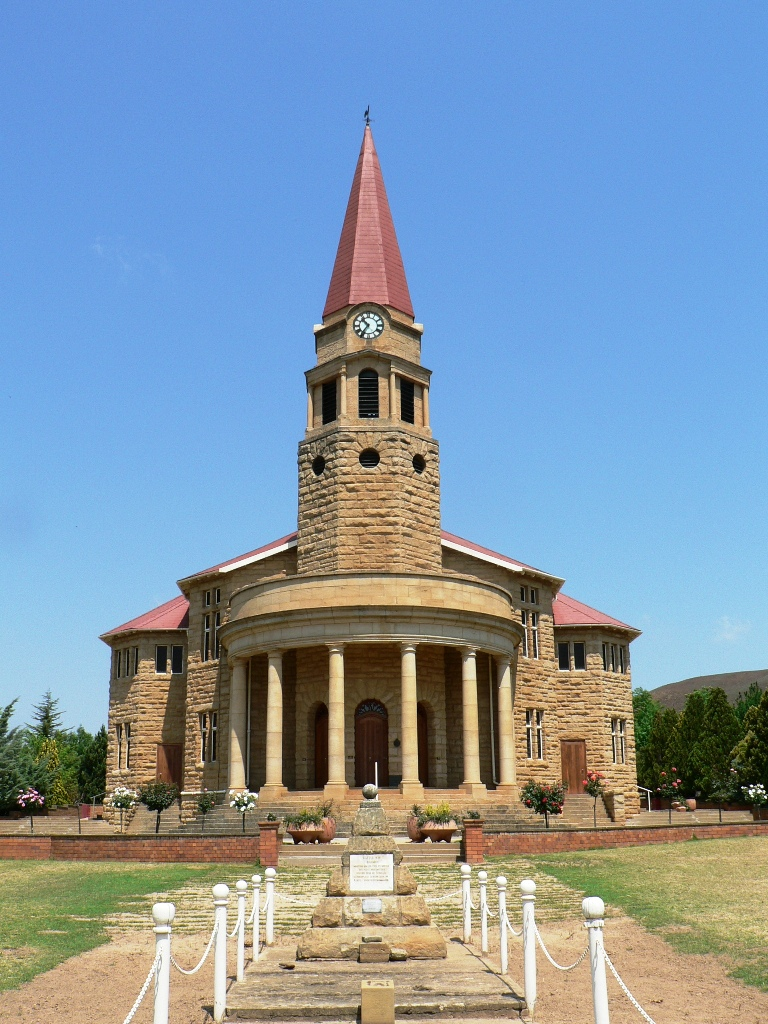
The Dutch Reformed church building in Kestell

It is named after the Reverend Dr. John Daniel Kestell (1854 - 1941), Anglo-Afrikaner minister of the Dutch Reformed Church from 1894 to 1903, author and cultural leader, who played an important role in the Anglo-Boer War and later helped with the Bible translations into Afrikaans. The Dutch Reformed Church building, designed by famed architect of dozens of churches and the Voortrekker Monument, Gerard Moerdijk, was inaugurated on 31 March 1928.

The township was surveyed and laid out by William Homan in 1905. To prevent jealousy he 'called the long streets after the tall members of the committee and the short streets after the short members.'When the committee insisted that Homan had a street named after him, he selected 'a rough short street' which still bears that name.

=== Legacy ===
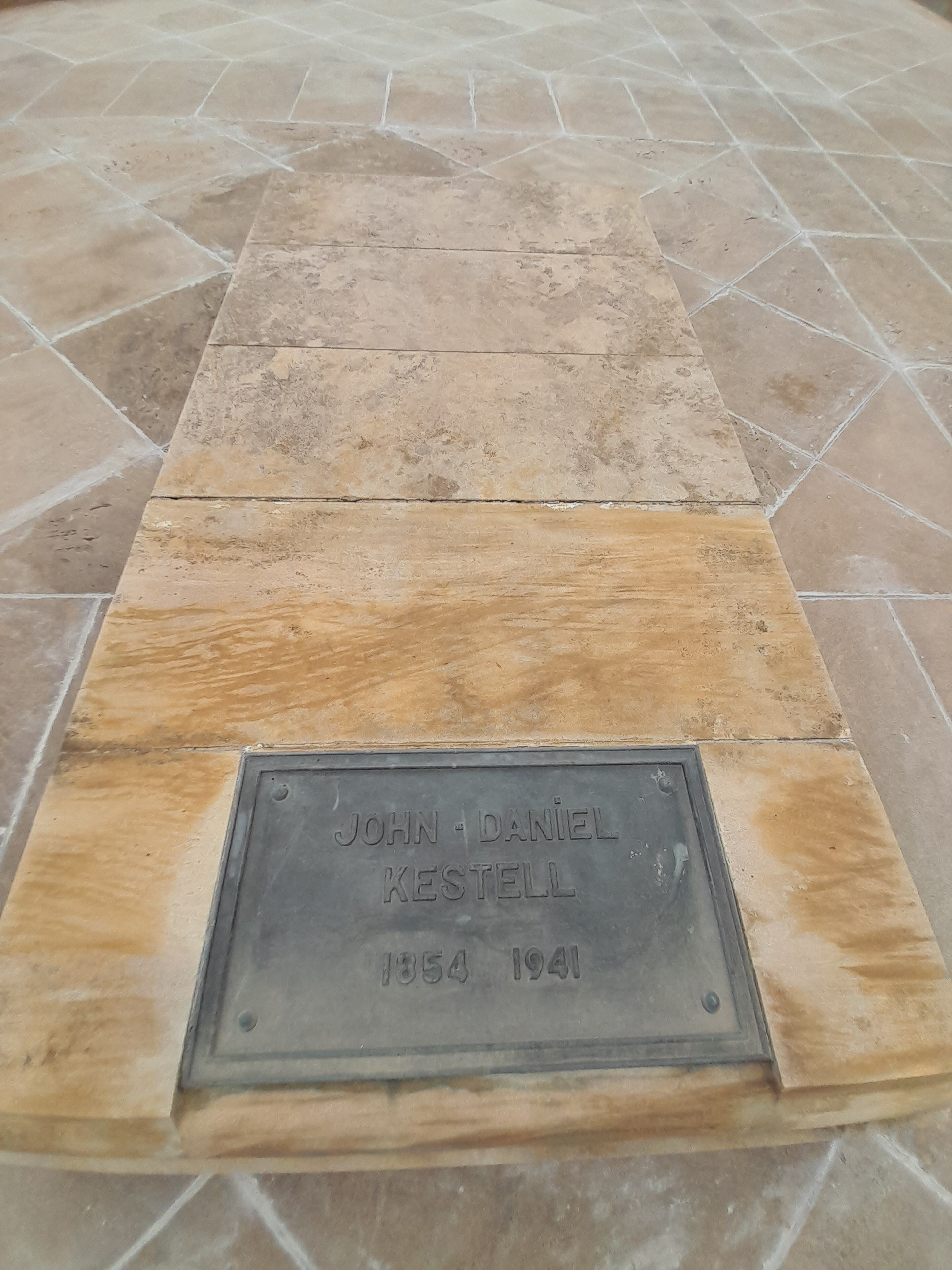
Prof. Dr. JD Kestell grave at the War Museum in Bloemfontein

Prof. Dr JD Kestell at the Anglo-Boer War Museum in Bloemfontein is named after him.

== War Battle ==
It is located 20 kilometres (12 mi) southeast from the Battle of Groenkop-site of the Second Boer War. The battle took place on 25 December 1901 when General Christiaan De Wet's Boer troops defeated a British column.

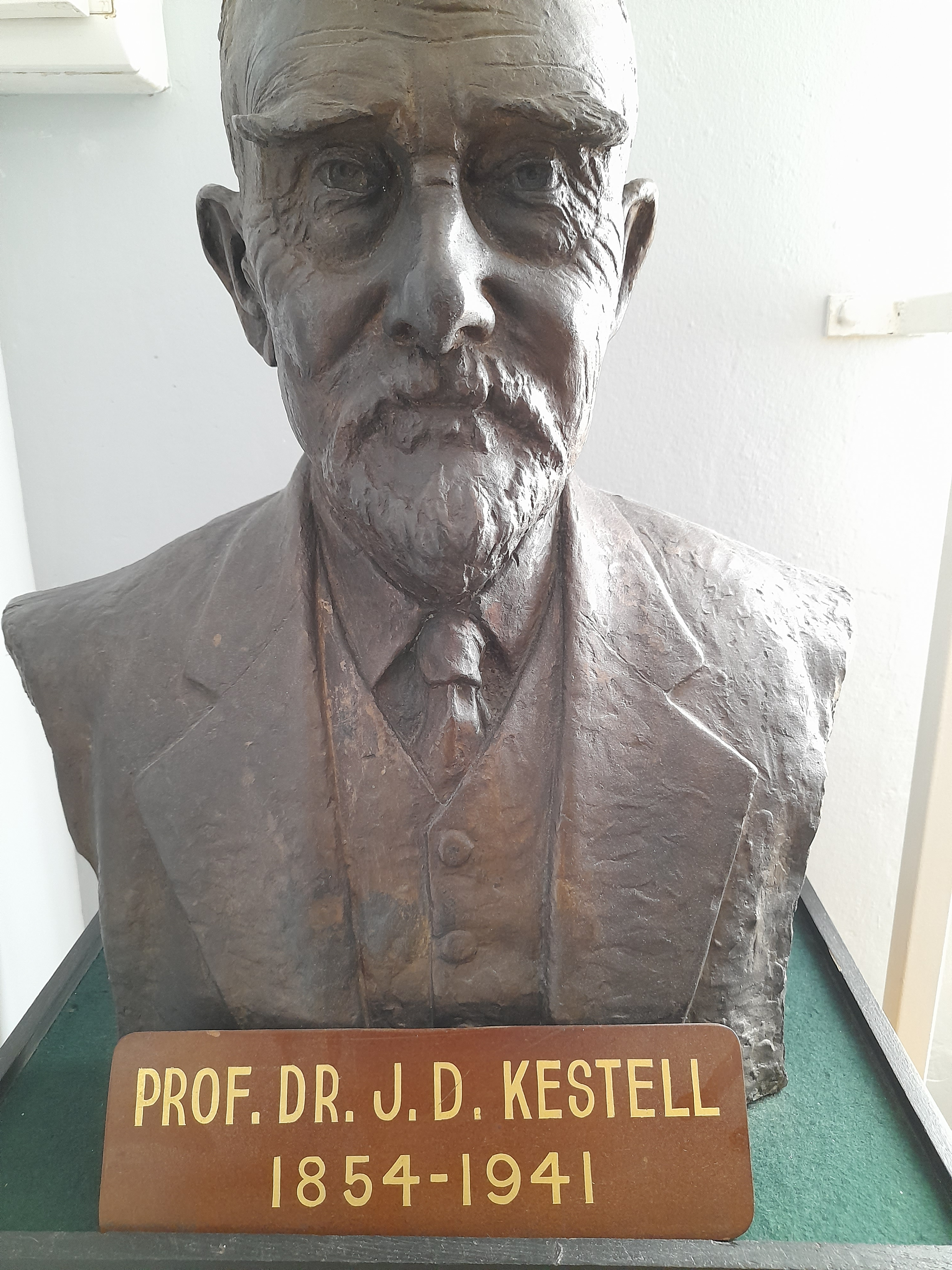
Dr.JD Kestell bust at the War Museum, Bloemfontein
