= Mabolela =

Mabolela is a rural village in QwaQwa in the Free State province of South Africa. In 2014, the chief of the Mabolela traditional council, Morena Tsolo Mopeli, sought intervention from the South African Human Rights Commission following a mass eviction of hundreds of farmers in QwaQwa.
