= Thabo Mofutsanyana District Municipality =

Thabo Mofutsanyane
- District municipality
- Seal

- Location of Thabo Mofutsanyana District Municipality within Free State
- Coordinates: 28°32′S 28°49′E
- Country: South Africa
- Province: Free State
- Seat: Phuthaditjhaba
- Local municipalities: List: Setsoto; Dihlabeng; Maluti-a-Phofung; Nketoana; Phumelela; Mantsopa

Government
  - Type: Municipal council
  - Mayor: Connie Msibi (ANC)

Area
  - Total: 33,269 km^{2} (12,845 sq mi)

Population (2011)
  - Total: 736,238
  - Density: 22.130/km^{2} (57.316/sq mi)

Racial makeup (2011)
  - Black African: 93.8%
  - Coloured: 0.8%
  - Indian/Asian: 0.4%
  - White: 4.8%

First languages (2011)
  - Sotho: 78.5%
  - Zulu: 10.4%
  - Afrikaans: 6.0%
  - English: 2.0%
  - Other: 3.1%
- Time zone: UTC+2 (SAST)
- Municipal code: DC19

The Thabo Mofutsanyana District Municipality (Sotho: Masepala wa Setereke wa Thabo Mofutsanyana; Zulu: UMasipala wesiFunda iThabo Mofutsanyana) is one of the 5 districts of the Free State province of South Africa. The seat is Witsieshoek. As of 2011, a majority of its 725,932 residents spoke Sesotho. The district code is DC19

== Geography ==
=== Neighbours ===
Thabo Mofutsanyana is surrounded by:

- Fezile Dabi to the north (DC20)
- Lejweleputswa to the west (DC18)
- Gert Sibande in Mpumalanga to the north-east (DC30)
- Amajuba in Kwa-Zulu Natal to the east (DC25)
- Uthukela to the south-east (DC23)
- The kingdom of Lesotho to the south
- Mangaung Metro to the south-west

=== Local municipalities ===
The district contains the following local municipalities:

Local municipality	Population	%	Dominant language
Maluti-a-Phofung	335 784	45.61%	Sotho
Dihlabeng	128 704	17.48%	Sotho
Setsoto	112 597	15.29%	Sotho
Nketoana	60 324	8.19%	Sotho
Mantsopa	51 056	6.93%	Sotho
Phumelela	47 772	6.49%	Zulu
Golden Gate Highlands National Park	1	0.01%	

== Demographics ==
The following statistics are from the 2011 census.

Language	Population	%
Sesotho	570 076	78.55%
IsiZulu	75 410	10.39%
Afrikaans	43 226	5.96%
English	14 646	2.02%
IsiXhosa	4 106	0.57%
Setswana	2 380	0.33%
IsiNdebele	1 595	0.22%
Sepedi	761	0.10%
Xitsonga	429	0.06%
SiSwati	323	0.04%
Tshivenda	224	0.03%

=== Gender ===
Gender	Population	%
Female	393 068	53.39%
Male	343 170	46.61%

=== Ethnic group ===
Ethnic group	Population	%
Black African	690 340	93.77%
White	35 517	4.82%
Coloured	6 188	0.84%
Indian/Asian	2 881	0.39%

== Politics ==
=== Election results ===
Election results for Thabo Mofutsanyana in the 2019 South African general election.

- Registered voters: 398 412
- Total votes: 242 241
- Voting turnout: 60.8%

Party	Votes	%
African National Congress	163 473	68.6%
Democratic Alliance	30 562	12.8%
Economic Freedom Fighters	26 805	11.3%
Freedom Front Plus	5 537	2.3%
African Transformation Movement	2 516	1.1%
African Content Movement	1 106	0.5%
African Independent Congress	1 085	0.5%
Congress of the People	930	0.4%
African Christian Democratic Party	813	0.3%
Other parties	9 414	2.2%
Total	242 241	100.00%
