= Orange Free State (province) =

Former South African province (1910–1994)

Coordinates: 29.1167°S 26.2167°E

Province of the Orange Free State Provinsie Oranje-Vrystaat (Afrikaans)
- Province of South Africa
- 1910–1994
- Flag Coat of arms

- The OFS as it was by 1994
- Capital: Bloemfontein
- Area
  - 1991: 129,825 km^{2} (50,126 sq mi)
- Population
  - 1991: 2,193,062
- Legislature: Orange Free State Provincial Council
- History
  - Established: 31 May 1910
  - Disestablished: 27 April 1994
Preceded by	Succeeded by
Orange River Colony	Free State
- Today part of: South Africa

The Province of the Orange Free State (Afrikaans: Provinsie Oranje-Vrystaat), commonly referred to as the Orange Free State (Afrikaans: Oranje-Vrystaat), Free State (Afrikaans: Vrystaat) or by its abbreviation OFS, was one of the four provinces of South Africa from 1910 to 1994. After 27 April 1994 it was dissolved following the first non-racial election in South Africa. It is now called the Free State Province.

Its predecessor was the Orange River Colony which in 1902 had replaced the Orange Free State, a Boer republic.

Its outside borders were the same as those of the modern Free State Province; except for the bantustans ("homelands") of QwaQwa and one part of Bophuthatswana, which were contained on land inside of the provincial Orange Free State borders.

== Districts in 1991 ==
Districts of the province and population at the 1991 census.

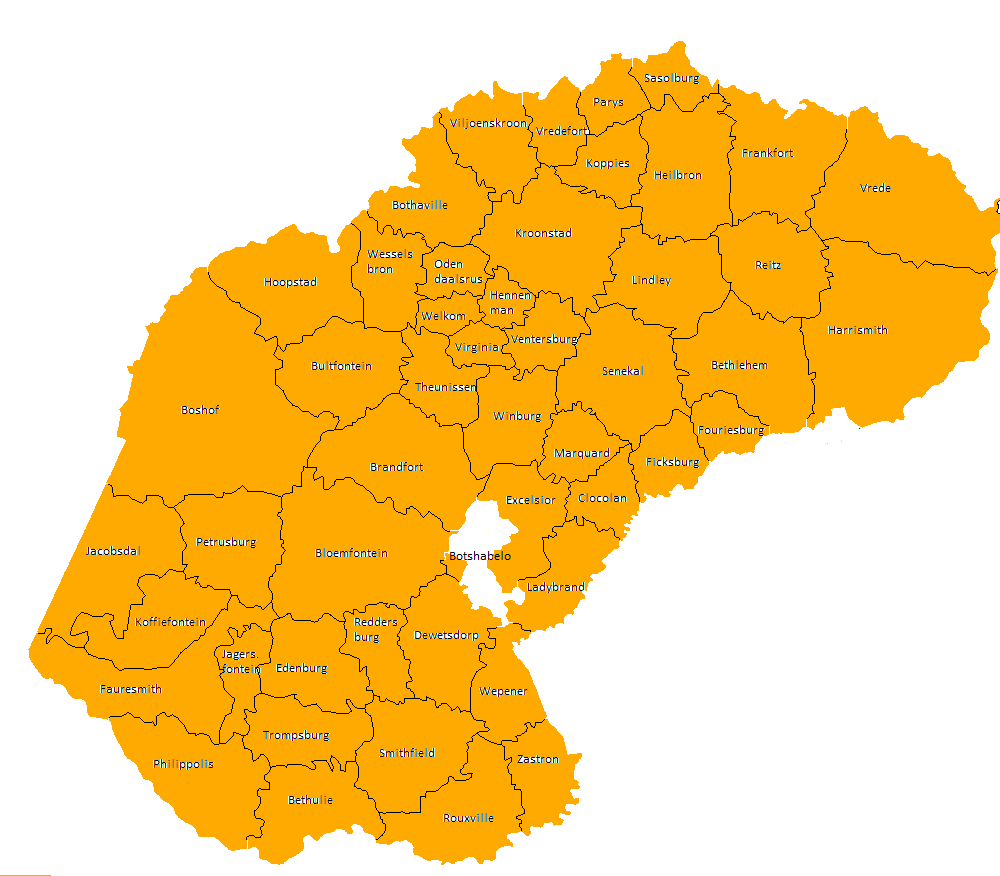
A map of districts of the Orange Free State

District	Population
Zastron	14,122
Rouxville	11,904
Bethulie	9,333
Smithfield	7,946
Wepener	12,964
Dewetsdorp	13,521
Reddersburg	6,070
Edenburg	6,968
Trompsburg	5,138
Jagersfontein	6,353
Bloemfontein	300,150
Petrusburg	11,071
Brandfort	23,521
Botshabelo	177,926
Philippolis	7,056
Fauresmith	8,916
Koffiefontein	10,778
Jacobsdal	9,748
Boshof	32,033
Theunissen	38,482
Bultfontein	28,556
Hoopstad	27,934
Wesselsbron	26,494
Odendaalsrus	97,603
Welkom	248,186
Virginia	81,780
Hennenman	25,165
Ventersburg	14,534
Ladybrand	30,532
Excelsior	18,051
Clocolan	18,542
Marquard	17,217
Winburg	17,765
Senekal	41,551
Ficksburg	36,810
Fouriesburg	16,932
Bethlehem	80,921
Lindley	37,664
Reitz	30,712
Harrismith	63,220
Vrede	37,324
Kroonstad	110,963
Bothaville	54,726
Viljoenskroon	59,279
Vredefort	13,518
Koppies	19,723
Parys	48,678
Sasolburg	89,079
Heilbron	40,987
Frankfort	44,617

== Politics ==
The province was a stronghold of the National party

Province	National	United	Labor	Other	Total
1943 South African general election	13	1	0	0	14
1948 South African general election	11	1	0	1	13
1953 South African general election	13	0	0	0	13
1958 South African general election	14	0	0	0	14
1961 South African general election	14	0	0	0	14
1966 South African general election	15	0	0	0	15
1974 South African general election	14	0	0	0	14
1981 South African general election	14	0	0	0	14
1989 South African general election	8	0	0	6	14

== See also ==
- Orange Free State
- Free State (South African province)
