= R703 (South Africa) =

Regional route in South Africa

Regional route R703

Route information
- Length: 200 km (120 mi)

Major junctions
- West end: R64 in Dealesville
- R700 near Soutpan; R30 in Brandfort; N1 near Verkeerdevlei; R709 in Excelsior
- East end: R708 in Clocolan

Location
- Country: South Africa

Highway system
- Numbered routes of South Africa
← R702	→ R704

The R703 is a regional route in Free State, South Africa that connects Dealesville with Clocolan via Brandfort, Verkeerdevlei and Excelsior.

== Route ==
Its western terminus is the R64 just east of Dealesville. From there, it heads east to the town of Soutpan. Just outside Soutpan, it crosses the R700 at a staggered intersection. Continuing east, it reaches Brandfort, where it crosses the R30. From Brandfort, the route initially heads east, reaching a t-junction. The R703 continues along the intersecting road, heading south-east, while the other road is unsigned and heads to Winburg. The south-eastern R703 crosses the N1 to reach Verkeerdevlei. Leaving the town, it maintains its direction coming to Excelsior. Here it forms a staggered intersection with the R709 and leaves the town heading east. The route ends at Clocolan, at an intersection with the R708.
