= N5 (South Africa) =

National road in South Africa

National route N5

Route information
- Maintained by SANRAL
- Length: 235 km (146 mi)

Major junctions
- West end: N1 at Winburg
- East end: N3 at Harrismith

Location
- Country: South Africa
- Provinces: Free State
- Major cities: Bethlehem, Harrismith

Highway system
- Numbered routes of South Africa
← N4	→ N6

The N5 is a national route in South Africa that connects the N1 at Winburg with the N3 at Harrismith, via Senekal, Paul Roux and Bethlehem.

== Route ==
Detailed Route

The N5 begins in Winburg, at an interchange with the N1 and the R708 north-west of the town centre. It is initially co-signed with the R708 eastwards, bypassing Winburg to the north (where the R709 provides access to the town centre). After 9 kilometres, the R708 becomes its own road south-east towards Marquard, leaving the N5 as the easterly road.

From the R708 split east of Winburg, the N5 heads east for 54 kilometres to the town of Senekal. In Senekal West, the N5 is joined by the R70 from Ventersburg and the R707 from Marquard and they form one road eastwards through the Senekal town centre as Voortrekker Street. After 8 kilometres, east of Senekal, the R707 becomes its own road to the north-east and after another kilometre, the R70 becomes its own road to the south-east.

From the R70 split east of Senekal, the N5 heads eastwards for 60 kilometres, through Paul Roux, to the city of Bethlehem, where it passes through the city centre as two one-way-streets (Muller Street eastwards and Kerk Street westwards). In the Bethlehem City Centre, the N5 meets the R26 and the south-eastern terminus of the R76 at the Commissioner Street junction. The R26 joins the N5 and they are co-signed eastwards through the city centre up to the Hospital Road junction, where the R26 becomes the road northwards and the N5 becomes the road southwards. It turns to the south-east and meets the western terminus of the R712 before crossing the As River.

From Bethlehem, the N5 heads eastwards for 37 kilometres to bypass the town of Kestell and meet the R57 at an off-ramp junction north of the town centre. From Kestell, the N5 heads eastwards for 41 kilometres to meet the north-western terminus of the R74 and enter the city of Harrismith. Just south of the Harrismith City Centre, the N5 crosses the Wilge River and reaches its eastern terminus at an interchange with the N3.

== Junctions ==
The entire route is located within the Free State.

Municipality	Location	km	mi	Exit	Destinations	Notes
Masilonyana	Winburg	0	0	(298)	N1, Kroonstad, Bloemfontein, R708 west, Theunissen	Western end of concurrency with R708
Masilonyana	Winburg	1	1	—	R709, Winburg, Excelsior	At-grade intersection
Masilonyana	Winburg	10	6	—	R708 east, Marquard	At-grade intersection; Eastern end of concurrency with R708
Setsoto	Senekal	64	40	—	R70 north, Ventersburg, R707 south, Marquard	At-grade intersection; Western end of concurrencies with R70 and R707
Setsoto	Senekal	72	45	—	R707 north, Arlington, Lindley	At-grade intersection; Eastern end of concurrency with R707
Setsoto	Senekal	73	45	—	R70 south, Rosendal, Ficksburg	At-grade intersection; Eastern end of concurrency with R70
Dihlabeng	Bethlehem	137	85	—	R76, R26 Commissioner Street south, Bethlehem	At-grade intersection; Western end of concurrency with R26
Dihlabeng	Bethlehem	138	86	—	R26 Hospital Road north, Reitz	At-grade intersection; Eastern end of concurrency with R26
Dihlabeng	Bethlehem	145	90	—	R712, Clarens	At-grade intersection
Maluti-a-Phofung	Kestell	182	113	—	R57, Kestell, Phuthaditjhaba, Reitz	
Maluti-a-Phofung	Harrismith	223	139	—	R74, Phuthaditjhaba, Bergville	At-grade intersection
Maluti-a-Phofung	Harrismith	226	140	226	Murray Street, Wilgepark, Harrismith	
Maluti-a-Phofung	Harrismith	228	142	(29)	N3, Johannesburg, Durban	
N5 ends
