= R708 (South Africa) =

Regional route in South Africa

Regional route R708

Route information
- Length: 323 km (201 mi)

Major junctions
- North-west end: N18 / R370 at Jan Kempdorp
- R506 near Christiana; R59 near Hertzogville; R700 near Bultfontein; R30 in Theunissen; N1 / N5 near Winburg; R709 near Winburg; N5 near Winburg; R707 in Marquard; R703 in Clocolan
- South-east end: R26 near Clocolan

Location
- Country: South Africa

Highway system
- Numbered routes of South Africa
← R707	→ R709

The R708 is a Regional Route in South Africa that connects Jan Kempdorp in the Northern Cape with Clocolan in the Free State via Christiana, Hertzogville, Bultfontein, Theunissen, Winburg and Marquard.

== Route ==
=== North West ===
Its north-western terminus is the N18 at Jan Kempdorp, Northern Cape. It heads eastwards, immediately crossing into the North West, passing through Utlwanang and Geluksoord, to meet the southern terminus of the R506 at Christiana. From that intersection, it flies over the N12, and becomes Voortrekker Street in the town centre and leaves to the south-east, crossing the Vaal River to enter the Free State.

=== Free State ===
The first town it passes through is Hertzogville and just outside the town, the R59 intersects the R708 as a t-junction and both routes are cosigned for 1.8 km southwards before the R708 becomes its own road east-south-east to Bultfontein. At Bultfontein, it intersects the R700 and both routes are cosigned southwards for 1.8 km before the R708 becomes its own road eastwards just south of the town centre and it proceeds to Theunissen.

North of the town, it meets the R30 at a t-junction. Cosigned for 1.4 km, both head southwards before the R708 becomes its own road south-east just north of the Theunissen town centre. From Theunissen, it heads to Winburg. It meets the N1 highway and the N5 national route (at its western origin) just north-west of the town.

From the N1 interchange, it is co-signed with the N5 eastwards for 9 kilometres, bypassing Winburg to the north (where the R709 provides access to the town centre), before diverging and becoming its own road south-east, proceeding to Marquard. At Marquard, it meets the R707's southern terminus. From Marquard, the route heads south-south-east to Clocolan, where it meets the eastern terminus of the R703. It proceeds for a few more kilometres to end at a junction with the R26.
