= R70 (South Africa) =

Provincial route in South Africa

Provincial route R70

Route information
- Maintained by FSDPRT
- Length: 189 km (117 mi)

Major junctions
- Northwest end: R34 in Odendaalsrus
- N1 in Ventersburg; N5 in Senekal
- Southeast end: R26 near Ficksburg

Location
- Country: South Africa
- Major cities: Odendaalsrus, Welkom, Hennenman, Ventersburg, Senekal, Ficksburg

Highway system
- Numbered routes of South Africa
| ← R69 | → R71 |

The R70 is a provincial route in the Free State Province, South Africa that connects Odendaalsrus with Ficksburg via Ventersburg and Senekal.

== Route ==
Detailed Route

The R70 begins in Odendaalsrus, at a roundabout junction with the R34 route south of the town centre. It goes south-east as Church Street and bypasses the Phakisa Freeway circuit. After six kilometres, as the southwards road becomes Alma Road towards Welkom Central, the R70 becomes the road eastwards. After five kilometres, it meets the R730 route (ZR Mahabane Highway) at a junction and enters the Riebeeckstad Suburb of Welkom as Jasons Way.

From the R730 junction, the R70 goes eastwards for twenty three kilometres, through Riebeeckstad, to the town of Hennenman, where it turns to the south-east. From Hennenman, the R70 goes south-east for sixteen kilometres to the town of Ventersburg, where it forms an interchange with the N1 national route.

From Ventersburg, the R70 goes south-east for seventy kilometres to meet the southern terminus of the R720 route. It goes for another seven kilometres southwards, crossing the Sand River, to enter the western part of the town of Senekal and reach a junction with the N5 national route and the R707 route. All three routes become one road eastwards for eight kilometres as Voortrekker Street, through Senekal Central, before the R707 becomes its own road to the north-east. The R70 and N5 remain as one road eastwards for another kilometre before the R70 becomes its own road to the south-east.

The R70 goes southwards for seventy one kilometres, through Rosendal, to reach its south-eastern terminus at a junction with the R26 route just north of Ficksburg.
