= R720 (South Africa) =

Regional route in South Africa

Regional route R720

Route information
- Length: 156 km (97 mi)

Major junctions
- South end: R70 near Senekal
- R76 near Steynsrus; R34 near Edenville; R82 near Koppies; N1 near Koppies
- North end: R721 near Vredefort

Location
- Country: South Africa

Highway system
- Numbered routes of South Africa
← R719	→ R721

The R720 is a Regional Route in Free State, South Africa that connects Vredefort with Senekal via Koppies, Edenville and Steynsrus.

== Route ==
Its northern terminus is a junction with the R721 about 4 km south of Vredefort. From there, it heads south-east, crossing the N1, to reach Koppies, where it meets the R82. The R82 joins the R720 and they are one road south-east for 4 km, crossing the Renoster River, before the R82 becomes its own road south-west. From there, it heads south for 29 km to reach a junction with the R34. It joins the R34 to be co-signed south-west for 7.7 km, reaching Edenville, where it turns east before turning south in the town centre. From Edenville, it heads south for 46 km to Steynsrus, where it crosses the R76. The route continues south for 39 km to end at a junction with the R70 approximately 7 km north of Senekal.
