= Zelotes florisbad =

Florisbad Dark Ground Spider

Conservation status
- Least Concern (SANBI Red List)

Scientific classification
- Kingdom: Animalia
- Phylum: Arthropoda
- Subphylum: Chelicerata
- Class: Arachnida
- Order: Araneae
- Infraorder: Araneomorphae
- Family: Gnaphosidae
- Genus: Zelotes
- Species: Z. florisbad

Binomial name
- Zelotes florisbad FitzPatrick, 2007

Species of spider

Zelotes florisbad is a species of spider in the family Gnaphosidae. It is commonly known as the Florisbad dark ground spider.

== Distribution ==
Zelotes florisbad is endemic to South Africa. It has been recorded from Free State, Northern Cape, and Western Cape, at altitudes ranging from 718 to 2,329 m above sea level.

The species was originally described from Florisbad in the Free State. Other notable locations include Cederberg Wilderness Area, Platberg Nature Reserve, and Rooipoort Nature Reserve.

== Habitat and ecology ==
The species inhabits the Grassland and Nama Karoo biomes. These are free-running ground spiders that are found under stones during the day.

== Conservation ==
Zelotes florisbad is listed as Least Concern by the South African National Biodiversity Institute due to its wide geographic range. There are no significant threats to the species and it is protected in Platberg Nature Reserve, Kalkfonteindam Nature Reserve, Rooipoort Nature Reserve, and Cederberg Wilderness Area.

== Taxonomy ==
The species was described by FitzPatrick in 2007 from Florisbad in the Free State. It is known only from the male.
