= Christoffel Cornelis Froneman =

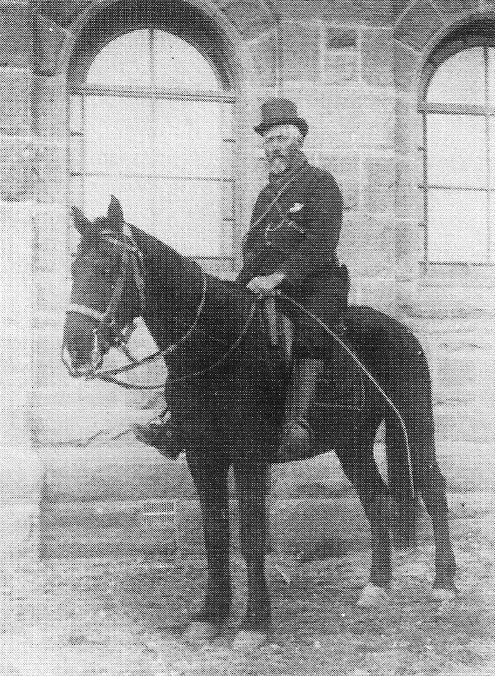
Froneman on horseback. Photograph by Lund Brothers, Kroonstad 1899. Orange Free State Archives.

Christoffel Cornelis Froneman, commonly known as Stoffel Froneman (Leliehoek, Winburg, 26 March 1846 – Cypress, District Marquard, 12 March 1913), was veldkornet, general and Vice-Commander-in-Chief of the Orange Free State Boer forces during the Anglo-Boer War of 1899–1902.

== Family ==
He was the son of Christoffel Cornelius Froneman (Bruintjieshoogte, Somerset East, Eastern Cape, 26 June 1807 – Leliehoek, Winburg, Free State, 14 September 1899) and Maria Elizabeth Opperman (Somerset East, Eastern Cape, 12 December 1817 – Klipspruit, 6 November 1875), and the husband of Anna Catharina Pietersen (Ruigtefontein, Winburg, Free State, 23 May 1852 – Cypress, Marquard, Free State, 9 August 1883) and Heila Magdalena Koekemoer (Rondehoek, Senekal, Free State, 20 August 1859 – Fronemansrust, Marquard, Free State, 2 November 1937). Froneman had one son and five daughters from his first marriage, and three sons and two daughters from his second.

== Military career ==
He took part in the Free State–Basotho Wars (1858–1868) between the Orange Free State and the Sotho people under king Moshoeshoe I.

=== Anglo-Boer War ===
At the outbreak of the war in 1899 he was Commandant of the Ladybrand Commando. He distinguished himself to such an extent that his promotions followed each other in quick succession.

In early February 1900, together with Generaal de Wet, he took part in the Battle of Koedoesberg (near Ritchie, South Africa), west of the Boer positions at Magersfontein. When General Piet Cronjé surrendered at Paardeberg on 27 February 1900, Froneman, with the help of General De Wet, managed to escape and was promoted to General. Near Sannapos (Afrikaans: Slag van Sannaspos, 31 March 1900) and in the Battle near Brandwaterkom (Brandwater Basin) he really excelled. Near Pompje he raided a train and all over the region he caused havoc for the British and inflicted great damage. On 7 June 1900 he attacked Roodewal railway station with De Wet and Lucas Steenkamp's troops, 50 kilometers north of Kroonstad, and captured large quantities of British munitions, provisions, blankets and clothing loaded onto a train for Pretoria.

By 1901 he was the Vice-Commander-In-Chief for the entire Eastern Orange Free State. Froneman fought until the end of the Anglo-Boer War and took part in the Peace Treaty negotiations in Vereeniging, where he voted for peace.

On 11 June 1902 General Froneman and about 800 Boer commandos surrendered near Winburg to General Elliott. Nearly every one handed in a rifle with bandoliers, but, like other commandos which had come in, they spent nearly all their ammunition in game-shooting since peace was declared. The Boer generals and the commandants and Field Cornets were allowed to retain their private rifles.

== Literature ==
- M. P. Bossenbroek, Yvette Rosenberg (Translator), The Boer War, Seven Stories Press, New York, NY, 2018. ISBN 9781609807474, 1609807472. Pages 233, 255, 273, 316, and 321.
- Breytenbach, J. H. (1977). Die Boereterugtog uit Kaapland [The Boer retreat from the Cape Colony]. Die Geskiedenis van die Tweede Vryheidsoorlog in Suid-Afrika, 1899-1902 (in Afrikaans). Vol. IV. Pretoria: Die Staatsdrukker. Pages 133, 136, 192, 194, 210-211, 214, 216, 244-245, 258, 279-281, 321, 324, 331, 332 note, 346, 350, 365, 379, 385-386, 466, 471, 478, photo 32.
- Breytenbach, J. H. (1983). Die Britse Opmars tot in Pretoria [The British advance to Pretoria]. Die Geskiedenis van die Tweede Vryheidsoorlog in Suid-Afrika, 1899-1902 (in Afrikaans). Vol. V. Pretoria: Die Staatsdrukker. ISBN 9780621083606. OCLC 769254652. Page 72, 116, 192-193, 214-219, 229, 237-238, 240-243, 246, 250, 266-269, 278, 298, 304-307, 316-317.
- Breytenbach, J. H. (1996). Die beleg van Mafeking tot met die Slag van Bergendal [The siege of Mafeking up to the Battle of Bergendal]. Die Geskiedenis van die Tweede Vryheidsoorlog in Suid-Afrika, 1899-1902 (in Afrikaans). Vol. VI. Pretoria: Die Staatsdrukker. ISBN 9780797033214. OCLC 813492747. Pages 222, 224, 227, 229-230, 233-234, 238.
- Thomas Pakenham, The Boer War, George Weidenfeld & Nicolson, London, 1979. Abacus, 1992. ISBN 0 349 10466 2. Pages 393, 435, 488 and 567.
