= R711 road =

R711 road may refer to:

- R711 road (Ireland)
- R711 (South Africa)
