= R26 (South Africa) =

Road in South Africa

Provincial route R26

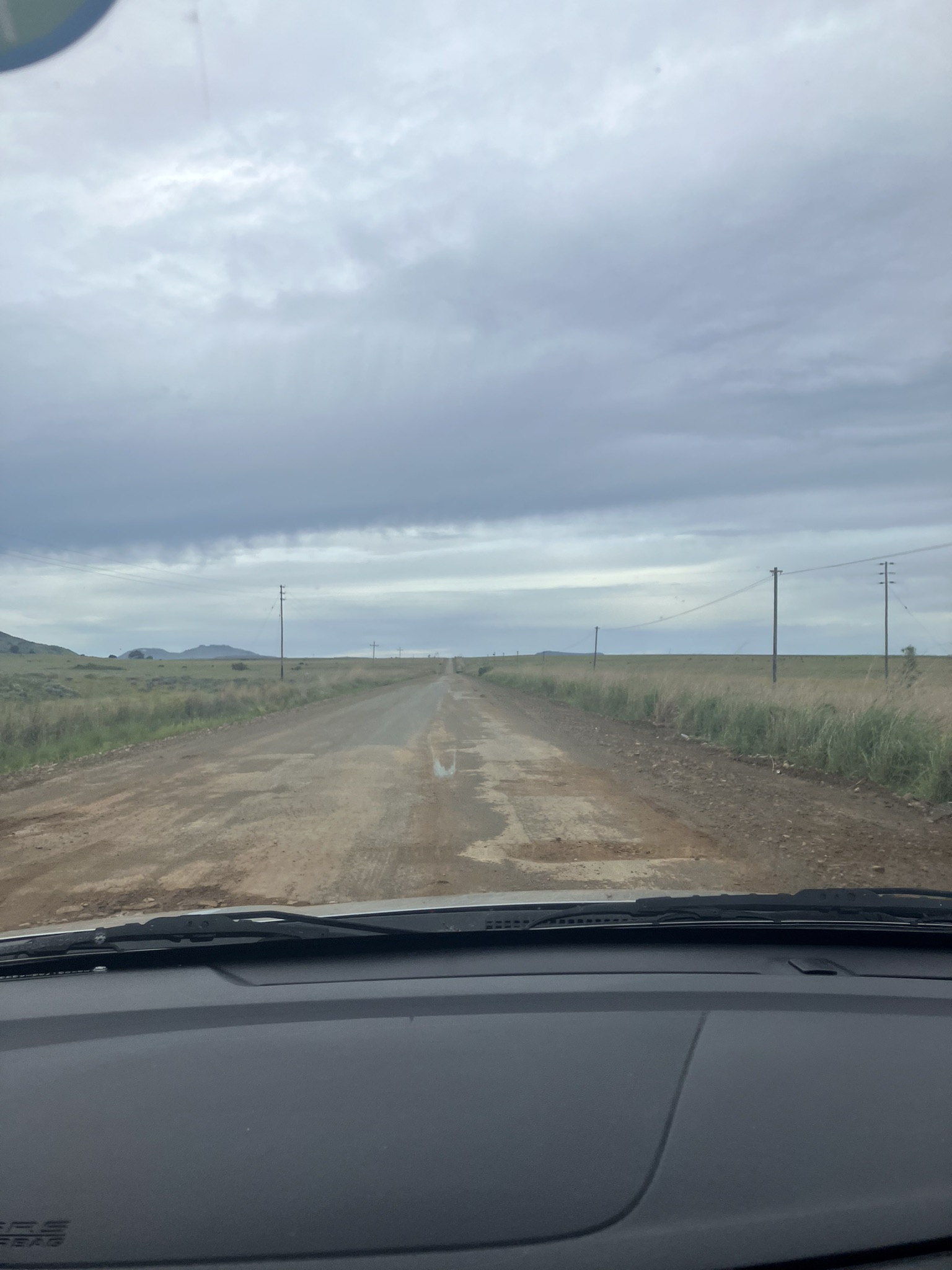

Route information
- Maintained by SANRAL and FSDPRT
- Length: 491 km (305 mi)

Major junctions
- South end: N6 in Rouxville
- N8 near Ladybrand; R70 near Ficksburg; N5 / R76 in Bethlehem; R57 near Reitz; R34 near Frankfort
- North end: N3 near Villiers

Location
- Country: South Africa
- Major cities: Rouxville; Zastron; Wepener; Ladybrand; Clocolan; Ficksburg; Fouriesburg; Bethlehem; Reitz; Frankfort; Villiers

Highway system
- Numbered routes of South Africa
← R25	→ R27

The R26 is a provincial route in Free State, South Africa that connects Rouxville with Villiers via Zastron, Wepener, Ladybrand, Ficksburg, Bethlehem & Reitz.

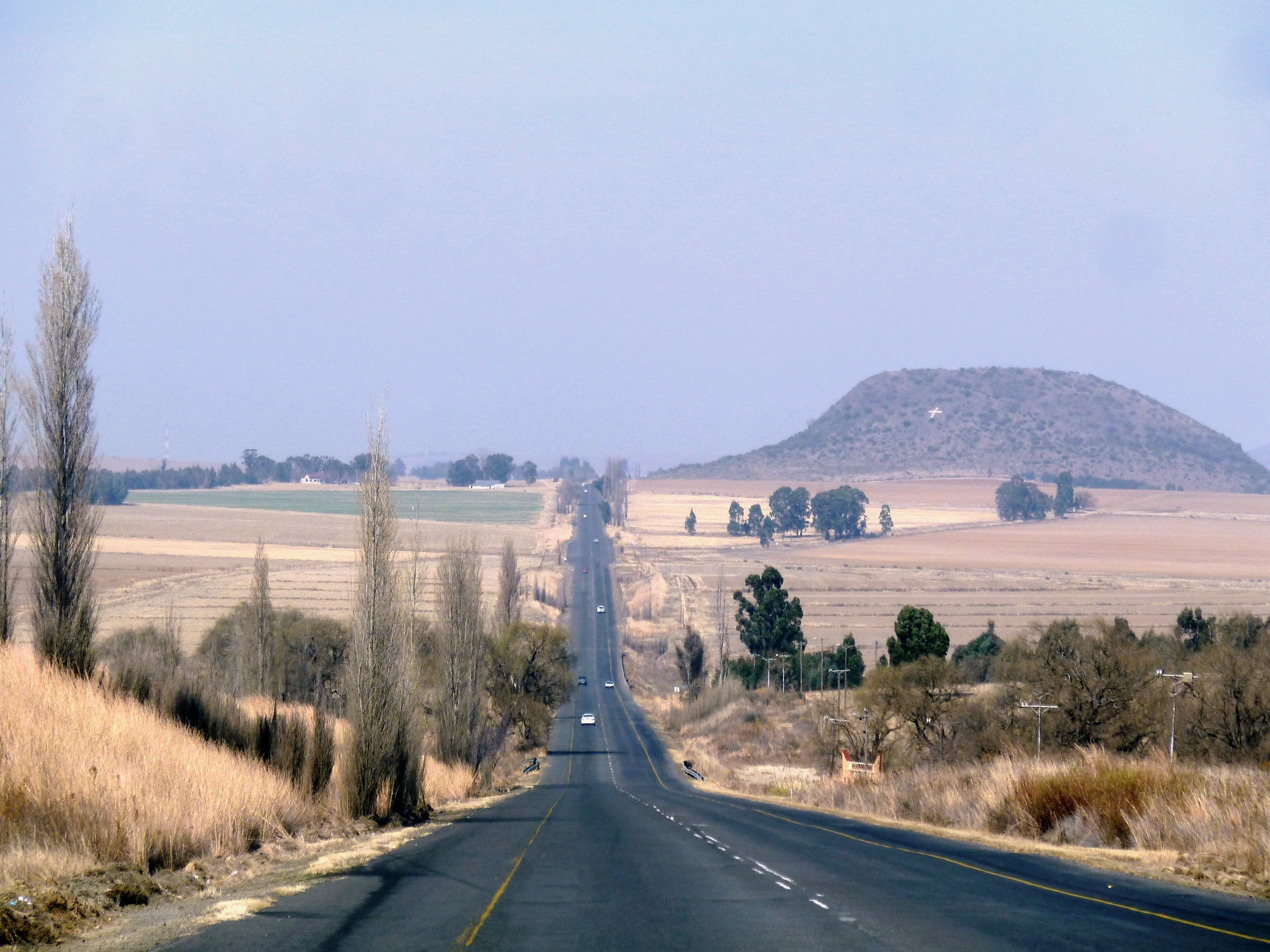
Route R26 near Reitz, Free State

== Route ==
Detailed Route

The R26 begins in the town of Rouxville, at a t-junction with the N6 national route. It begins by going north-east for 30 kilometres to meet the north-western terminus of the R726 road and bypass the town of Zastron. From Zastron, the R26 goes northwards for 65 kilometres, following the borderline with Lesotho, through Van Stadensrus, to the town of Wepener near the Van Rooyen's Gate border with Lesotho, where it meets the R702 road. The R702 & R26 become one road for 8 kilometres westwards. Just after crossing the Caledon River, at the northern terminus of the R701 road (a four-way junction), the R702 remains as the road westwards while the R26 turns northwards.

The R26 continues north-east, still following the Lesotho borderline, for 28 kilometres to the town of Hobhouse, where it meets the southern terminus of the R709 road. From Hobhouse, the R26 goes north-east for 40 kilometres to reach a junction with the N8 national route. They form one road eastwards for 12 kilometres before the N8 becomes its own road southwards towards Maseru while the R26 turns northwards and bypasses the town of Ladybrand to the east.

From Ladybrand, the R26 continues northwards for 35 kilometres to the town of Clocolan, where it meets the south-eastern terminus of the R708 road. From Clocolan, the R26 goes eastwards for 30 kilometres to the town of Ficksburg, which is another border point into Lesotho. Just after Ficksburg, the R26 meets the south-eastern terminus of the R70 road. From the R70 junction, the R26 goes north-east for 40 kilometres, following the Lesotho borderline again, to the town of Fouriesburg, where it meets the western terminus of the R711 road.

From Fouriesburg, the R26 goes northwards for 48 kilometres to the city of Bethlehem. At the intersection with the N5 national route in Bethlehem, where it meets the southern terminus of the R76 road, the R26 joins the N5 eastwards for a few kilometres up to the Hospital Road junction, where the N5 becomes the road southwards and the R26 becomes the road northwards. It turns to the north-east and meets the western end of the R714 road just after.

From the R714 junction in Bethlehem, the R26 goes northwards for 48 kilometres to bypass the town of Reitz and intersect with the R57 road. From the R57 junction, the R26 proceeds northwards for 58 kilometres, bypassing Tweeling, to reach an intersection with the R34 road. The R26 & R34 become one road eastwards, crossing the Wilge River into the town of Frankfort.

East of Frankfort, the R26 becomes its own road, going north-north-east for 28 kilometres, meeting the eastern terminus of the R716 road, to the town of Villiers, where it ends at an off-ramp junction with the N3 national route and the R103 route just north of the N3's Wilge Toll Plaza and just south of the N3's Vaal River Bridge.
