= Masilonyana Local Municipality elections =

Local elections in the Free State, South Africa

The Masilonyana Local Municipality council consists of nineteen members elected by mixed-member proportional representation. Ten councillors are elected by first-past-the-post voting in ten wards, while the remaining nine are chosen from party lists so that the total number of party representatives is proportional to the number of votes received.

In the 2026 South African municipal elections the African National Congress (ANC) lost its majority, but remains the largest party.

== Results ==
The following table shows the composition of the council after past elections.

Event	ANC	DA	EFF	FF+	Other	Total
2000 election	14	3	—	—	2	19
2006 election	17	2	—	1	0	20
2011 election	16	2	—	1	1	20
2016 election	12	4	2	1	0	19
2021 election	11	4	2	1	1	19
2026 election	7	6	1	1	4	19

== December 2000 election ==
The following table shows the results of the 2000 election.

Party	Ward			List			Total seats
Party	Votes	%	Seats	Votes	%	Seats	Total seats
African National Congress	10,947	76.76	10	10,982	76.93	4	14
Democratic Alliance	2,168	15.20	0	2,254	15.79	3	3
Pan Africanist Congress of Azania	611	4.28	0	551	3.86	1	1
Alliance 2000+	536	3.76	0	489	3.43	1	1
Total	14,262	100.00	10	14,276	100.00	9	19
Valid votes	14,262	97.31		14,276	97.53		
Invalid/blank votes	395	2.69		361	2.47		
Total votes	14,657	100.00		14,637	100.00		
Registered voters/turnout	30,214	48.51		30,214	48.44		

== March 2006 election ==
The following table shows the results of the 2006 election.

Party	Ward			List			Total seats
Party	Votes	%	Seats	Votes	%	Seats	Total seats
African National Congress	11,725	82.76	10	11,850	82.95	7	17
Democratic Alliance	1,428	10.08	0	1,402	9.81	2	2
Freedom Front Plus	493	3.48	0	530	3.71	1	1
Pan Africanist Congress of Azania	362	2.56	0	304	2.13	0	0
African Christian Democratic Party	132	0.93	0	199	1.39	0	0
Independent candidates	28	0.20	0				0
Total	14,168	100.00	10	14,285	100.00	10	20
Valid votes	14,168	97.27		14,285	97.39		
Invalid/blank votes	397	2.73		383	2.61		
Total votes	14,565	100.00		14,668	100.00		
Registered voters/turnout	31,987	45.53		31,987	45.86		

== May 2011 election ==
The following table shows the results of the 2011 election.

Party	Ward			List			Total seats
Party	Votes	%	Seats	Votes	%	Seats	Total seats
African National Congress	13,240	79.21	10	13,356	77.90	6	16
Democratic Alliance				2,666	15.55	2	2
Freedom Front Plus	1,857	11.11	0	518	3.02	1	1
Congress of the People	412	2.46	0	514	3.00	1	1
Independent candidates	915	5.47	0				0
Pan Africanist Congress of Azania	292	1.75	0	92	0.54	0	0
Total	16,716	100.00	10	17,146	100.00	10	20
Valid votes	16,716	96.21		17,146	98.39		
Invalid/blank votes	658	3.79		281	1.61		
Total votes	17,374	100.00		17,427	100.00		
Registered voters/turnout	31,884	54.49		31,884	54.66		

== August 2016 election ==
The following table shows the results of the 2016 election.

Party	Ward			List			Total seats
Party	Votes	%	Seats	Votes	%	Seats	Total seats
African National Congress	11,429	63.80	10	11,515	64.36	2	12
Democratic Alliance	3,902	21.78	0	3,913	21.87	4	4
Economic Freedom Fighters	1,644	9.18	0	1,751	9.79	2	2
Freedom Front Plus	431	2.41	0	423	2.36	1	1
Congress of the People	149	0.83	0	137	0.77	0	0
Independent candidates	260	1.45	0				0
African People's Convention	100	0.56	0	153	0.86	0	0
Total	17,915	100.00	10	17,892	100.00	9	19
Valid votes	17,915	98.52		17,892	98.44		
Invalid/blank votes	269	1.48		283	1.56		
Total votes	18,184	100.00		18,175	100.00		
Registered voters/turnout	31,153	58.37		31,153	58.34		

== November 2021 election ==
The following table shows the results of the 2021 election.

Party	Ward			List			Total seats
Party	Votes	%	Seats	Votes	%	Seats	Total seats
African National Congress	6,793	52.97	9	7,286	56.67	2	11
Democratic Alliance	2,455	19.14	1	2,801	21.78	3	4
Economic Freedom Fighters	1,171	9.13	0	1,536	11.95	2	2
Independent candidates	1,426	11.12	0				0
Freedom Front Plus	701	5.47	0	676	5.26	1	1
Forum for Service Delivery	102	0.80	0	196	1.52	1	1
African Transformation Movement	116	0.90	0	127	0.99	0	0
United Independent Movement	61	0.48	0	115	0.89	0	0
African Content Movement				121	0.94	0	0
Total	12,825	100.00	10	12,858	100.00	9	19
Valid votes	12,825	97.53		12,858	97.56		
Invalid/blank votes	325	2.47		322	2.44		
Total votes	13,150	100.00		13,180	100.00		
Registered voters/turnout	29,408	44.72		29,408	44.82		

== November 2026 election ==
The following table shows the results of the 2026 election.

Party	Ward			List			Total seats
Party	Votes	%	Seats	Votes	%	Seats	Total seats
African National Congress	6,176	37.40	6	6,192	37.46	1	7
Democratic Alliance	4,966	30.07	4	5,009	30.31	2	6
Economic Freedom Fighters	1,047	6.34	0	1,086	6.57	1	1
Congress of Masilonyana	1,006	6.09	0	1,019	6.17	1	1
South African Communist Party	898	5.44	0	891	5.39	1	1
Black and White Society	786	4.76	0	761	4.60	1	1
Freedom Front Plus	639	3.87	0	713	4.31	1	1
African Independent Congress	241	1.46	0	243	1.47	1	1
United Residents Front	218	1.32	0	207	1.25	0	0
African Transformation Movement	186	1.13	0	212	1.28	0	0
Afrika Mayibuye Movement	92	0.56	0	78	0.47	0	0
Patriotic Alliance	44	0.27	0	54	0.33	0	0
Africa's New Dawn	53	0.32	0	39	0.24	0	0
uMkhonto weSizwe Party	78	0.47	0				0
African Congress for Transformation	56	0.34	0				0
Pan Africanist Congress of Azania	28	0.17	0	24	0.15	0	0
Total	16,514	100.00	10	16,528	100.00	9	19
Valid votes	16,514	97.88		16,528	97.79		
Invalid/blank votes	357	2.12		373	2.21		
Total votes	16,871	100.00		16,901	100.00		
Registered voters/turnout	32,585	51.78		32,585	51.87		
