= R700 =

R700 may refer to:

- R700 (South Africa), a Regional Route between Hoopstad and Bloemfontein
- Radeon R700, a graphics processing unit
- Remington 700, a bolt-action rifle
- R-700 Refrigerant, a non-organic refrigerant series
