= R700 (South Africa) =

Regional route in South Africa

Regional route R700

Route information
- Maintained by FSDPRT
- Length: 152 km (94 mi)

Major junctions
- North end: R59 at Hoopstad
- R710 in Bultfontein; R708 in Bultfontein; R703 near Soutpan; N1 in Bloemfontein
- South end: N8 in Bloemfontein

Location
- Country: South Africa
- Major cities: Hoopstad, Bultfontein, Bloemfontein

Highway system
- Numbered routes of South Africa
| ← R624 | → R701 |

The R700 is a regional route in Free State, South Africa that connects Hoopstad with Bloemfontein via Bultfontein and Soutpan.

== Route ==
The R700's northern terminus is a junction with the R59 route at Hoopstad (just south of the R59's Vet River bridge; which provides access to the town centre). It begins by running south-south-east for 53 km to the town of Bultfontein, where it meets the south-western terminus of the R710 route and continues southwards via a right turn. It bypasses Bultfontein to the west and reaches a junction with the R708 route. The R708 joins the R700 for 1.8 km southwards before the R708 becomes its own road eastwards while the R700 remains facing southwards.

From Bultfontein, the R700 heads southwards for 46 km to reach a junction with the R703 route near the town of Soutpan. The R703 joins the R700 southwards for 1.2 km, bypassing Soutpan to the east, before the R703 becomes its own road eastwards while the R700 continues southwards. From Soutpan, the R700 continues southwards for 40 km, bypassing Florisbad and passing through the eastern part of the Soetdoring Nature Reserve (where it crosses the Modder River), to reach a junction with the N1 highway (Bloemfontein Western Bypass) and enter the city of Bloemfontein as Kenneth Kaunda Road. It proceeds southwards through Bayswater and Arboretum to end in Bloemfontein Central at an intersection with the N8 national route.
