= R709 road =

R709 road may refer to:

- R709 road (Ireland)
- R709 (South Africa)
