= R76 (South Africa) =

Provincial route in South Africa

Provincial route R76

Route information
- Maintained by FSDPRT
- Length: 231 km (144 mi)

Major junctions
- Northwest end: R30 near Orkney
- R59 in Viljoenskroon; N1 / R34 in Kroonstad
- Southeast end: N5 / R26 in Bethlehem

Location
- Country: South Africa
- Major cities: Viljoenskroon, Kroonstad, Steynsrus, Lindley, Bethlehem

Highway system
- Numbered routes of South Africa
← R75	→ R80

The R76 is a provincial route in Free State, South Africa that connects Orkney with Bethlehem via Kroonstad.

== Route ==
Detailed Route

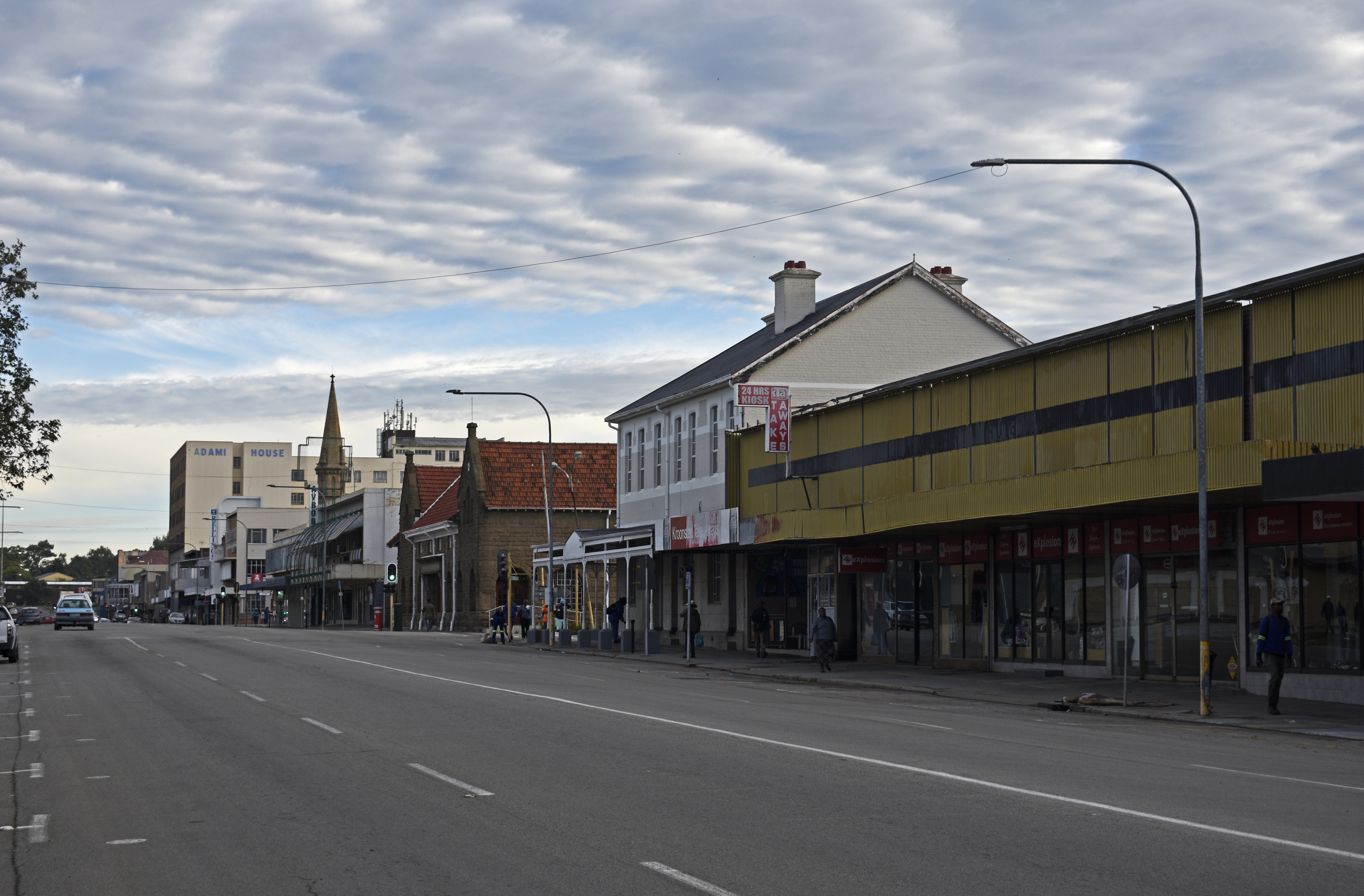
R76 in Kroonstad

The R76 begins at a T-junction with the R30 road just north-west of Vierfontein, approximately 4.5 kilometres south of the R30 bridge on the Vaal River, which provides access to the town of Orkney in the North West on the other side.

It begins by going east, then south-east, for twenty-nine kilometres to meet the R59 road in the town of Viljoenskroon. After separating Rammulotsi from Viljoenskroon Central, the R76 continues south-south-east for sixty kilometres, meeting the eastern terminus of the R727 road, to enter the town of Kroonstad.

It passes through Kroonstad's Wespark suburb before reaching a roundabout in the suburb of Kroonheuwel, where it turns southwards. It passes through Kroonstad CBD as Cross Street and crosses the Vals River just after. After passing through the Wilgenhof suburb as South Road, it forms an interchange with the R34/N1 national route and proceeds to leave Kroonstad south-eastwards.

From the N1/R34 interchange, the R76 continues south-east for forty-four kilometres to meet the R720 road in the town of Steynsrus. It continues for thirty-six kilometres eastwards to bypass the town of Lindley to the south and meet the R707 road. It continues south-east for fifty-four kilometres to end at a junction with the N5 national route and the R26 road in Bethlehem.
