= Verkeerdevlei =

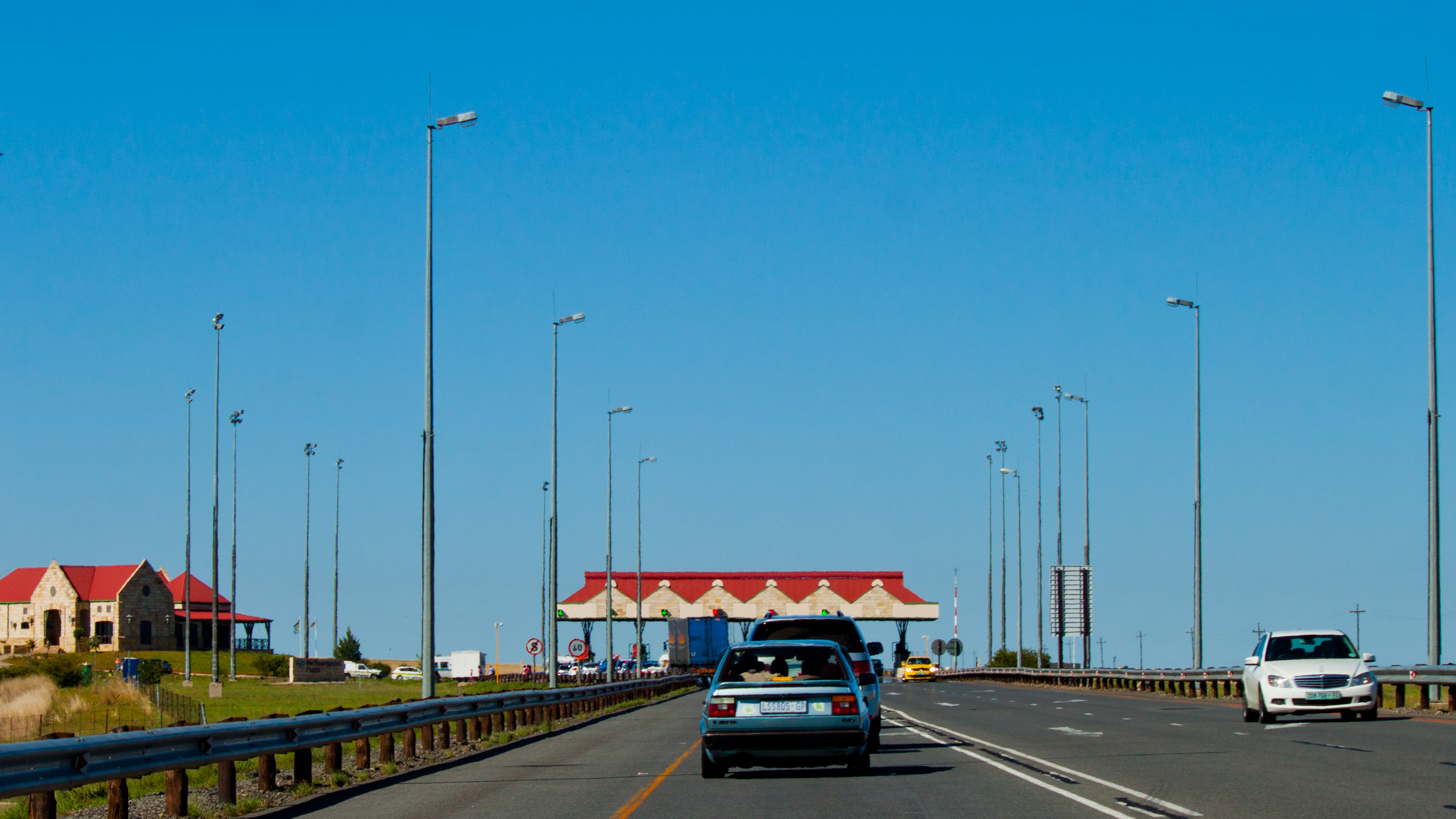
- The N1-tollgate near Verkeerdevlei

- Location within Free State (South African province) Location within South Africa
- Coordinates: 28°50′S 26°47′E
- Country: South Africa
- Province: Free State
- District: Lejweleputswa
- Municipality: Masilonyana

Area
  - Total: 7.9 km^{2} (3.1 sq mi)

Population (2011)
  - Total: 2,135
  - Density: 270/km^{2} (700/sq mi)

Racial makeup (2011)
  - Black African: 95.0%
  - Coloured: 0.7%
  - Indian/Asian: 0.3%
  - White: 3.7%
  - Other: 0.3%

First languages (2011)
  - Sotho: 78.4%
  - Xhosa: 5.5%
  - Afrikaans: 5.3%
  - Tswana: 4.2%
  - Other: 6.6%
- Time zone: UTC+2 (SAST)
- Postal code (street): 9401
- PO box: 9401
- Area code: 051

Verkeerdevlei is a small town in the Free State province of South Africa.

Town 39 km south-east of Brandfort. Afrikaans for ‘wrong marsh’, the name probably refers to an east-west flow of water in an area where the direction is normally west-east.

Verkeerdevlei is approximately 8 km east of the N1 national road on the R703 regional route. The toll gate near Verkeerdevlei on the N1 national road is named after the town. East of Verkeerdevlei on the R703 road is the town of Excelsior.
