= Florisbad Skull =

Hominin fossil

Coordinates: 28°46′S 26°04′E

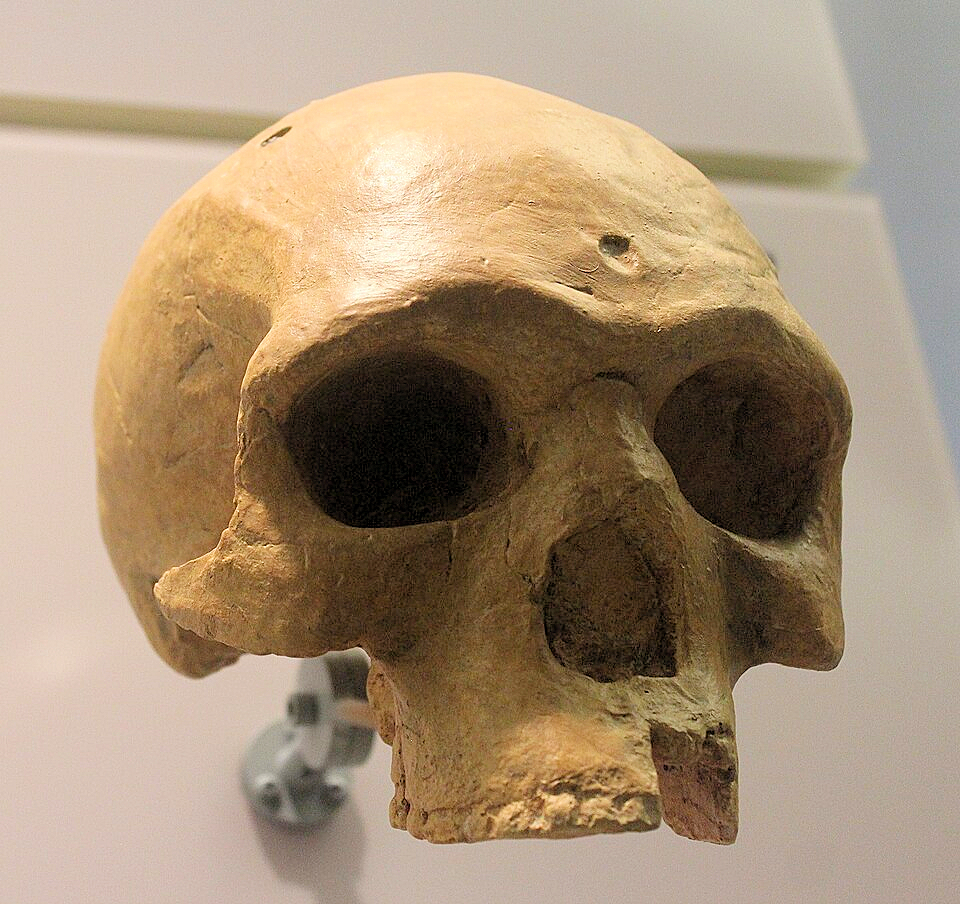
- Common name: Florisbad Skull
- Species: Homo sapiens or Homo helmei or Homo heidelbergensis
- Age: 259±35 ka
- Place discovered: Florisbad archaeological and paleontological site, South Africa
- Date discovered: 1932
- Discovered by: Thomas F. Dreyer, G. Venter

The Florisbad Skull is an important human fossil of the early Middle Stone Age, representing either late Homo heidelbergensis or early Homo sapiens. It was discovered in 1932 by T. F. Dreyer at the Florisbad site, Free State Province, South Africa.

== Research history ==
=== Discovery ===
In 1835, early voortrekkers discovered a lithium spring by the Haagenstad saltpan, which was settled by Hendrik Venter. After his death, his grandson Floris commercialised the site, and Florisbad became a regionally famous bath. In 1912, during excavations into an adjacent hillock to expand the bath, workers discovered animal fossils and stone tools. English professor Geo Potts and South African palaeontologist Robert Broom were sent by the National Museum, Bloemfontein, to investigate. They were able to study the material collected by Venter's wife, Martha Johanna Venter, and Broom suggested further excavation might yield human fossils. In 1917, South African zoologist Thomas Frederik Dreyer made a collection of fossil animal teeth recovered from the bath gravel. He returned in 1926 with Captain Robert Egerton Helme where they discovered Sivatherium molars, and in 1928 with A. Lyle where they recovered several more fossils and stone tools. In 1932, Dreyer investigated spring vent deposits, where he discovered a partial human skull alongside more fossil animals and stone tools.

The Florisbad skull was the first human fossil found in Africa directly associated with either stone tools or extinct animals. Dreyer and Dutch neurologist Cornelius Ubbo Ariëns Kappers described the skull in 1935.

=== Classification ===
In 1935, Dreyer speculatively reconstructed the complete Florisbad Skull, and claimed that it belonged to an extremely lowly race, going so far as to classify it as a new species and subgenus as Homo (Africanthropus) helmei — naming it after Captain Helme. Kappers, on the other hand, drew parallels between the braincase of the Florisbad Skull and "H. sapiens fossilis" (Cro-Magnon), and preferred to consider it a type of modern human.

Dreyer lent the skull to South African anthropologist Matthew Robertson Drennan for study, who published a paper soon after. Drennan believed that, while the face resembled the Zambian Kabwe 1 (the "Rhodesian Man", classified as a primitive stock of modern human), the braincase better aligned with Neanderthals. He was also influenced by the opinion of South African archaeologist Astley John Hilary Goodwin, who identified a Mousterian-like stone tool culture at the site and around South Africa — a culture which is associated with European Neanderthals. Drennan opted to classify the Florisbad Skull as "H. florisbadensis (helmei)", characterising it as an ancient African Neanderthal variant. In 1936, Dreyer published a correction after comparing the Florisbad braincase with that of a modern South Africa bushman, and reconsidered it as an early representative of the Bushman Race. Nonetheless, in 1937, Drennan reaffirmed that the Florisbad Skull measurements, "cry out for a Neanderthal interpretation."

That same year, Scottish anatomist Alexander Galloway criticised Drennan's focus on skull measurements over anatomical landmarks. He instead compared the Florisbad Skull to the "ferocious appearance" of the male Aboriginal Australian skull, as well as the South African Middle Pleistocene Boskop Man (at the time considered to be an ancestor of South African bushmen), remarking that, "there are so many features which are common to all three that two-thirds of the Florisbad features are encountered in the modern Australian skull and two-thirds in the Boskop." He considered the Florisbad Skull a proto-Australian, along with specimens such as Rhodesian Man and the Javan Solo Man. He also raised the possibility that it was an ancestor of the Javan Wadjak Man, which British anatomist Arthur Keith had earlier characterised, "as an offshoot from the stem which afterwards diverged into Australian and Negro types." In 1958, South African palaeontologist Ronald Singer compared the Florisbad Skull with the recently discovered South African Saldanha Man, and similarly grouped them with the Rhodesian Man as ancestors of modern bushmen.

In 1978, American biological anthropologist G. Phillip Rightmire made his own reconstruction of the Florisbad Skull without speculating on the dimensions of missing pieces, and found that it is substantially distinct from any living population. He did not believe the Florisbad Skull, or any other "archaic H. sapiens", were ancestral to one specific population. He classified it as part of the same stock as Kabwe 1 (at this point, H. sapiens rhodesiensis) and possibly the Ethiopian Omo remains.

Clarke (1985) compared it to Laetoli Hominid 18 and Omo 2, which are now considered early anatomically modern human (H. sapiens) fossils. The difficulty of placing the fossil in either H. heidelbergensis or H. sapiens prompted McBrearty and Brooks (2000) to revive the designation H. helmei. In 2016 Chris Stringer argued that the Florisbad Skull, along with the Jebel Irhoud and Eliye Springs specimens, belong to an archaic or "early" form of Homo sapiens. The Florisbad Skull was also classified as Homo sapiens by Hublin et al. (in 2017), in part on the basis of the similar Jebel Irhoud finds from Morocco. Scerri et al. (2018) adduce the fossil as evidence for "African multiregionalism", the view of a complex speciation of H. sapiens widely dispersed across Africa, with substantial hybridization between H. sapiens and more divergent hominins in different regions. Lahr and Mounier (2019) also classify the Florisbad Skull as an example of early H. sapiens, which they suggest arose between 350,000 and 260,000 years ago from the merging of populations in East and South Africa.

== Description ==
The Florisbad Skull belonged to a specimen within the size range of modern humans, with a brain volume larger than modern averages, at 1,440 cm^{3}. The skull was also found with Middle Stone Age tools.

The fossil skull is a fragment; preserved are the right side of the face, most of the frontal bone, and some of the maxilla, along with portions of the roof and sidewalls. A single, upper right, third molar was also found with the adult skull.

The skull also showed extensive porotic hyperostosis as well as a large number of healed lesions, including pathological drainage or vascular tracts. There are also a couple of large puncture marks and scratch-like marks which may reflect hyena chewing.

Based on enamel samples from the tooth found with the skull, the fossil has been directly dated by electron spin resonance dating to around between 259±35 ka (between 294,000 and 224,000 years old).

== Context ==
The partial cranium is part of an assemblage of mostly carnivore prey remains, caught in vertical spring vents. It shows damage by hyena chewing. The spring vents were later sealed by deposits. "Peat II" is a deposit of dark organic clay representing a Middle Stone Age land surface, showing a human occupation horizon dated 121±6 ka.

The wider Florisbad site has also produced a large and diverse fauna. The assemblage including micro-vertebrates from springhares, rabbits, rodents and reptiles has informed researchers on the paleoenvironment of the interior of South Africa in the Middle Pleistocene. The large mammal component of the site suggests an open grassland with a body of water in the immediate vicinity. Although many specimens are dated by comparisons of faunal assemblages, this method does not prove to have accurate chronological resolution for much of the last million years.

== See also ==
- List of human evolution fossils
- Middle Stone Age
