= Meqheleng =

Meqheleng is one of four townships within the jurisdiction of the Setsoto Local Municipality in the Free State province of South Africa. The township of Meqheleng adjoins the town of Ficksburg and is located right on the national border between South Africa and the Kingdom of Lesotho.. According to the 2011 Census conducted by Statistics South Africa (Stats SA), Meqheleng had a total population of 35,848 residents, of whom 94.6% reported Sesotho as their primary home language..
