= R712 (South Africa) =

Regional route in South Africa

Regional route R712

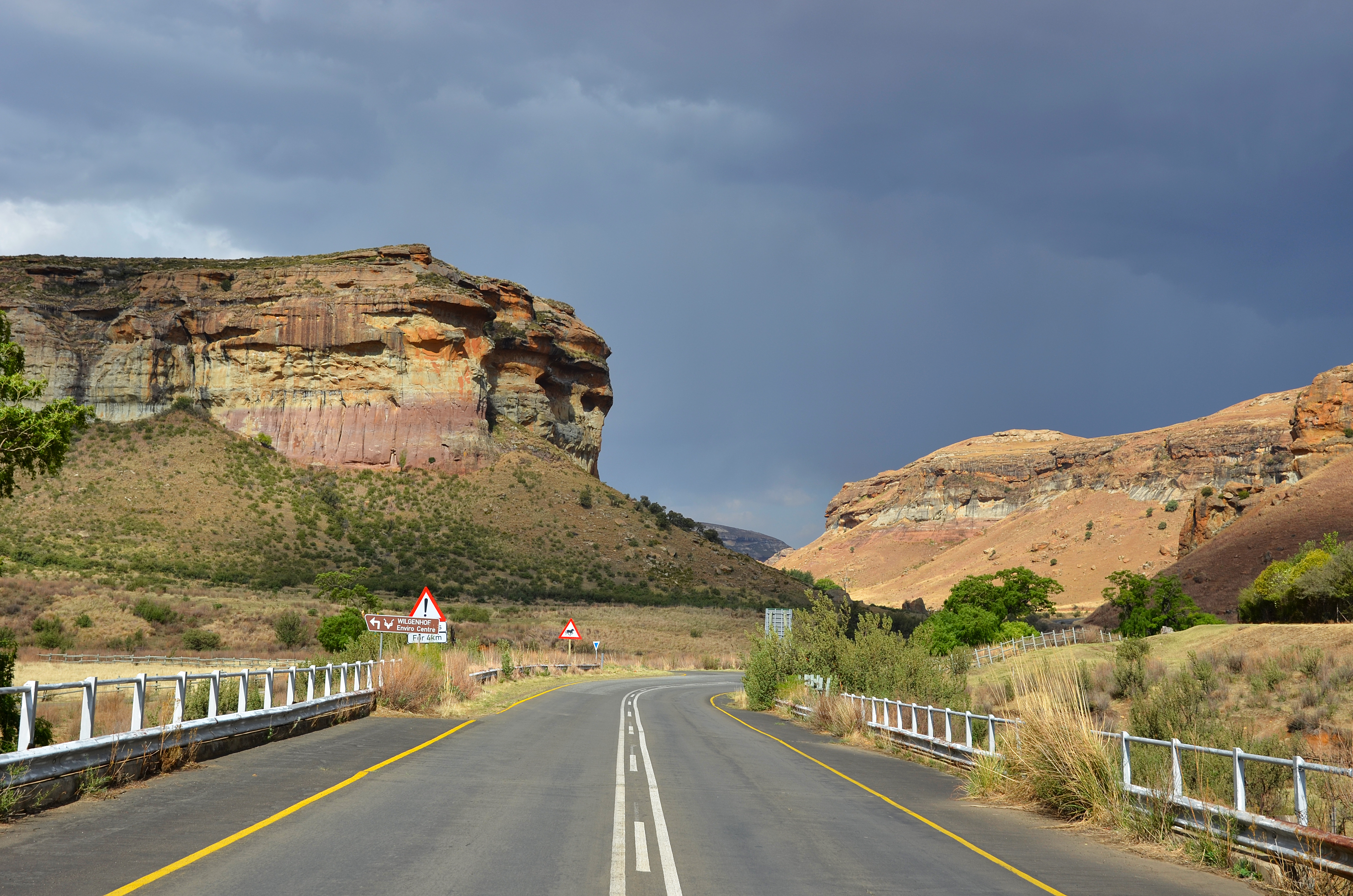
- In the Golden Gate Highlands

Route information
- Length: 107 km (66 mi)

Major junctions
- East end: R74 near Harrismith
- R57 near Phuthaditjhaba; R711 at Clarens
- West end: N5 near Bethlehem

Location
- Country: South Africa

Highway system
- Numbered routes of South Africa
← R711	→ R713

The R712 is a Regional Route in South Africa that connects Phuthaditjhaba with Bethlehem via the Golden Gate Highlands National Park and Clarens.

== Route ==
The R712's eastern terminus is a junction with the R74 approximately 9 kilometres south of Harrismith. From there, it heads west-south-west for 29 kilometres to cross the R57 just north of Phuthaditjhaba (adjacent to the University of the Free State Qwaqwa campus). From the R57 intersection, it runs west for 48 kilometres, through the Golden Gate Highlands National Park, to reach Clarens, where it meets the northern terminus of the R711. From the R711 junction, the R712 turns northwards and heads for 29 kilometres to reach its end at a junction with the N5 just east of Bethlehem.
