= Florisbad =

- Location within Free State (South African province) Location within South Africa
- Coordinates: 28.766°S 26.083°E
- Country: South Africa
- Province: Free State
- District: Lejweleputswa
- Municipality: Masilonyana
- Time zone: UTC+2 (SAST)

Florisbad is a health resort 45 km northwest of Bloemfontein and 47 km south-west of Brandfort (just south of Soutpan), near the Haagenstad salt-pan. Named after Floris Venter who opened up the mineral spring. Florisbad archaeological and paleontological site is now a tourist attraction.
