= R721 (South Africa) =

Regional route in South Africa

Regional route R721

Route information
- Length: 74.7 km (46.4 mi)

Major junctions
- South end: N1 / R34 at Kroonstad
- R720 near Vredefort
- North end: R59 at Vredefort

Location
- Country: South Africa

Highway system
- Numbered routes of South Africa
← R720	→ R722

The R721 is a Regional Route in Free State, South Africa that connects Kroonstad with Vredefort. It was formerly part of the N1 national route, before the Kroonvaal Toll Route was constructed.

== Route ==
The R721's northern terminus is a junction with the R59 in Vredefort. From there, it heads south for 5 km to meet the north-western terminus of the R720. It continues southwards for 70 km to Kroonstad, where it ends at an interchange with the R34 and the N1 highway north of the city centre.

This route from Vredefort to Kroonstad was formerly part of the N1, before the construction of the Kroonvaal Toll Route.
