= R709 (South Africa) =

Regional route in South Africa

Regional route R709

Route information
- Length: 124 km (77 mi)

Major junctions
- North end: N5 / R708 at Winburg
- R703 in Excelsior; N8 near Tweespruit
- South end: R26 at Hobhouse

Location
- Country: South Africa
- Towns: Winburg; Excelsior; Tweespruit; Hobhouse

Highway system
- Numbered routes of South Africa
← R708	→ R710

The R709 is a Regional Route in Free State, South Africa that connects Winburg with Hobhouse via Excelsior and Tweespruit.

== Route ==
Its northern terminus is a junction with the N5 and the R708 north of Winburg. From here, it runs south through the Winburg town centre before leaving the town. The first town it passes through is Excelsior, where it meets the R703 at a staggered intersection. Continuing south, it passes through Tweespruit, then crosses the N8. The route ends at Hobhouse, at a junction with the R26.
