= Soutpan =

- Location within Free State (South African province) Location within South Africa
- Coordinates: 28.746°S 26.072°E
- Country: South Africa
- Province: Free State
- District: Lejweleputswa
- Municipality: Masilonyana

Area
  - Total: 44.79 km^{2} (17.29 sq mi)

Population (2011)
  - Total: 186
  - Density: 4.15/km^{2} (10.8/sq mi)

Racial makeup (2011)
  - Black African: 29.7%
  - White: 70.3%

First languages (2011)
  - Afrikaans: 80.0%
  - Sotho: 8.1%
  - Tswana: 7.0%
  - English: 4.9%
- Time zone: UTC+2 (SAST)
- PO box: 9356
- Area code: 051

Soutpan is a town in Lejweleputswa District Municipality in the Free State province of South Africa.

Village 45 km west of Brandfort, just north of Florisbad. Afrikaans for ‘salt pan or depression’, the name is derived from a large geographical feature of that type, on the slopes of which the Florisbad archaeological site is situated.
