= Steynsrus =

Steynsrus Matlwangtlwang
- Location within Free State (South African province) Location within South Africa
- Coordinates: 27°57′S 27°34′E
- Country: South Africa
- Province: Free State
- District: Fezile Dabi
- Municipality: Moqhaka

Area
  - Total: 8.0 km^{2} (3.1 sq mi)

Population (2011)
  - Total: 9,106
  - Density: 1,100/km^{2} (2,900/sq mi)

Racial makeup (2011)
  - Black African: 94.3%
  - Coloured: 0.5%
  - Indian/Asian: 0.5%
  - White: 4.5%
  - Other: 0.1%

First languages (2011)
  - Sotho: 89.5%
  - Afrikaans: 5.5%
  - English: 1.7%
  - Sign language: 1.6%
  - Other: 1.7%
- Time zone: UTC+2 (SAST)
- Postal code (street): 9515
- PO box: 9515
- Area code: 056

Steynsrus, also called Matlwangtlwang is a small farming town in the Free State province of South Africa that was founded in 1910 and named after the last president of the Orange Free State, Martinus Theunis Steyn. It is included under Moqhaka Local Municipality, the tier of municipal government in South Africa, and administered from Kroonstad.

== History ==
The Bataung were the first people to settle here under Chief Moletsane, migrating from Lehurutshe, around the borders of Botswana and the present-day North West Province the mid-1700s.They formed a political and military alliance with Moshoeshoe I, who allowed them to settle here and named the area Matlwangtlwang. They were dispersed during the Free State Basotho Wars, and their land was allocated to the Boers by the Orange Free State government. While many remained scattered in the country and many fled to Lesotho.

== Location ==
Steynsrus is located on the R76 and R720 road between Kroonstad and Senekal, roughly 50 km from either; the distance, as with most towns in the Free State, that could be ridden in a day on horseback.

A fine sandstone Dutch Reformed Church, built in 1928, dominates the town and is its most notable architectural feature, sitting at the main axis, Van Reebeck and Haasbroek Streets.

== Economy ==
Apart from government services, agriculture is the main employer in this area, and many residents commute every day to work on the surrounding farms.

== Demographics ==
While in 2001 Steynsrus had a population of 1,192, Matlwangtlwang had a population of 6,441. Both Steynsrus and Matlwangtlwang had a majority of females in the population.

=== Ethnic groups ===
According to the 2001 census there were 847 white South Africans living in the town of Steynsrus (71.1%), almost all of Afrikaner background. The town also housed 18 (1.5%) shop owners who were South African citizens of Indian origin. Under apartheid Indians were banned from living in the Free State—even requiring a pass to travel through it—and those in Steynsrus are therefore relatively more recent residents. Steynsrus town also has a large (and growing) black minority, which in 2001 stood at 324 (27.2%). Of Matlwangtlwang's 6,441 inhabitants, 6,408 were classified as black in the 2001 census. 92.5% of them spoke Southern Sotho, with the next largest language being Zulu at 3.6%.

=== Language ===
Almost all the people in Matlwangtlwang speak seSotho. In the actual town of Steynsrus the majority (70.8%) of residents speak Afrikaans while most of the black minority speak Sesotho. A few whites, as well as most of the Asian population, say English is their mother tongue.
