= Setsoto Local Municipality =

Coordinates: 28°52′25″S 27°52′41″E

Setsoto
- Local municipality
- Seal

- Location in the Free State
- Country: South Africa
- Province: Free State
- District: Thabo Mofutsanyane
- Seat: Ficksburg
- Wards: 18

Government
  - Type: Municipal council
  - Mayor: Seipati Mbiwe

Area
  - Total: 5,966 km^{2} (2,303 sq mi)

Population (2022)
  - Total: 127,918
  - Density: 21.44/km^{2} (55.53/sq mi)

Racial makeup (2022)
  - Black African: 91.5%
  - Coloured: 0.9%
  - Indian/Asian: 1.2%
  - White: 6.3%

First languages (2011)
  - Sotho: 87.2%
  - Afrikaans: 7.1%
  - English: 2.9%
  - Sign language: 1.2%
  - Other: 1.6%
- Time zone: UTC+2 (SAST)
- Municipal code: FS191

Setsoto Municipality (Sotho: Masepala wa Setsoto) is a local municipality within the Thabo Mofutsanyane District Municipality, in the Free State province of South Africa. Setsoto is a Sesotho word meaning "beauty". The seat is Ficksburg. Other towns include Senekal, Clocolan and Marquard. The municipality is rich in agriculture and is known for producing cherries.

The first mayor was Ms M.Molete and the current is Ms Seipati Mbiwe.

== Main places ==
The 2011 census divided the municipality into the following main places:

Place	Code	Area (km^{2})	Population	Most spoken language
Clocolan		15.76	1,349	Afrikaans
Ficksburg		50.35	5,400	Afrikaans
Hlohlolwane		3.21	16,253	Sotho
Marquard		7.30	1,033	Afrikaans
Matwabeng		3.65	22,076	Sotho
Meqheleng		4.13	35,848	Sotho
Moemaneng		1.86	14,469	Sotho
Senekal		32.88	3,466	Afrikaans
Setsoto/Willem Pretorius Game Reserve		130.11	185	Sotho
Remainder of the municipality		5,712.13	12,519	Sotho

== Politics ==
The municipal council consists of thirty members elected by mixed-member proportional representation. Fifteen councillors are elected by first-past-the-post voting in fifteen wards, while the remaining fifteen are chosen from party lists so that the total number of party representatives is proportional to the number of votes received.

In the 2026 South African municipal elections the African National Congress (ANC) lost its majority, but remains the largest party, with thirteen seats.

The following table shows the results of the election.

Party	Ward			List			Total seats
Party	Votes	%	Seats	Votes	%	Seats	Total seats
African National Congress	12,615	44.16	12	12,855	44.97	1	13
Democratic Alliance	4,510	15.79	2	4,508	15.77	3	5
Economic Freedom Fighters	3,585	12.55	1	3,630	12.70	3	4
South African Communist Party	1,928	6.75	0	1,760	6.16	2	2
Setsoto Service Delivery Forum	1,828	6.40	0	1,762	6.16	2	2
Freedom Front Plus	1,579	5.53	0	1,638	5.73	2	2
ActionSA	569	1.99	0	586	2.05	1	1
African Congress for Transformation	461	1.61	0	461	1.61	1	1
Independent candidates	186	0.65	0				0
12 other parties	1,308	4.58	0	1,385	4.85	0	0
Total	28,569	100.00	15	28,585	100.00	15	30
Valid votes	28,569	97.69		28,585	97.87		
Invalid/blank votes	677	2.31		623	2.13		
Total votes	29,246	100.00		29,208	100.00		
Registered voters/turnout	60,134	48.63		60,134	48.57		
