= R711 (South Africa) =

Regional route in South Africa

Regional route R711

Route information
- Length: 35 km (22 mi)

Major junctions
- North end: R712 in Clarens
- South end: R26 in Fouriesburg

Location
- Country: South Africa

Highway system
- Numbered routes of South Africa
← R710	→ R712

The R711 is a Regional Route in Free State, South Africa that connects Clarens with Fouriesburg.

== Route ==
The R711's northern terminus is in Clarens, at a junction with the R712, which goes north to Bethlehem and east to the Golden Gate Highlands National Park. The R711 heads south from Clarens before turning west to end at an intersection with the R26 at Fouriesburg.

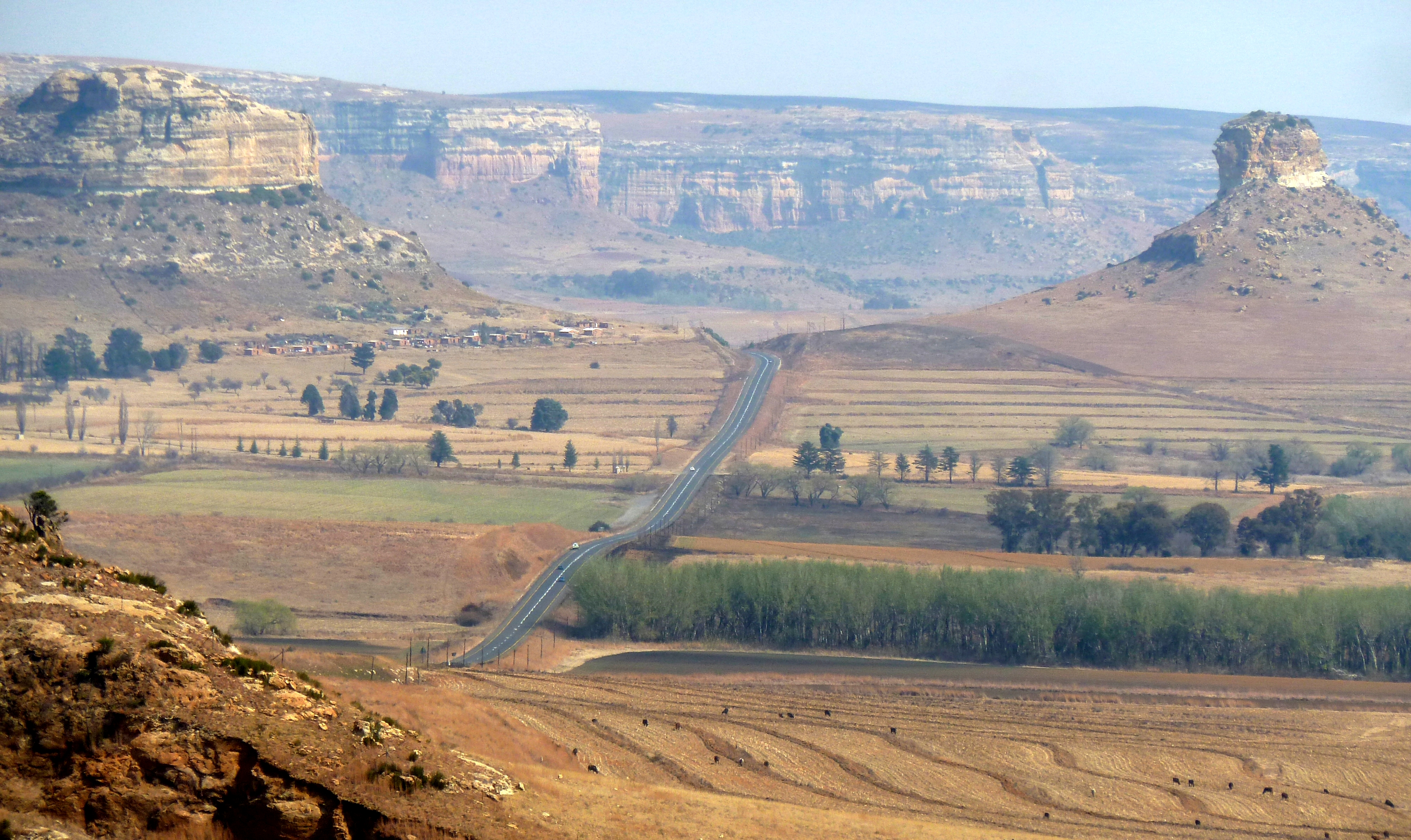
The R711 near Fouriesburg
