= Theunissen =

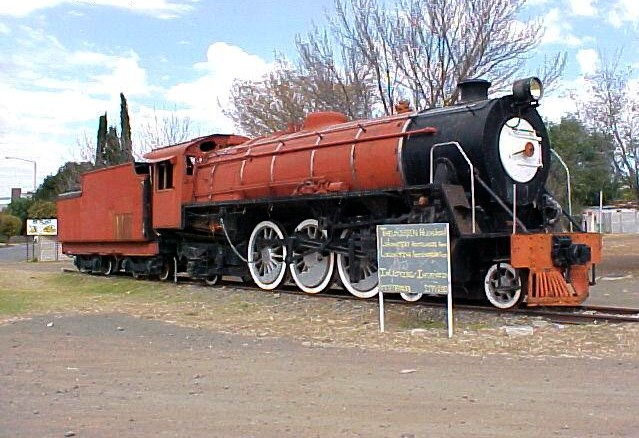
- SAR Class 16DA no. 850 plinthed in Theunissen; 29 May 2005

- Location within Free State (South African province) Location within South Africa
- Coordinates: 28°24′0″S 26°43′0″E
- Country: South Africa
- Province: Free State
- District: Lejweleputswa
- Municipality: Masilonyana
- Established: 13 September 1907

Area
  - Total: 9.2 km^{2} (3.6 sq mi)

Population (2011)
  - Total: 1,549
  - Density: 170/km^{2} (440/sq mi)

Racial makeup (2011)
  - Black African: 41.8%
  - Coloured: 1.6%
  - Indian/Asian: 0.9%
  - White: 54.3%
  - Other: 1.5%

First languages (2011)
  - Afrikaans: 54.8%
  - Sotho: 28.9%
  - English: 5.5%
  - Xhosa: 4.0%
  - Other: 6.8%
- Time zone: UTC+2 (SAST)
- Postal code (street): 9410
- PO box: 9410
- Area code: 057

Theunissen is a small town that has the only wine estate, the Theunissen Wine Farm, in the Free State province of South Africa. It is located about 95 kilometers northeast of Bloemfontein and about 45 kilometers south of Welkom on the R30 road. It was founded by Boer War Commandant Helgaardt Theunissen.

Theunissen has a small community (mostly farmers and miners) which supports the local businesses.

== Notable people ==
- Mothobi Mvala (born 1994) – South African football player.
- Pule Mmodi (born 1993)
