= Ficksburg =

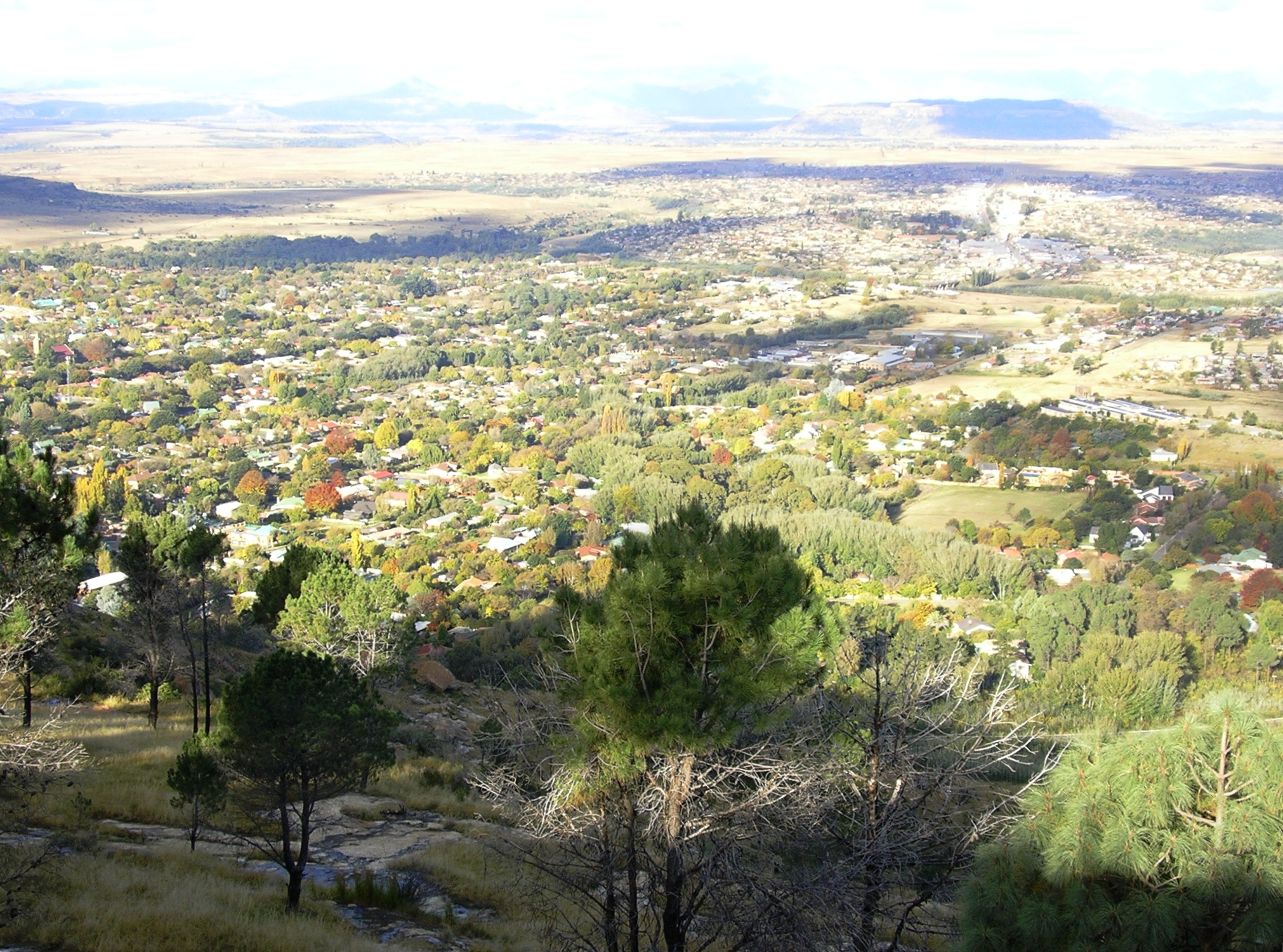
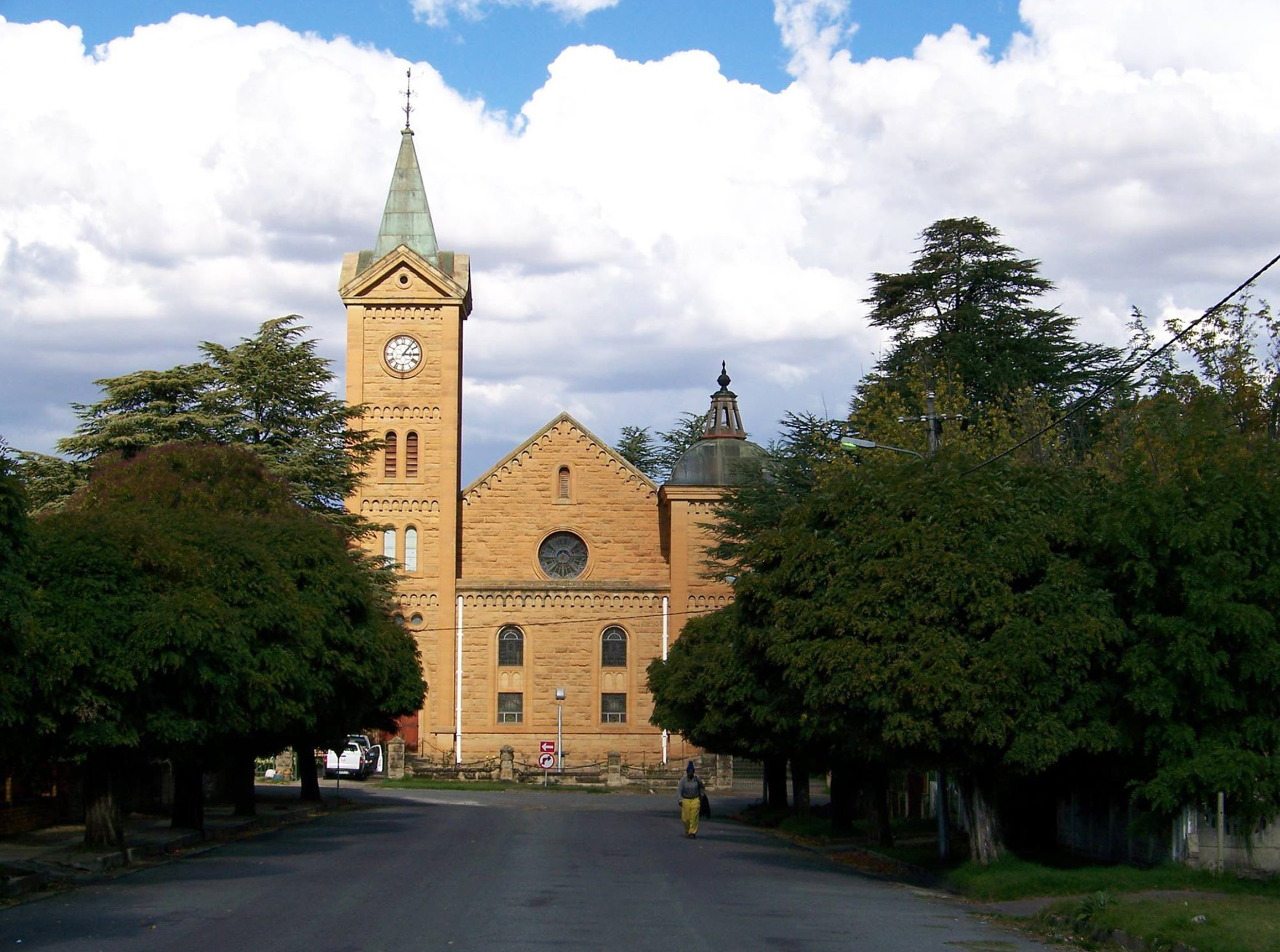
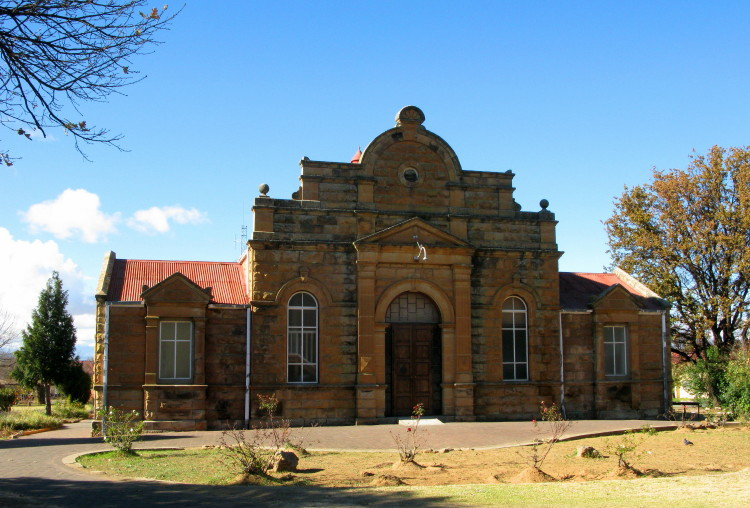
- Clockwise from top: View of Ficksburg from Imperani Mountain, Old Building, NG Church.

- Location within Free State (South African province) Location within South Africa Location within Africa
- Coordinates: 28°52′25.3″S 27°52′41.2″E
- Country: South Africa
- Province: Free State
- District: Thabo Mofutsanyane
- Municipality: Setsoto
- Established: 1867

Area
  - Total: 50.4 km^{2} (19.5 sq mi)
- Elevation: 1,628 m (5,341 ft)

Population (2011)
  - Total: 5,400
  - Density: 110/km^{2} (280/sq mi)

Racial makeup (2011)
  - Black African: 37.2%
  - Coloured: 7.0%
  - Indian/Asian: 12.0%
  - White: 42.3%
  - Other: 1.5%

First languages (2011)
  - Afrikaans: 50.9%
  - English: 22.4%
  - Sotho: 17.9%
  - Other: 8.8%
- Time zone: UTC+2 (SAST)
- Postal code (street): 9730
- PO box: 9730
- Area code: 051

Ficksburg is a town situated at the foot of the 1,750 meter high Imperani Mountain in Free State province, South Africa. The town was named after General Johan Fick in 1867 who won the territory in the Basotho Wars. He laid out many erven and plots that could be bought at a reasonable price. It is located on the north bank of the Mohokare River, which separates it from the town of Maputsoe in Lesotho. The town was later proclaimed a municipality in 1891.

== Profile ==
Ficksburg, after Bethlehem (the chief administrative town) is the second busiest and important town in the Eastern Free State region of the Free State province. Ficksburg is the seat of the Setsoto Local Municipality which includes the towns of Clocolan, Marquard and Senekal. The total population of the entire area is 125,751.

It is an important agricultural region where crops like maize and asparagus are grown. The most important part of the annual crop of Ficksburg is the harvesting of the cherries on the numerous cherry farms surrounding the town. The cherries are harvested from October to December. Annually in November the Cherry Festival is held. The festival stretches over 3 days and attracts up to 30,000 people. The festival presents family shows and activities like the herding of sheep, horse rides, camel rides, helicopter flips, steam train rides at Sandstone Estate, tours through town to see the sandstone building architecture which Ficksburg is well known for. There are also tours of the surrounding countryside, tours to the cherry and asparagus farms where people are shown everything about the industry, and airplane trips to the Katse Dam in Lesotho.

The town also has a wide variety of guesthouses and B&Bs and an exclusive 3-star hotel serves as accommodation for tourists visiting the town. There are restaurants as well.

Ficksburg is known as "The Gateway to the Mountain Kingdom Of Lesotho". Lesotho is an enclaved country in the central part of South Africa. From Ficksburg, visitors can travel to the Katse Dam in Lesotho. This dam provides water to the industrial and commercial hub of Gauteng Province. The dam is in a scenic area and is situated 3,000 m (9,842 ft) high up in the Maluti Mountains of Lesotho. The dam is used for boating and fishing and is visited by tourists every year who gain access to Lesotho through Ficksburg.

The region is also known as the asparagus region of South Africa, where hundreds of tons of asparagus are harvested from September. Other kinds of fruit like peaches, apricots, cherries and apples are also grown in the region. Livestock is also an important industry in the region. There are numerous dairy farms in the countryside.

A notable event in the town's history was the shooting of Andries Tatane by the South African Police Service in April 2011.

== Population ==
According to the 2011 Census conducted by the Department of Statistics South Africa (Stats SA), Ficksburg had a total population of 5400 residents, of whom 50.9% reported Afrikaans as their primary home language, 22.4% reported English as their primary home language and 17.9% reported Sesotho as their primary home language. The population density was 107 persons per km^{2}.

The township of Meqheleng adjoins the town of Ficksburg. According to the 2011 Census conducted by the Department of Statistics South Africa (Stats SA), Meqheleng had a total population of 35,848 residents, of whom 94.6% reported Sesotho as their primary home language. The population density was 4579 persons per km^{2}.

== Notable residents ==
- Roelf Meyer, politician. Schooled and matriculated in 1964 in Ficksburg
- Andries Tatane, murder victim
- Guy Tunmer, one-time Formula One driver
- Marie Warder, author
- C. R. Swart, first president of South Africa

After completing his early studies, Charles Robberts Swart worked as a teacher at the high school in Ficksburg from 1914 until the end of 1915. During the period of the 1914 Rebellion, Swart was arrested on 11 November 1914 after he had taken a photograph of the town guard. He was brought before a military council on a charge of espionage and detained in a cell. After several days of solitary confinement, during which local schoolchildren reportedly brought food and books for him, he was again questioned by the military authorities. He was eventually allowed to resume his teaching duties under house arrest, as the matriculation and school-leaving examinations were approaching. Outside school hours he was permitted to leave his residence only with a special pass. The prison cell where he had been held was later declared a national monument. Swart later became the last Governor-General of the Union of South Africa and the first State President of South Africa.

== Media ==
The Ficksburg News began publication as a community newspaper in the early 1900s and, after a hiatus in the 1970s, resumed in its present form in 1979. The town also has a community radio station that broadcasts to the surrounding towns of Fouriesburg, Clocolan and Ladybrand. Sesoto FM broadcast 24 hours per day in Sesotho.

In the 1930s and throughout the "war years" the editor of the Ficksburg News was Harold Lloyd, whose son, Michael, also a journalist, became well known as the editor of The Star, The Natal Mercury and the Diamond Fields Advertiser, among other leading newspapers. After suffering many tribulations as a prisoner-of-war, he became an Anglican priest and, at the time of his death, was the rector of St. Alban's Church in Kimberley. Both Lloyds were responsible for kindling in the well-known writer, Marie Warder, the desire to become a journalist.

A rarity for French tourists visiting Ficksburg is that it has a repeater for Radio France International (RFI) in the case of Ficksburg, because of the multitude of French missionaries in the neighboring country of Lesotho. Radiomonde Français International broadcasts 24 hours per day in French and English on 96.5 FM Stereo exclusively to Ficksburg. The BBC World Service radio station broadcasts from London 24 hours per day on 90.2 FM Stereo.

== Coats of arms ==
=== Municipal (1) ===
By 1931, the Ficksburg municipal council had assumed a pseudo-heraldic coat of arms. The shield was divided in two, the upper half depicting the Roman goddess Ceres holding a torch above her head, in a landscape setting, and the lower half depicting a maize cob and three ears of wheat on a blue background. The motto was Virtus in arduis.

=== Municipal (2) ===
The council registered a new, and heraldically better, design with the Orange Free State Provincial Administration in June 1967 and at the Bureau of Heraldry in September 1969.

The new arms were: Per chevron Gules and Or, in chief two garbs Or and in base a cross humette Vert; on a chief Or two sprigs of cherry fructed proper. In layman's terms, the shield displayed a golden chevron (bearing two sprigs of cherry) between two golden wheatsheaves on a red background (above) and a green cross on a gold background (below).

The crest was an arm holding a torch, issuing from a golden mural crown. The motto remained Virtus in arduis.

== Ficksburg Cherry Festival ==
Ficksburg is known in South Africa as the Cherry Town and the Cherry Capital of the world. The festival is arguably the oldest crop festival in South Africa. The Ficksburg Cherry Festival happens during the third week of November annually. It takes place in November every year. The festival has been held for over 45 consecutive years and the festival continues to grow each year. The festival attracts almosta 30,000 visitors each year and plays an integral role in tourism as it creates employment and is the small town's largest marketing tool. The event has benefited the town in profits of over R15 million annually through food, accommodation, shopping, and entertainment. The early traditional events of the festival included a street parade, a festive Cherry Ball and the crowning of the Cherry Queen, however, events have changed over time.

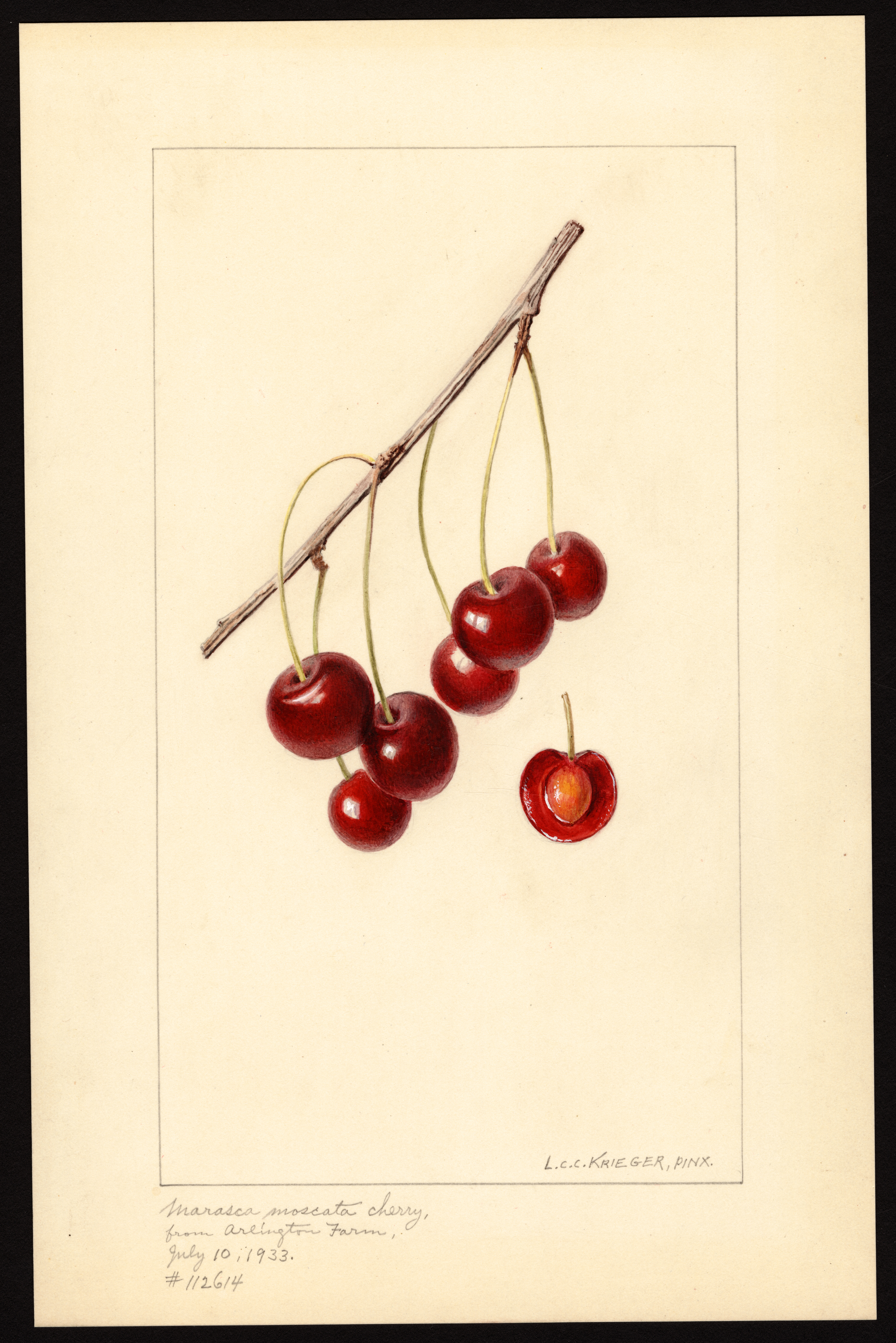
Watercolor of Marasca Moscata variety of cherry (Prunus avium)

== History of cherry farming in the area ==
Harry Pickston contacted German missionaries in South Africa enquiring about growing cherries in the country for the first time. In the year 1905, a year after Harry Pickston had enquired about cherries, the first cherry trees were planted in South Africa on the farm 'Platkop' in the Clocolan district. The variants of the planted cherries included Giant Heidelfinger, Elton, Early Red, Early River, and Bing. This specific cluster of cherries is still grown in the area today. Some of the original cherry trees that were planted in 1905 can still be found on the farm. It is estimated that there are over 500 hectares of cherry trees in the Eastern Free State mainly in the Ficksburg, Clocolan and Fouriesburg area.

There are approximately 250 cherry trees per hectare which average a yield of 10 tons per hectare. The maraschino cherry, a sweet cherry, originated in Yugoslavia and northern Italy where traders added a liqueur to a cherry called the “Marasca.”

The first Ficksburg Cherry Festival happened in 1968 and was started by the local Jaycees.

== Entertainment ==
The festival offers a variety of events that cater for different age groups. These events include children's entertainment, wine & chocolate pairing, stalls, various competitions, sporting activities like golf & soccer, workshops, exhibitions, product sales and all things associated with cherries. Popular local performers, that has performed at the festival include Jaunita du Plessis, Ezulka van Zyl, Glaskas, Romanz, Marimba Band, Refentse, The Soweto String Quartet and the Lipizzaner horses from Johannesburg. However, performers are announced annually. The Festival also offers special tours of the surrounding cherry and asparagus farms where visitors can see the harvesting and production process of cherries in the community. Visitors can also participate in cherry picking on local farms. A festival favorite includes the 'cherry mampoer' (South African 'Moonshine') competition. There are also events and activities surrounding the Ficksburg Cherry Festival that can be attended during November including the White Mischief Cruise which sails around the Meulspruit dam on the "White Mischief " with seating for 22 people. There are also heritage steam train rides, and heritage tractors to see, at Sandstone Estates 14 kilometers away. Visitors can also see game in the Thaba Imperani Nature Reserve 8 km from Ficksburg on the Hammonia road. The game reserve borders the Meulspruit Dam.
