= Clocolan =

- Hlohlolwane
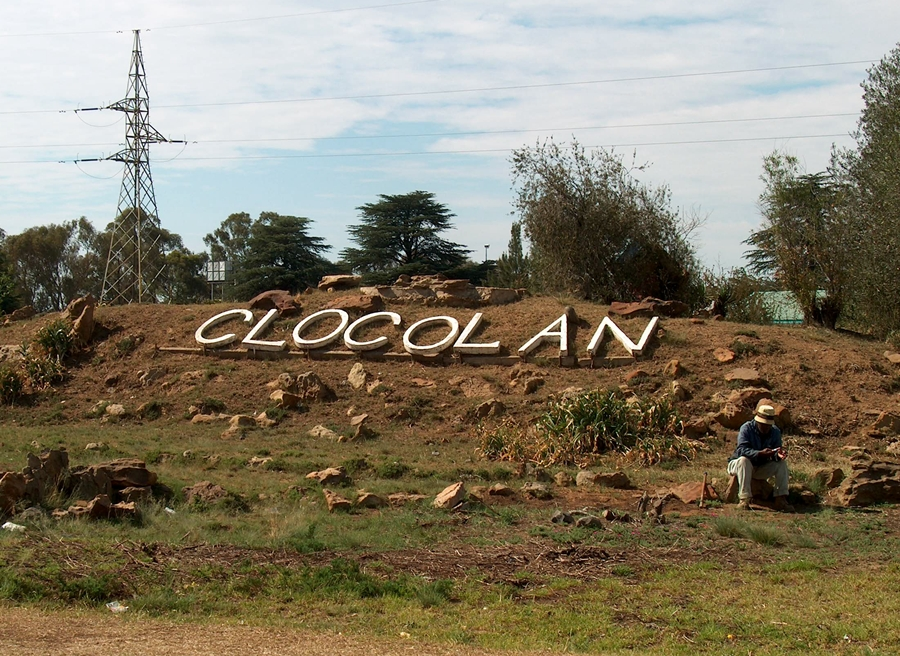

- Location within Free State (South African province) Location within South Africa Location within Africa
- Coordinates: 28°54′50″S 27°34′01″E
- Country: South Africa
- Province: Free State
- District: Thabo Mofutsanyane
- Municipality: Setsoto
- Established: 1906

Area
  - Total: 15.8 km^{2} (6.1 sq mi)

Population (2011)
  - Total: 1,349
  - Density: 85.4/km^{2} (221/sq mi)

Racial makeup (2011)
  - Black African: 48.9%
  - Coloured: 1.3%
  - Indian/Asian: 3.1%
  - White: 46.2%
  - Other: 0.5%

First languages (2011)
  - Afrikaans: 47.1%
  - Sotho: 35.5%
  - English: 13.7%
  - Sign language: 1.7%
  - Other: 2.0%
- Time zone: UTC+2 (SAST)
- Postal code (street): 9735
- PO box: 9735
- Area code: 051

Clocolan, officially renamed Hlohlolwane, was established in 1906, is a small town in the Free State Province of South Africa. The Basotho called the place Hlohlolwane (Hlohla-o-lwane, "get up and fight"). New inhabitants mispronounced the name and called it Clocolan.

== History ==
The first to inhabit the area were the ancient Kwena people from Botswana. Soon the Basotho followed. The Bakwena, a Sotho tribe, gave Hlohloloane its name in 1800. The Bakwena Chief Motebang lived in the Northern part of Clocolan, in an area known as ‘Betang’, today a private farm. Motebang invited the neighbouring Baphuthi Zulu clan to assist his people stacking corn baskets after a successful harvest. An argument erupted when one Bakwena elder charged at the Baphuti's. The argument brought forth the slogan ‘Hlohla-o-loane’ or ‘Hlohloloane’, that translates as “Get/stand up and fight” and this may explain how the town earned its name. Boer Settlers, displaced by British administrative policies in the Cape in the early 1800s drove the Basotho out of the area. As the Boers engaged in settled agriculture the formal town of Clocolan was built as a consequence of the social and economic systems coming to the area. By the late 1800s increasing western civilization was making its mark and trading posts, schools and churches were built with a railway line laid to the town in 1907.

== Geography ==
The town is in the Thabo Mofutsanyana region of the Free State Province in South Africa. It is located along the Maloti route main road, 20 kilometers from the Caledon river, alongside the Lesotho border. Due to its location, the town trades with Lesotho, Southern parts of the Free State, Kwa-Zulu Natal and the Cape.

== Location ==
Clocolan is situated along the R26 about 34 km from Ficksburg to the northeast and just under 70 km from Maseru to the south over the Lesotho border. The name is derived from the Hlohlolwane mountain which stands 1 820 km above sea level. Hlohlolwane means “stand-up-and-fight” which refers to an altercation between the Koena tribe and Baphuthing over a maize harvest. The town was established in 1906 on the farms of Reinzi and Herold. The town grew out of the need for schools, churches and business services for the surrounding farming community. It obtained municipal status on 18 July 1910. The eastern Free State cherry industry originated in the Clocolan district where the first trees were planted by Henry Pickstone in 1904 on the farm Platkop. Besides cherry orchards, farming in the area predominantly consists of asparagus, wheat, maize, potatoes and cattle. Clocolan has one industrial area, situated in the eastern side of the town close to the railway line.

== Farming ==
The area is known for the cultivation of wheat, maize, cherries, large cattle and sheep herds.

== Tourism ==
Tourists can visit the following places:

- Deemsters Asparagus Factory to learn about the history of this local crop
- Nebo and Die Hoek where visitors can view San rock art paintings
- Tandjiesberg rock shelter has rock paintings and was declared a National Monument on 30 October 1992. It was one of 12 rock art National Monuments in South Africa at the time and is now a Provincial Heritage Site. The rock art painting includes one of an elephant with a small human figure on its trunk. There are also paintings of animals associated with rainmaking and images of a medicine dance. Archaeological excavations established that Bushmen lived here for at least 1 000 years. It is believed that the mountain above the rock shelter was a place of spiritual significance.
- Lethoteng Weavers – a community project involving the weaving of articles by local craftswomen including jerseys, scarves, carpets and other items from Angora Rabbit, Mohair and wool.

=== Vintage Tractor and Engine Fair ===
The Vintage Tractor and Engine Fair is an annual fair that has taken place in Clocolan since 1989. The fair started with only 29 tractors and has grown in recent years to 153. Tractors are paraded through the small farming community. Some of its attractions are a 1902 threshold machine, the Annual National Ploughing Championships and a hand plowing with magnificent Nguni bulls.

== In popular culture ==
The name is used by recording artist Clocolan—South African-born composer Emlyn Ellis Addison.

== See also ==
- Askham
- Ficksburg
- Senekal
- Rosendal, South Africa
