= Florisbad archaeological and paleontological site =

Archaeological site in South Africa

Coordinates: 28°46′S 26°04′E

The Florisbad archaeological and paleontological site is a provincial heritage site in Soutpan in the Free State province of South Africa. The most notable find at this site is the Florisbad Skull, the partial skull of an early human species that was discovered in 1932.

In 1997 it was described in the Government Gazette as:

The Florisbad fossil site consists of a sequence of Quaternary deposits associated with a thermal spring, situated 45 km NNW of Bloemfontein in central South Africa (28°46’S, 26°04’E). There are two kinds of fossil context at Florisbad: naturally accumulated vertebrate fossil material from spring sedimentary contexts, which includes the human skull fragment, and archaeological remains from old land surfaces. The material from spring contexts represents mainly the remains of ancient carnivore hunting and scavenging around palaeo-waterholes associated with the spring. Spring sediments intrude into the horizontal or sub-horizontal deposits, which, in some cases, represent stable land surfaces. These land surfaces are, to a greater or lesser degree, disturbed by post-depositional spring action and saturation during times of a higher water table...The Florisbad fossil locality is internationally known for producing a pre-modern human skull, Middle Pleistocene fossil vertebrates and Middle Stone Age artefacts...

The stratigraphic nature of the site is characterized by distinct sand and peat layers, with the latter allowing for increased preservation of organic materials. The artifact-rich mound contains deposits ranging from the late Middle Pleistocene through to the early Holocene. Excavations at this site go back to the early twentieth century, and a variety of artifact assemblages have been recovered from the site, including faunal remains and lithics.

== Archaeology ==
=== Faunal remains ===
The most widely known faunal assemblages from the Florisbad spring site comprise what is known as the Florisian Land Mammal Age. These fossils are considered a type assemblage, and as such help define the Middle Stone Age fauna of southern Africa. The faunal materials that make up the Florisian Land Mammal Age have been shown to lack human alteration; many of these bones show evidence of natural death, carnivorous scavenging, and long-term exposure to the elements on the land surface. This is consistent with a faunal assemblage that accumulated naturally, as opposed to being deposited by human hunting, butchery, or scavenging activities.

In contrast to the Florisian Land Mammal Age type assemblage, there are faunal remains from the Florisbad site that can linked to human occupation in a later phase of the Middle Stone Age. These fossils show no distinct marks indicative of carnivorous scavenging, but they do show evidence of intentional fragmentation consistent with human strategies for bone marrow extraction.

=== Lithics ===
Lithic artifacts were found throughout the vertical excavation layers of the Florisbad spring site, and they generally fall into one of four sequential groups: the "Macrolithic" industry, the Florisbad Industry, the Middle Stone Age industry, and the Late Stone Age Lockshoek Industry.

Recovered from the base of the site, the assemblage of artifacts termed "Macrolithics" can be attributed to either the later Early Stone Age or the early Middle Stone Age, with a lack of diagnostic artifacts complicating this categorization. These artifacts include retouched scrapers, unretouched flakes, and a core.

The Florisbad Industry assemblage is composed largely of Middle Stone Age lithics that are highly retouched, which is what differentiates them from the more general, unretouched Middle Stone Age lithics at the site. This assemblage category includes cores, retouched flakes, and a retouched, bifacial blade, and it has been used for comparison with other nearby sites.

The Middle Stone Age industry assemblage is mostly composed of robust cores and thick flakes without rounded edges. Most of these artifacts are unretouched and were associated in situ with faunal remains that bear evidence of human alteration. This association between the large Middle Stone Age artifact assemblage and the Middle Stone Age human occupation at Florisbad has led researchers to conclude that these lithics may be the products of artifact manufacture and comprise a specialized industry used for animal butchering.

The Late Stone Age Lockshoek Industry is characterized by large diagnostic convex scrapers, and the assemblage at Florisbad is made mostly of hornfels. Comparative analysis to dated assemblages places the Lockshoek Industry artifacts in the early Holocene.

=== Human occupation ===
Evidence of multiple, short-term human occupations during the Middle Stone Age are present at the site. In addition to the Middle Stone Age lithics industry assemblage, the same deposit contained a hearth, charcoal fragments, burnt animal bone fragments, and faunal remains with evidence of human alteration and butchery. Together, these lines of evidence point to a specialized butchery and tool-making activities over repeated short periods of time.

=== Other artifact types ===
Analysis has also been done on wooden fragments recovered from layers of peat at the site. One wooden artifact was found to have intentional cut marks on its surface, but its functional use has not been determined. This fragment has been classified as a Middle Stone Age artifact, and the wood from which it is made has been identified as the kundanyoka knobwood (Zanthoxylum chalybeum). This wood is not native to South Africa, where the artifact was recovered, but does occur naturally in parts of Zimbabwe.
