= Excelsior, South Africa =

Excelsior
- Location within Free State (South African province) Location within South Africa
- Coordinates: 28°56′23″S 27°3′37″E
- Country: South Africa
- Province: Free State
- District: Thabo Mofutsanyane
- Municipality: Mantsopa

Area
  - Total: 11.3 km^{2} (4.4 sq mi)

Population (2011)
  - Total: 748
  - Density: 66.2/km^{2} (171/sq mi)

Racial makeup (2011)
  - Black African: 58.2%
  - Coloured: 1.1%
  - Indian/Asian: 1.9%
  - White: 37.5%
  - Other: 1.3%

First languages (2011)
  - Afrikaans: 57.4%
  - Sotho: 31.8%
  - English: 1.7%
  - Other: 9.1%
- Time zone: UTC+2 (SAST)
- Postal code (street): 9760
- PO box: 9760
- Area code: 051

Excelsior is a small farming town in the Free State province of South Africa. It was formed by farmers in 1910 who wanted a town which was closer to them than Winburg and Ladybrand.

The farmers had to decide on which farm the town will be established. The two farms were Sunshine and Excelsior (Latin), which, translated to English means "Higher Up", or in Afrikaans "Hoër Op". The farm Excelsior was chosen due to its higher location. The first church was erected in the vicinity of where the Farmers Co-op is situated today.

The secondary asphalt roads were built in 1980 to 1984, and this helped in not travelling on the gravel roads to Bloemfontein via Verkeerdevlei. Many accidents and deaths on the roads close to town occurred before the roads were upgraded.

Water to the town is supplied via boreholes, filled with good levels of fluoride and stored in sandstone reservoirs up at the "neck" on the road to Winburg. Today, a weather station is based in this small town, and very accurate readings help farmers plan for agricultural purposes.

== Apartheid controversies ==
Excelsior was a newsworthy town in the late 1960s and early 1970s for 19 people contravening the Immorality Act under apartheid legislation (also known as the Excelsior 19). In 1971, 19 White men and Black women were charged with contravening the immorality act. Their charges were brought to light after the births of several mixed-race children in the Black township of Mahlatswetsa. The police forcibly brought in a doctor from Bloemfontein to conduct blood tests on the suspected parents, some of whom were prominent and respected members of the National Party. Under pressure, one of the accused white men, a local butcher named Johannes Calitz, committed suicide.

=== The Madonna of Excelsior ===
A better understanding on what happened between white males and black females can be read in the book The Madonna of Excelsior by South African-born author, Zakes Mda.
