= Brandfort =

- Winnie Mandela
- Location within Free State (South African province) Location within South Africa
- Coordinates: 28°42′5″S 26°27′32″E
- Country: South Africa
- Province: Free State
- District: Lejweleputswa
- Municipality: Masilonyana
- Established: 1875

Area
  - Total: 27.1 km^{2} (10.5 sq mi)

Population (2011)
  - Total: 3,143
  - Density: 116/km^{2} (300/sq mi)

Racial makeup (2011)
  - Black African: 52.3%
  - Coloured: 1.9%
  - Indian/Asian: 0.7%
  - White: 45.1%
  - Other: 0.0%

First languages (2011)
  - Afrikaans: 49.1%
  - Sotho: 33.4%
  - Xhosa: 6.7%
  - Tswana: 4.1%
  - Other: 6.7%
- Time zone: UTC+2 (SAST)
- Postal code (street): 9400
- PO box: 9400
- Area code: 051
- Website: Official website

Brandfort, officially renamed Winnie Mandela in 2021, is a small agricultural town in the central Free State province of South Africa, about 60 km northeast of Bloemfontein on the R30 road. The town serves the surrounding farms for supplies and amenities. It is well known for once being home to the anti-apartheid stalwart and wife of Nelson Mandela, Winnie Mandela, during her banishment.

== History ==
Brandfort developed on a farm called "Keerom", which means "to turn around" in Afrikaans. A Voortrekker elder and early landholder in the area named Jacobus van Zijl(van Zyl), portioned and sold land on which developed into the town that still exists to this day. The Dutch Reformed Church was founded on "Keerom" in 1866. The town served as an important link between Bloemfontein and western regions of the Orange Free State, sustained by an agricultural environment. After the town was proclaimed and registered in 1874, the community was visited by the then Orange Free State President, Johannes Brand, and the settlement was named in his honour shortly afterwards. By the late 19th century, the town had established institutions, such as schools, a magistrate's court, and basic municipal infrastructure.

=== Anglo-Boer War and concentration camps (1899-1902) ===
During the Second Anglo-Boer War, the British authorities built a concentration camp in and around Brandfort to house Boer civilians, mostly women and children, as well as a separate camp for Blacks. Conditions in the camp were characterized by overcrowding, poor hygiene, starvation, disease, and high mortality rates, reflecting the cruel circumstances imposed by the British throughout camps in the Orange Free State.

A historical connection emerged from this period of war when the brother of the famous Dutch painter, Vincent van Gogh, picked up arms to join the Boer army as a volunteer. Cornelis 'Cor' van Gogh emigrated to South Africa in 1899 at the age of 22. He suffered an untimely death on the 14th of April 1900 in a military hospital. He was subsequently buried in an unmarked grave in an unknown location near Brandfort.

=== Early 20th century: aviation and innovation ===
In the early 20th century, Brandfort became associated with technological innovation through the work of Rear Admiral John Wesson, whose house is now a local museum. R. Adm. Wesson constructed and tested one of the first aircraft and motorised caravans on the continent, making him a pioneer of his time and ingraining innovative history into the town.

=== Political figures and national prominence ===
Brandfort has historical associations with several South African political figures, including former prime minister Hendrik Frensch Verwoerd (1901-1966), an architect of apartheid, who lived and matriculated here.

The very first State President of the Republic of South Africa, Charles Robberts Swart (C.R. Swart) (1894-1982), had personal and familial ties to Brandfort, including the nearby farm, "De Aap", that he owned during his presidency from 1961 to 1967. The local high school is named after him.

Winnie Madikizela-Mandela (1936-2018), former wife of President Nelson Mandela, was banished to Brandfort in 1977 under strict banning laws under the apartheid government. Her famous Banishment House is now a heritage site.

== Main sites ==
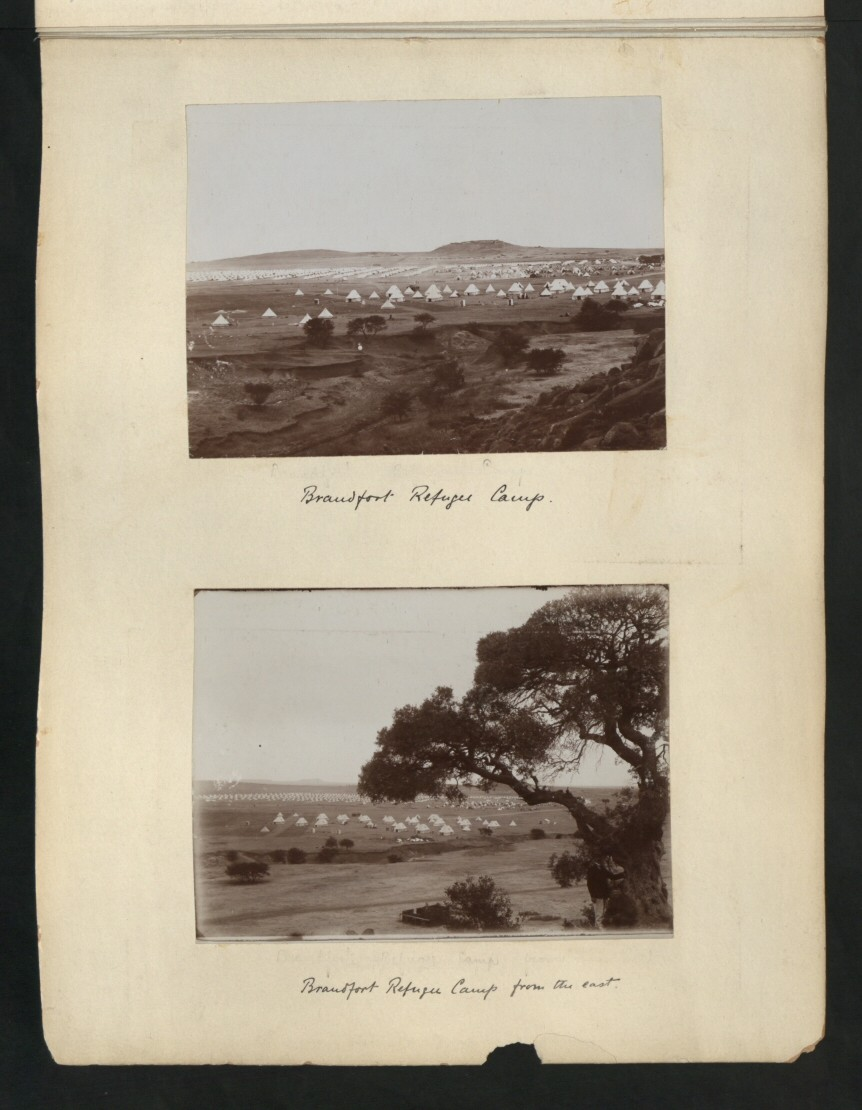
Brandfort concentration camp

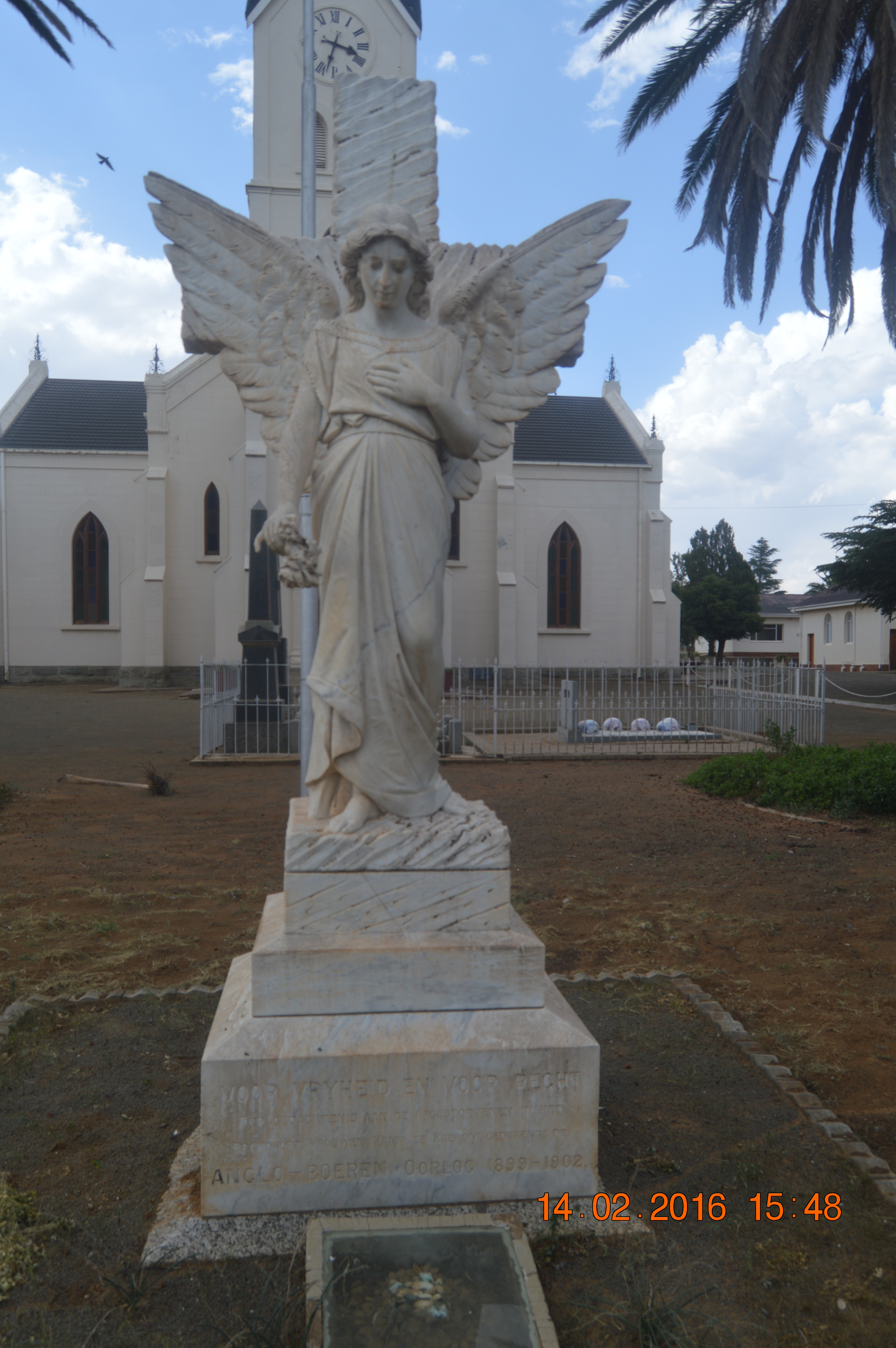
Angel statue in front of Dutch Reformed Church in Brandfort

=== Concentration camps ===
Concentration camps, derived from the Spanish word "concentrade", were first used in Cuba in 1896 by General Butcher Weyler. Half a million Cuban civilians were rounded up and incarcerated in fortified villages in which about 100 000 died. In South Africa, the first concentration camps were erected in early 1901 during the Anglo-Boer South African War (1899-1902), also known as the Second Boer War. Thousands of women and children were removed from their farms and towns to the concentration camps.

Conditions in the concentration camps were poor due to overcrowding and inadequate supplies. Malnutrition and disease spread rapidly leading to the deaths of many civilians in these camps.

Segregation persisted during wartime and there was a camp for whites called Dwyersdorp (named after Captain Dwyer who assisted white women and children who had been incarcerated at the camp) and the adjacent one for blacks was called Nooitgedacht.

The camp cemetery was declared a National Monument in 1985 and currently holds Provincial Heritage Site status. It contains the remains of 1263 women and children. The cemetery was opened on 22 September 1962 by President Charles Robberts Swart.

=== Banishment house of Winnie Mandela ===
Winnie Mandela (politician, convict liberation struggle stalwart and former wife of the late Nelson Mandela) was banished to Brandfort in May 1977. She lived at house number 802 in the black township in Brandfort. The area had no running water and electricity and, when she moved to the house, there were no floors and ceilings.

In the book, Winnie Mandela: A life, she described Brandfort as:

"A drab and dusty rural hamlet with unimaginative houses, an old-fashioned two-storey hotel, small shops lining the main street and a pervading atmosphere of lethargy and inactivity… The forlorn township had no official name but the black residents had baptised it “Phathakahle” meaning handle with care"

The site has been nominated as a National Heritage Site was converted into a museum in 2022. The handover ceremony for the museum took place on 8 December 2022.

=== Other sites ===
Other monuments and heritage sites

==== Florisbad archaeological and palaeontological site ====
The Florisbad archaeological and paleontological site lies about 46 km west of Brandfort and the site was declared a National Monument (now a Provincial Heritage Site) in 1997. The Florisbad Skull, an early hominid from the Middle Stone Age, was found here.

==== Rear-Admiral John Weston's House MUSEUM. Declared by then President C.R.Swart in the 1960s as a National Monument ====
The first aeroplane built in Africa was built in Brandfort on property owned by Rear-Admiral John Weston. The house has been turned into a restaurant and tourist attraction setting out the history of the Rear-Admiral and Brandfort. It has been nominated a National Heritage Site by SAHRA. This is where John Weston lived and designed both the aeroplane and Gnome engine now exhibited by the Bloemfontein Museum. The engine is a Provincial Heritage object of memory. He also designed the first RV/motorised caravan in the world. He travelled through Africa with his family for 18 months from Cape Agulhas to Palestine. Their journey was interrupted because the children had to attend school in England. He married Lily Roux in 1906. They had 3 children: Anna, Kathleen and Max. Weston lived an extraordinary life which came to an abrupt end in 1950 when he was murdered in Bergville.

==== Voortrekker Memorial Wall ====
In front of the Dutch Reformed Church, there is a wall of names which honours Voortrekker settlers in the area.

==== Angel statue ====
This statue stands prominently in front of the Dutch Reformed Church. It commemorates the Boer women and children (and also farm workers) who died in the Brandfort concentration camps during the South African War.
