= Marquard =

Marquard Moemaneng
- Location within Free State (South African province) Location within South Africa
- Coordinates: 28°40′S 27°26′E
- Country: South Africa
- Province: Free State
- District: Thabo Mofutsanyane
- Municipality: Setsoto

Area
  - Total: 7.3 km^{2} (2.8 sq mi)

Population (2011)
  - Total: 1,033
  - Density: 140/km^{2} (370/sq mi)

Racial makeup (2016)
  - Black African: 42.5%
  - Coloured: 1.2%
  - Indian/Asian: 5.7%
  - White: 47.7%
  - Other: 2.9%

First languages (2016)
  - Afrikaans: 53.4%
  - Sotho: 29.2%
  - English: 11.1%
  - Other: 6.3%
- Time zone: UTC+2 (SAST)
- Postal code (street): 9610
- PO box: 9610
- Area code: 051
- Website: http://www.marquard.co.za/

Marquard is a small farming town in the Free State province of South Africa that serves Winburg in the northwest. The town was set up in 1905 by an influential Dutch Reform minister, JJ Marquard, with the help of Christoffel Cornelis Froneman, the commandant of the Orange Free State. It was established on the farm Varschfontein and attained municipal status in the same year.

Marquard is 169 kilometers east north-east of Bloemfontein and 45 kilometers south-west of Senekal. The town was named after J J T Marquard, minister of the Dutch Reformed Church in Winburg, who had pleaded for the establishment of the town.
