= Masilonyana Local Municipality =

Masilonyana
- Local municipality
- Seal

- Location in the Free State
- Coordinates: 28.5167°S 27.0167°E
- Country: South Africa
- Province: Free State
- District: Lejweleputswa
- Seat: Theunissen
- Wards: 10

Government
  - Type: Municipal council
  - Mayor: Kunatu Steve Koalane

Area
  - Total: 6,796 km^{2} (2,624 sq mi)

Population (2022)
  - Total: 63,800
  - Density: 9.39/km^{2} (24.3/sq mi)

Racial makeup (2022)
  - Black African: 89.3%
  - Coloured: 0.8%
  - Indian/Asian: 0.3%
  - White: 9.5%

First languages (2011)
  - Sotho: 66.9%
  - Xhosa: 10.8%
  - Afrikaans: 9.6%
  - Tswana: 6.9%
  - Other: 5.8%
- Time zone: UTC+2 (SAST)
- Municipal code: FS181

Masilonyana Municipality (Sotho: Masepala wa Masilonyana; Xhosa: uMasipala wase Masilonyana) is a local municipality within the Lejweleputswa District Municipality, in the Free State province of South Africa. Masilonyana is a Setswana word meaning "freedom".

== Main places ==
The 2011 census divided the municipality into the following main places:

Place	Code	Area (km^{2})	Population	Most spoken language
Brandfort		27.08	3,134	Afrikaans
Ikgomotseng		1.14	3,253	Tswana
Majemasweu		2.79	9,765	Sotho
Makeleketla		3.69	12,701	Sotho
Masilo		4.70	21,963	Sotho
Theunissen		9.15	1,549	Afrikaans
Tshepong		0.61	2,042	Sotho
Verkeerdevlei		7.27	93	Afrikaans
Winburg		63.46	1,373	Afrikaans
Remainder of the municipality		6,676.18	7,461	Sotho

== Politics ==
The municipal council consists of nineteen members elected by mixed-member proportional representation. Ten councillors are elected by first-past-the-post voting in ten wards, while the remaining nine are chosen from party lists so that the total number of party representatives is proportional to the number of votes received.

In the 2026 South African municipal elections the African National Congress (ANC) lost its majority, but remains the largest party.

The following table shows the results of the 2026 election.

Party	Ward			List			Total seats
Party	Votes	%	Seats	Votes	%	Seats	Total seats
African National Congress	6,176	37.40	6	6,192	37.46	1	7
Democratic Alliance	4,966	30.07	4	5,009	30.31	2	6
Economic Freedom Fighters	1,047	6.34	0	1,086	6.57	1	1
Congress of Masilonyana	1,006	6.09	0	1,019	6.17	1	1
South African Communist Party	898	5.44	0	891	5.39	1	1
Black and White Society	786	4.76	0	761	4.60	1	1
Freedom Front Plus	639	3.87	0	713	4.31	1	1
African Independent Congress	241	1.46	0	243	1.47	1	1
8 other parties	755	4.57	0	614	3.71	0	0
Total	16,514	100.00	10	16,528	100.00	9	19
Valid votes	16,514	97.88		16,528	97.79		
Invalid/blank votes	357	2.12		373	2.21		
Total votes	16,871	100.00		16,901	100.00		
Registered voters/turnout	32,585	51.78		32,585	51.87		

== Financial mismanagement ==
In January 2025, the municipality was listed as one of the top ten municipalities in arrears on their pension contributions.
