= Senekal =

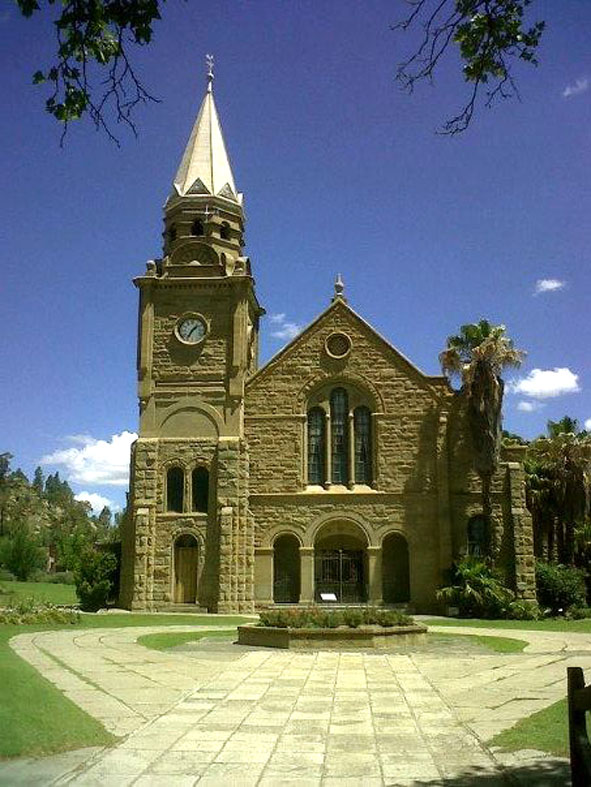
- Dutch Reformed Church in Senekal

- Location within Free State (South African province) Location within South Africa Location within Africa
- Coordinates: 28°19′S 27°36′E
- Country: South Africa
- Province: Free State
- District: Thabo Mofutsanyane
- Municipality: Setsoto
- Established: 1877

Government
  - Type: Local Government
  - Councillors: Mrs M Mthimkhulu (Ward 3); Mrs M Motsei (Ward 5); Mr M Silasi (Ward 6); Mr L Modire (Ward 7) (ANC)

Area
  - Total: 32.9 km^{2} (12.7 sq mi)

Population (2011)
  - Total: 3,466
  - Density: 105/km^{2} (273/sq mi)

Racial makeup (2011)
  - Black African: 53.3%
  - Coloured: 1.4%
  - Indian/Asian: 1.7%
  - White: 42.8%
  - Other: 0.8%

First languages (2011)
  - Sotho: 47.4%
  - Afrikaans: 45.8%
  - English: 3.0%
  - Other: 3.8%
- Time zone: UTC+2 (SAST)
- Postal code (street): 9600
- PO box: 9600
- Area code: 058 481
- Website: http://www.senekal.biz

Senekal is a town situated on the banks of the Sand River in the eastern part of the Free State province of South Africa. It was named after Commandant FP Senekal, who led the encroachment of Basotho lands with the Boers under the Orange Free State government. Senekal died in 1865 during a skirmish known as Senekal's War.

It is the second largest town in Setsoto Municipality after Ficksburg, the seat of Setsoto. Senekal lies on the N5 national road between Winburg on the west and Bethlehem to the east. It has two townships, Matwabeng and OR Tambo Section, the latter being the latest, largest and fastest growing.

== Background ==
Senekal combined with its townships has two police stations, correctional facilities, one hospital and three functioning clinics with the fourth still underway in OR Tambo Section. It has a radio station, Naledi Community radio station, which serves most parts of the Eastern Free State and small parts of Lesotho. It broadcasts on 103.9 MHz.

Farming around Senekal plays a vital role in the economy of the province and country at large. Produce includes maize, sunflower, wheat, milk and livestock.

The two most spoken official languages around Senekal are Afrikaans and Sesotho, the latter being the most widely spoken.

Places of interest in Senekal include Arizona Game Reserve, Ha Mastefane, Biddulphs Mountain Resort and Willem Pretorius Game Reserve, though in Matjhabeng, falls under Setsoto Boundaries. One of the oldest churches in the Free State can be found at the centre of the town. The church is fenced with petrified wood, originally excavated from farms nearby.

== Farm attacks and 2020 protests ==
In October 2018 rural safety in the Senekal area was thrown in the spotlight when Mr Mandeni Johannes Moloi was murdered on his farm, after several break in attempts at his house. Two alleged perpetrators were arrested, and the DA proposed the establishment of rural safety units.

On 6 October 2020, agricultural leaders and community members protested outside the Senekal Magistrate Court, as the trial of Mahlamba and Matlaletsa, the accused killers of farm manager Brendin Horner, commenced. Protesters stormed the court and a police car was turned over and allegedly set on fire. Various groups and public figures, including Police Minister Bheki Cele, Justice and Correctional Services Minister Ronald Lamola, Free State Premier Sisi Ntombela and the Police and Prisons Civil Rights Union, condemned the occurrences. Their next court appearance of 16 October was once again accompanied by demonstrations from different groups outside the court building.

== Notable people from Senekal ==
- Anna Elizabeth Botha – former First Lady of South Africa
- Naka Drotské – former rugby player and coach of the Free State Cheetahs
- Toks van der Linde – former rugby player and TV personality

== See also ==
- Senekal Commando
- Senekal's War
