= Paul Hendrik Roux =

Boer general and Protestant pastor (1862–1911)

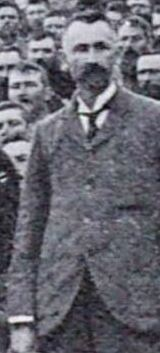

Personal details
- Born: 28 September 1862 Hopetown, South Africa
- Died: 8 June 1911 (aged 48) Beaufort-Wes, South Africa
- Spouse: Hester Helena Eksteen (1864-?)
- Education: Stellenbosch
- Profession: Protestant pastor, boer general

Military service
- Allegiance: Orange Free State
- Years of service: 1899–1902
- Rank: General
- Commands: Brandwater Basin
- Battles/wars: Second Boer War

Paul Hendrik Roux (28 September 1862 – 8 June 1911) was a Second Boer War general and a Protestant pastor in the Dutch Reformed Church in South Africa (NGK).

== Early career (1862-1899) ==
In 1862 Roux was born in the Cape Colony as the eldest son of Dirk Hendrik Dietz Roux (Paarl, 1821 - Paarl, 1895) and Francina Johanna Roux (from the Danish Wiid family, Hopetown, 1841 – Paarl, 1921). He studied at Stellenbosch Theological Institute in the years 1884–1889, and was ordained in 1891. Roux worked as an assistant preacher in Johannesburg and became a pastor in his own right at Vredefort (1891) in Orange Free State, and later at Senekal (1897).

== Second Boer War (1899–1902) ==
=== Almoner and general ===
After the outbreak of the Second Boer War Roux served the troops from his home town of Senekal first as an almoner in the Colony of Natal, but later he was appointed general by Orange Free State president M. T. Steyn after general de Villiers was fatally wounded. In July 1900 he joined General Christiaan de Wet's Commando in the Brandwater Basin.

=== Arrest and imprisonment ===
Orange Free State General Marthinus Prinsloo and his men guarded the mountain passes of the Drakensberg while general De Wet would retreat northward with 2000 men. General Paul Roux would head to the south-west with another 2000 men, while general Jonathan Crowther would go east with 500 men. Indeed, De Wet escaped escorting president Steyn, but the remainder of the army dithered, failed to defend the pass Slabbert's Nek and gave up the other pass of Retief's Nek after a fight on 23–24 July 1900.

Prinsloo and Roux quarreled as to who was in command. A first vote favoured Prinsloo, but later incoming votes gave Roux the edge. The British surrounded Prinsloo by also blocking the passes of Witnek, Kommandonek, and Noupoortsnek (Nauwpoortsnek), so that Prinsloo felt forced to surrender with all troops to general Archibald Hunter on 30 July 1900.

However Roux disagreed and personally went to Hunter to protest, and was arrested on the spot. Some 4300 troops including Prinsloo, Roux and Crowther were taken prisoner of war near Fouriesburg, most of them at Surrender Hill. This was the largest number of Boers captured in the war so far, even more than the 4000 at the surrender of general Piet Cronjé at Paardeberg on 27 February 1900. The British sent most of the prisoners to Diyatalawa at Ceylon (Sri Lanka), including Roux himself. There Roux again worked as a pastor. Prinsloo's surrender in 1900 was viewed by some of his compatriots as a treasonous act. Christiaan de Wet called it "a horrible murder of government, country and people" (Afrikaans: ’n gruwelike moord op regering, land en volk).

== After the war (1902-1911) ==
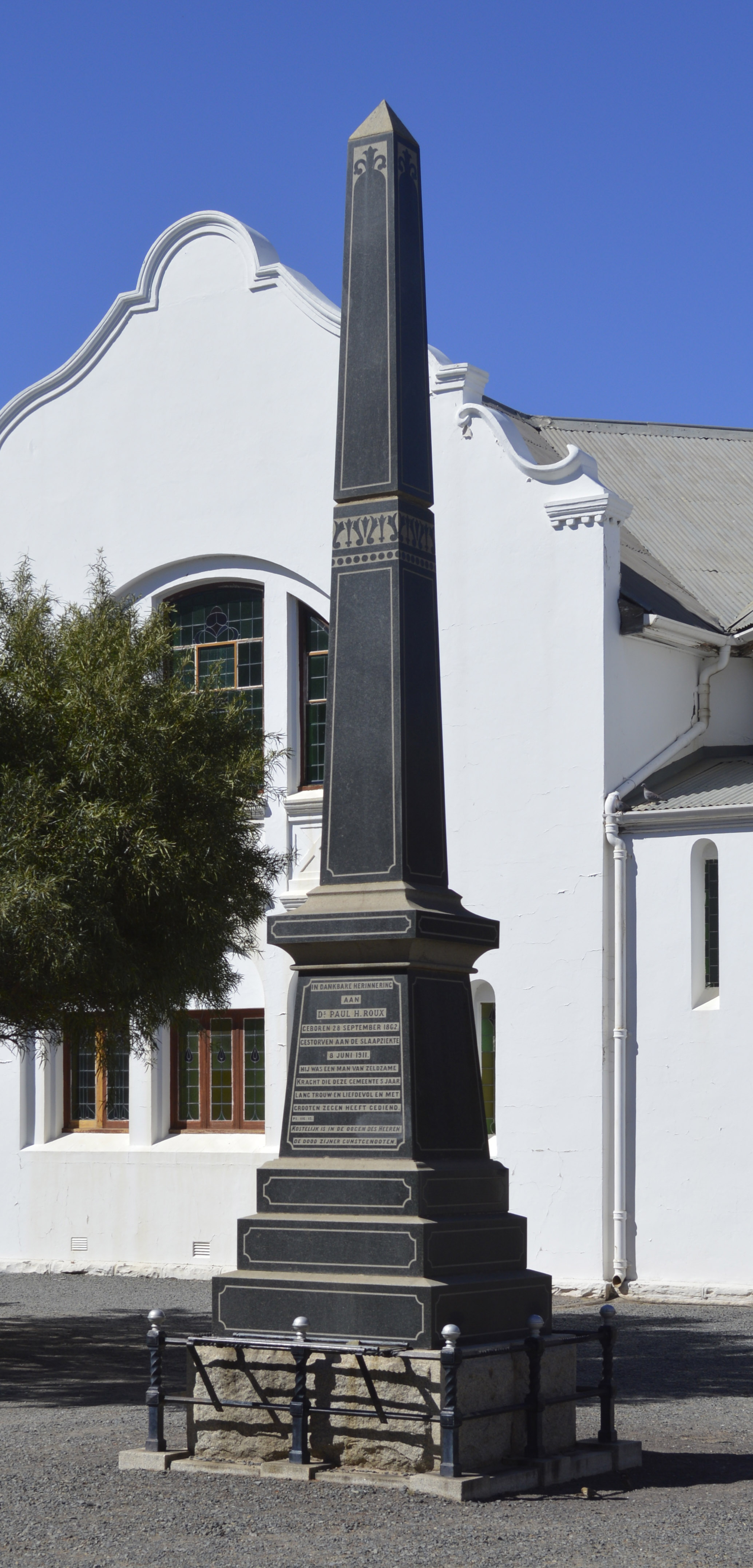
1915 Memorial monument for Reverend Paul Roux in Beaufort-West, 2013.

Roux returned from imprisonment at Ceylon and continued as a Dutch Reformed pastor at Senekal. In 1905 he became pastor at Beaufort-Wes, where he died in 1911 of sleeping sickness (African trypanosomiasis), contracted during his missionary work in Nyasaland (now Malawi). In his honour a memorial was erected in 1915 near the Dutch Reformed Church in Beaufort West. The town of Paul Roux was named after him.

== See also ==
- Paul Roux, the South African town named after him

== Bibliography ==
- Bossenbroek, M. P. and Yvette Rosenberg (Translator), The Boer War, Seven Stories Press, New York, NY, 2018. ISBN 9781609807474, 1609807472.
- Breytenbach, J. H. (1983). Die Britse Opmars tot in Pretoria [The British advance to Pretoria]. Die Geskiedenis van die Tweede Vryheidsoorlog in Suid-Afrika, 1899–1902 (in Afrikaans). Vol. V. Pretoria: Die Staatsdrukker. ISBN 9780621083606. OCLC 769254652. Page 400.
- Breytenbach, J. H. (1996). Die beleg van Mafeking tot met die Slag van Bergendal [The siege of Mafeking up to the Battle of Bergendal]. Die Geskiedenis van die Tweede Vryheidsoorlog in Suid-Afrika, 1899–1902 (in Afrikaans). Vol. VI. Pretoria: Die Staatsdrukker. ISBN 9780797033214. OCLC 813492747. Pages 231 and 236.
- De Wet, Christiaan Rudolf, Three Years War (October 1899 – June 1902), Archibald Constable and Co Ltd, Westminster, 1902. Translation of the original book in Dutch De strijd tusschen Boer en Brit, Amsterdam; Pretoria, 1902.
- Grobler, J. E. H., The War Reporter: the Anglo-Boer war through the eyes of the burghers, Johannesburg: Jonathan Ball Publishers, 2004. ISBN 978-1-86842-186-2. Pages 65, 80, 82 (photo)-83, 87, 89, 91,108, and 131.
- Moll JC (1961). "Roux, Paul Hendrik". In Beyers CJ (ed.). Dictionary of South African Biography Vol IV (1st ed.). Durban and Pretoria: Butterworth & Co (SA). pp. 521–522. ISBN 0409 09183 9. OCLC 1063845175.
- Pakenham, Thomas, The Boer War, George Weidenfeld & Nicolson, London, 1979. Abacus, 1992. ISBN 0 349 10466 2.
- Viljoen, B. J., My Reminiscences of the Anglo-Boer War, 1902.
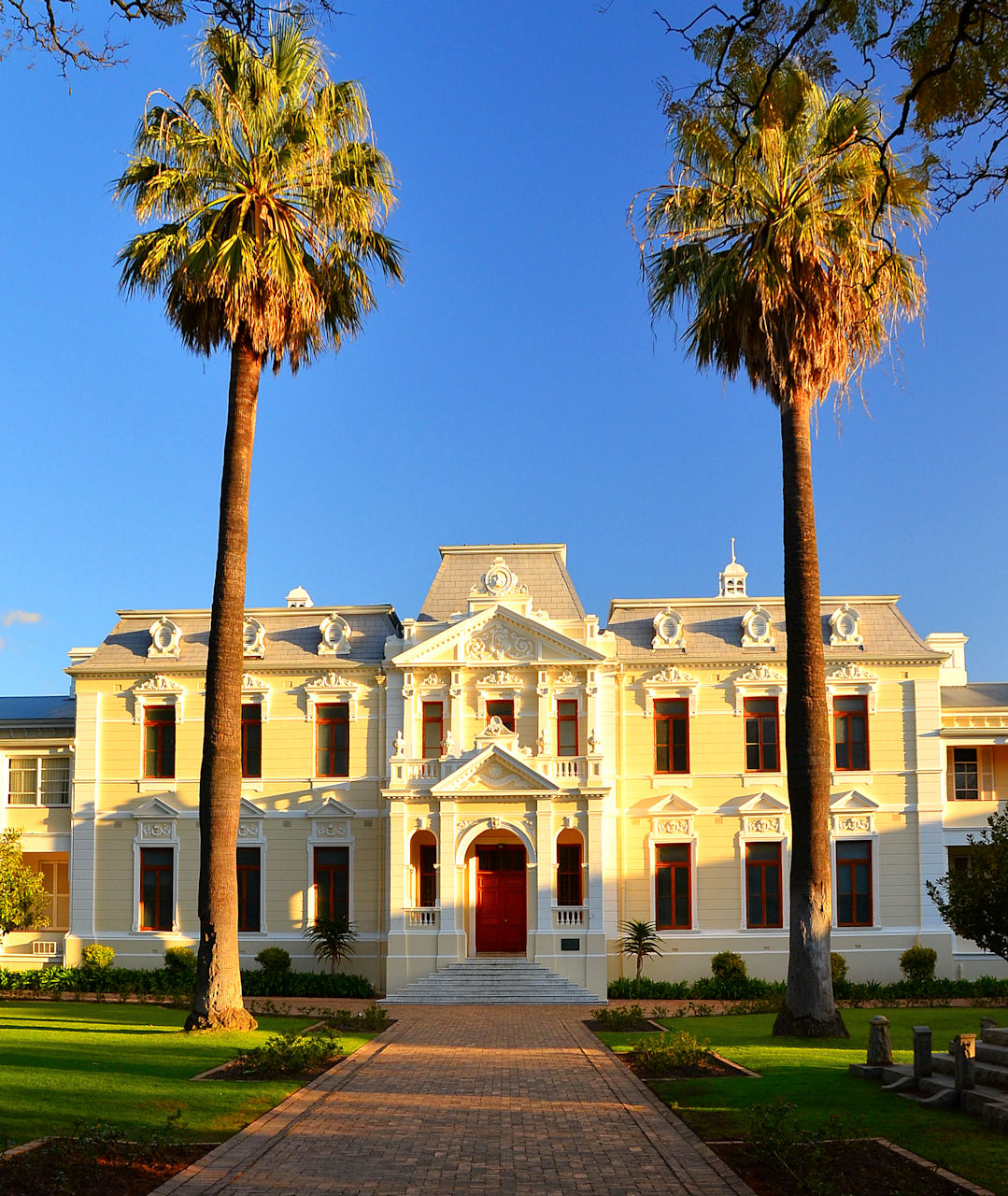
Theological Seminary, Stellenbosch, 2012.

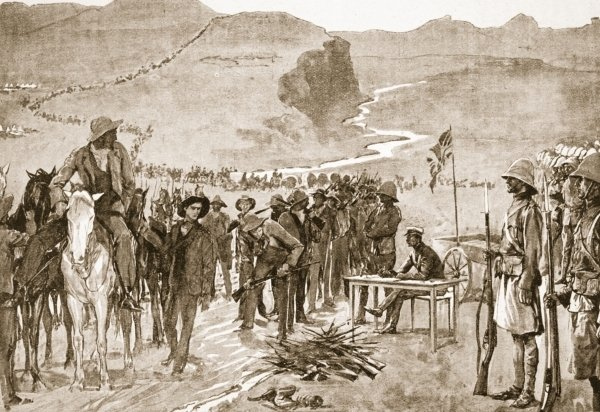
The massive surrender of Prinsloo's Boer forces including Roux's men in Brandwater basin, South Africa, 1900. Unknown artist. From Archibald Forbes et al.: Battles of the Nineteenth Century, Vol. 7, around 1902.

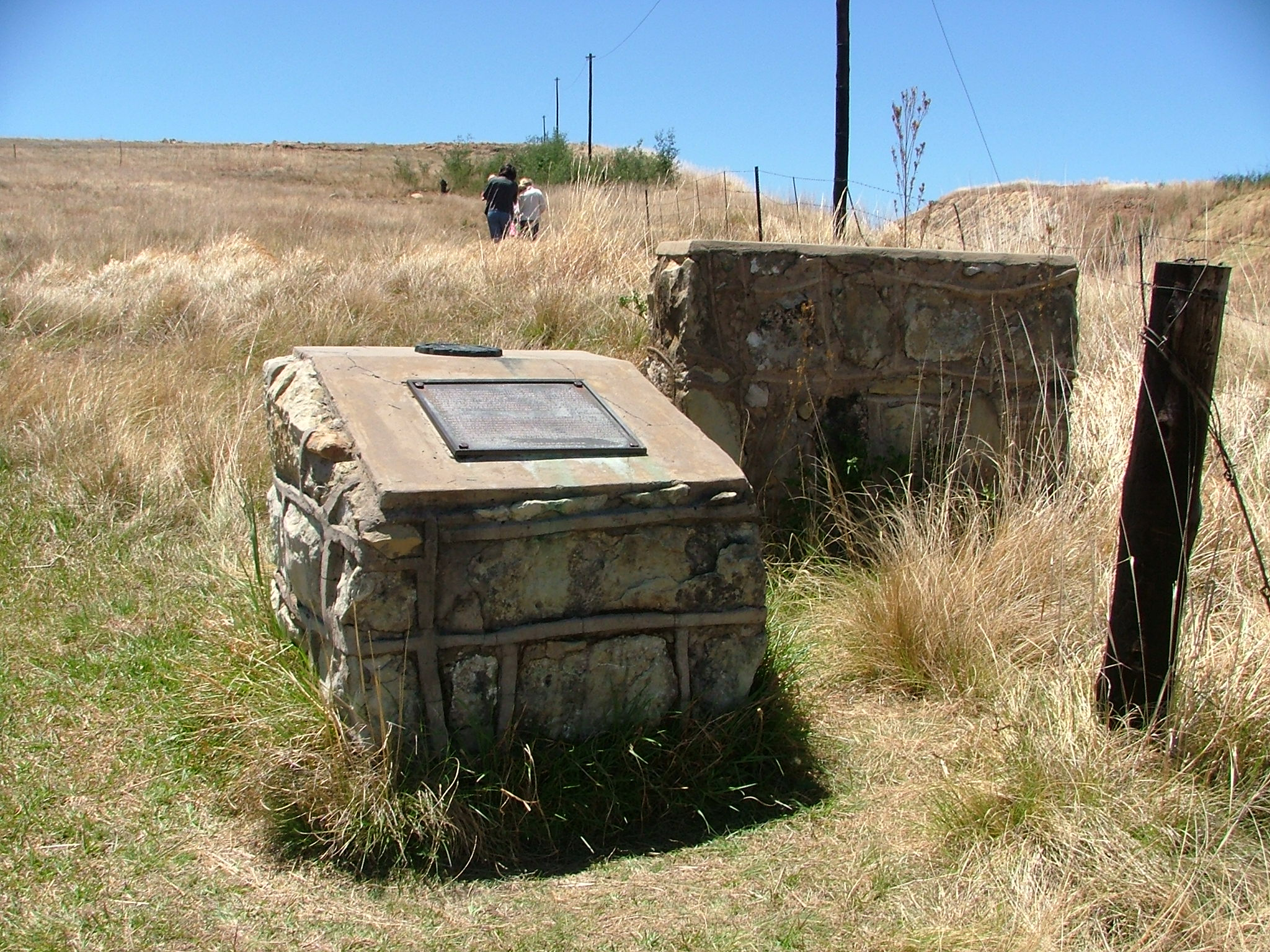
1986 Surrender Hill monument, beside the Clarens-Fouriesburg road in the eastern Orange Free State, South Africa. Photograph 2011.

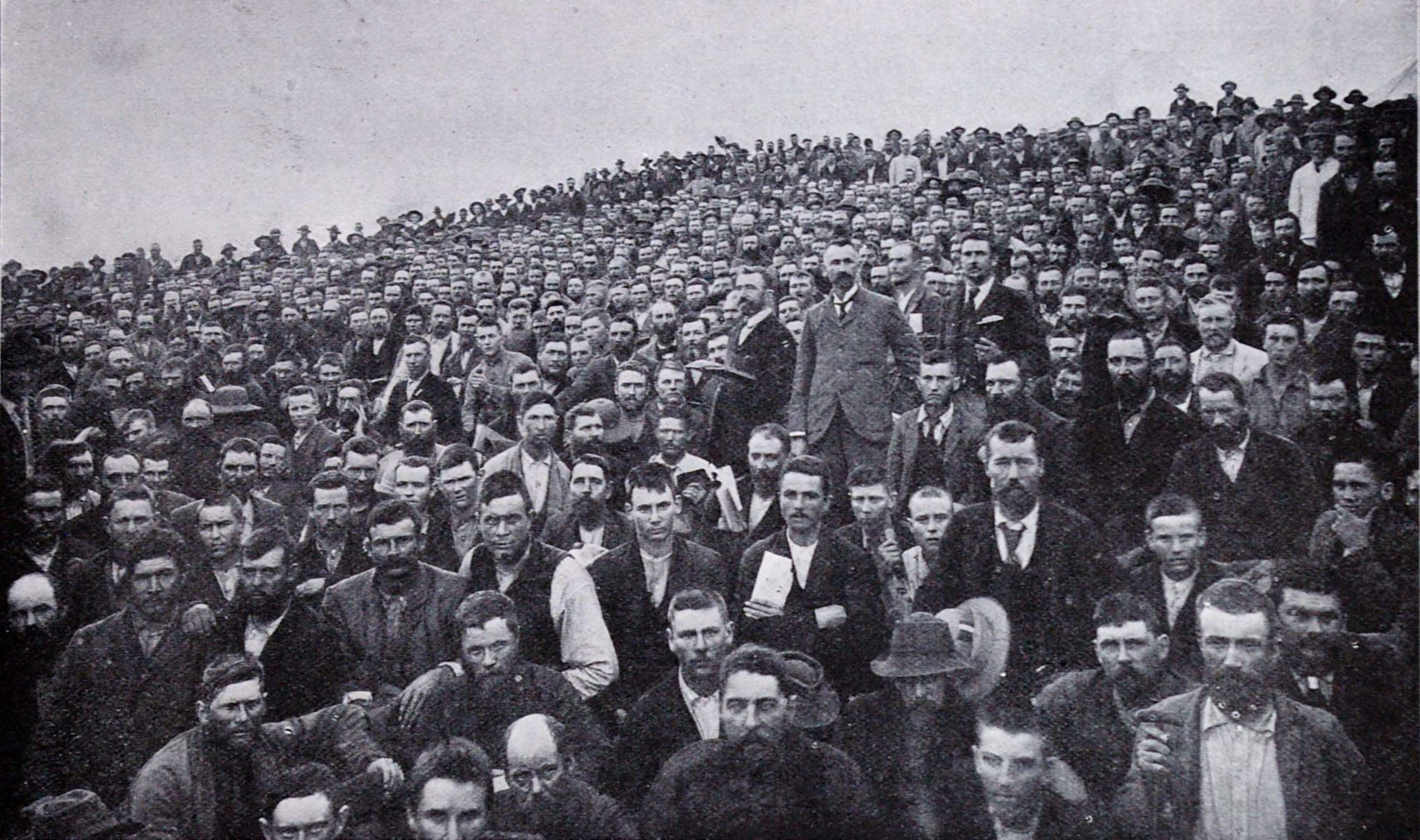
Boer prisoners including Roux at Ceylon, mainly taken at Surrender Hill in 1900. Photograph around 1901.
