= Brandwater Basin =

Drainage basin of the Brandwater River

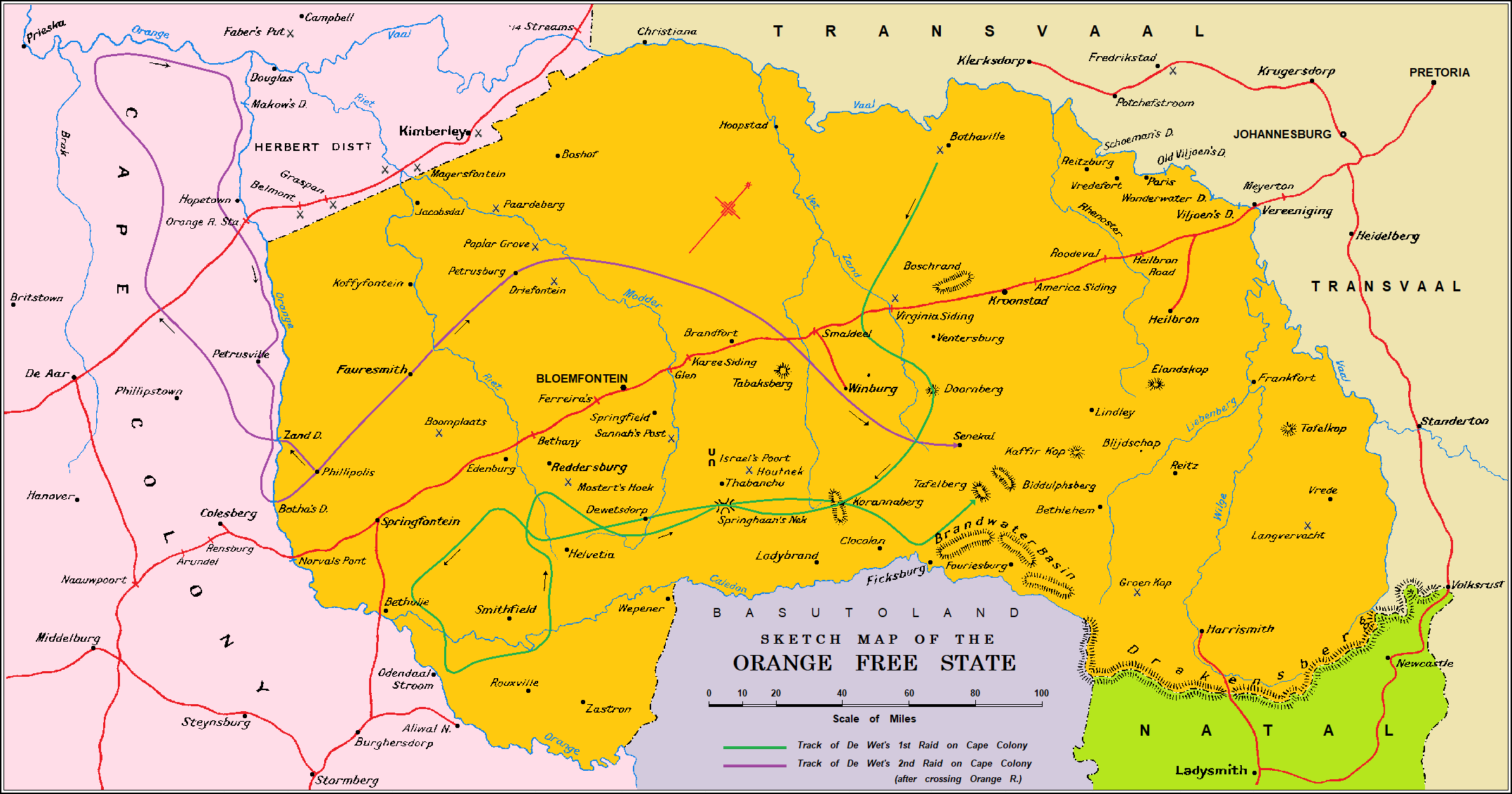
Map of the historical Orange Free State (orange), with the Brandwater Basin bottom center to the north east of Basutoland (Lesotho, grey).

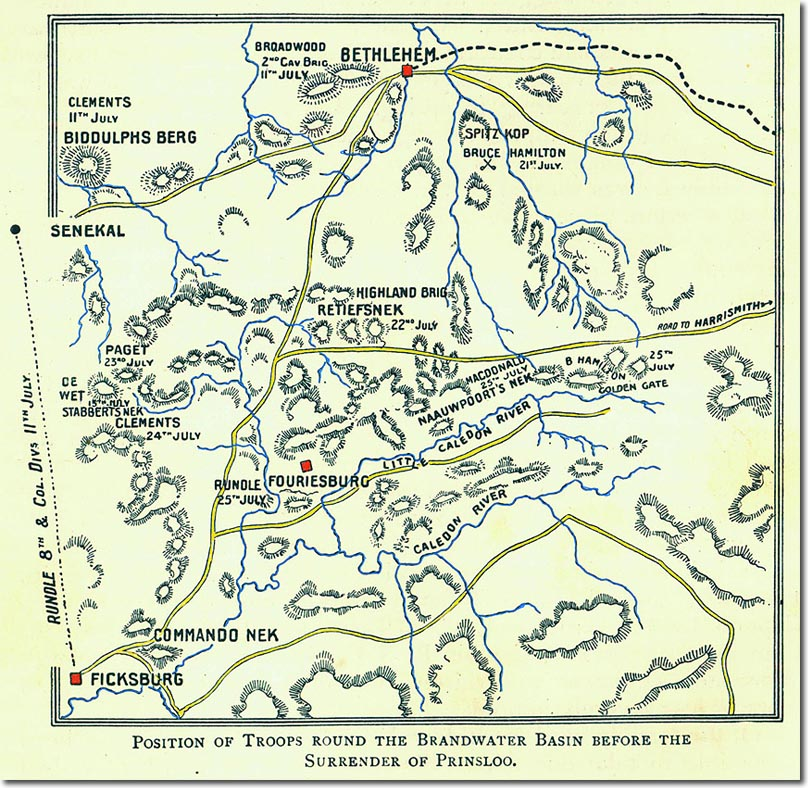
The Brandwater Basin in Orange Free State, South Africa, 1900. The position of the blocking British troops before the surrender of Prinsloo is shown.

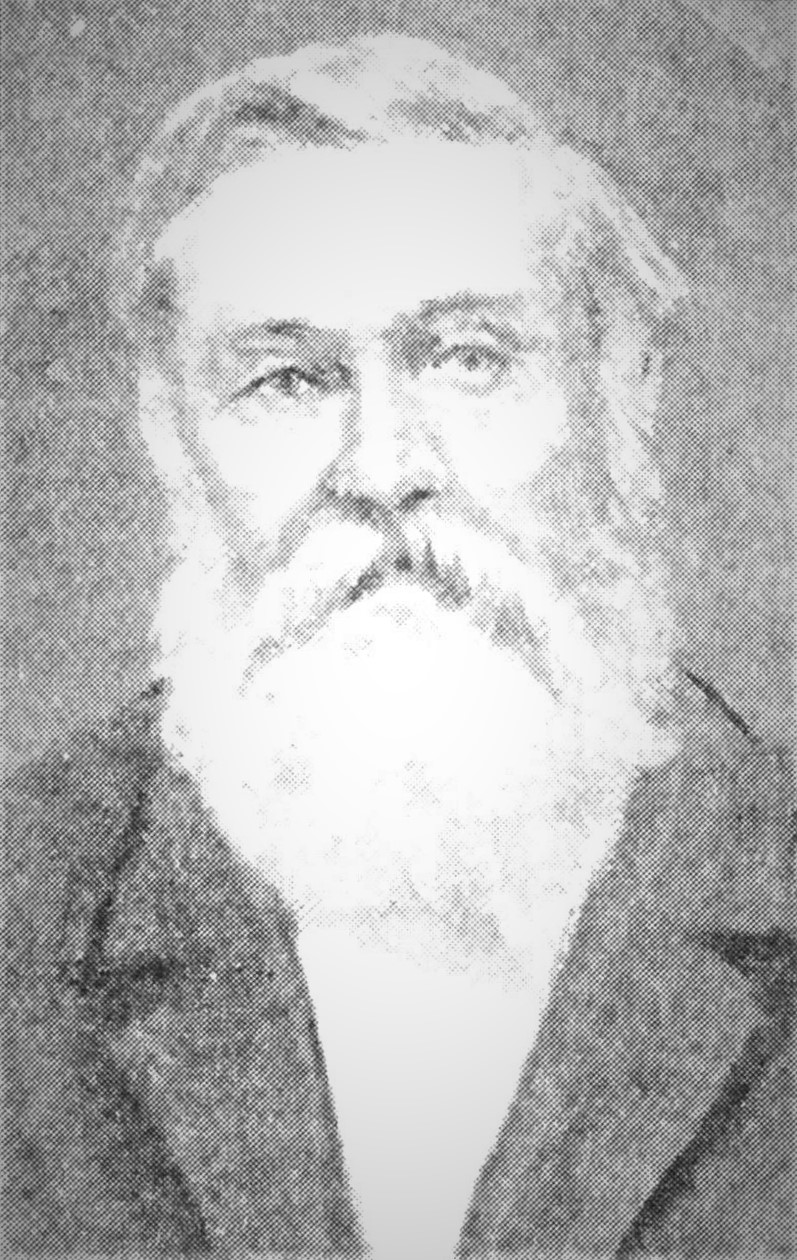
Marthinus Prinsloo (1838–1903)

The Brandwater Basin is the drainage basin of the Brandwater River (Afrikaans: Brandwaterrivier), a tributary of the Grootspruit River in the south-east of Orange Free State, South Africa, north of Lesotho. The basin is situated south of Bethlehem and south-east of Senekal, between the Witteberg (White Mountains) to the west and north, the Rooiberge (Red Mountains) to the east, and the Drakensberg over the Caledon River to the south. It is also northwest of the Slaapkrans Basin (Afrikaans: Slaapkransbekken) and the Maloti Mountains on the northern border of Lesotho. Towns in the Brandwater Basin are Fouriesburg, founded in 1892, and Clarens, established in 1912.

== Mountain passes ==
The main entry and exit points of the Brandwater Basin south of Bethlehem are a number of mountain passes, in clockwise order from the north: Retief's Nek, Naauwpoort's Nek (Noupoortsnek), Golden Gate east of Clarens, Kommando Nek (Commando Nek) north east of Ficksburg, and Slabbert's Nek south east of Senekal. Minor passes are Witnek, Nelspoort, and Bamboeshoek.

== 1900 Boer surrender by Prinsloo in the Brandwater Basin ==
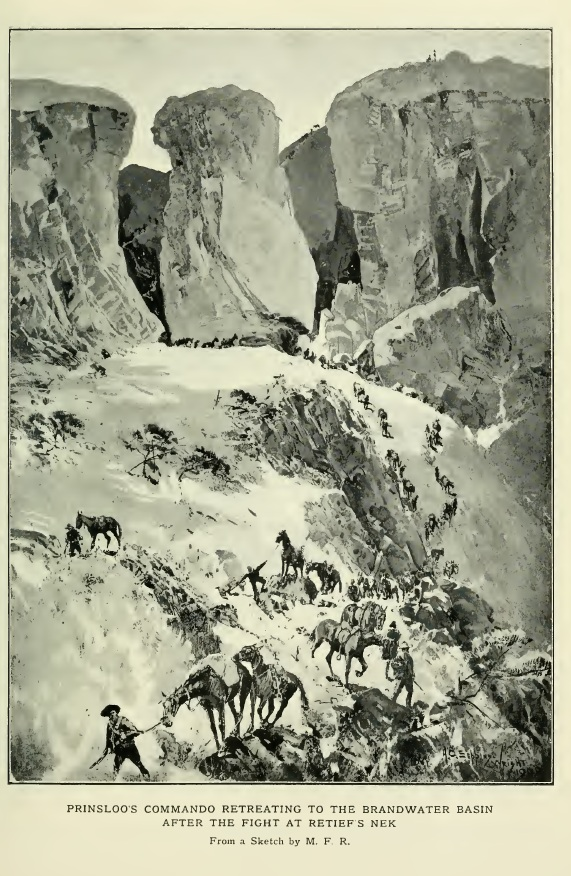
Prinsloo's Commando in the mountains retreating to the Brandwater Basin below after the lost fight at Retief's Nek on 23–24 July 1900.

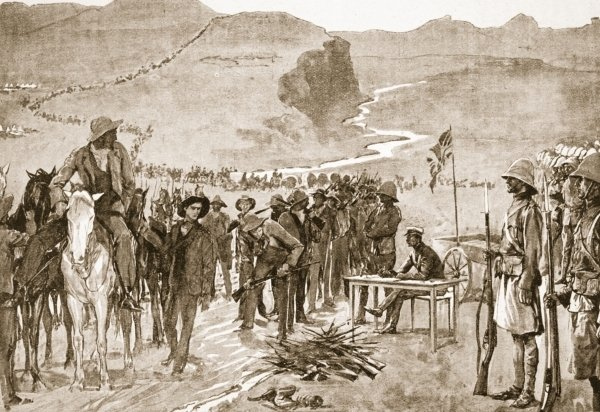
Prinsloo's Boer forces surrender en masse handing over their Mauser Model 1895 rifles near Surrender Hill, starting 30 July 1900. Drawing around 1902.

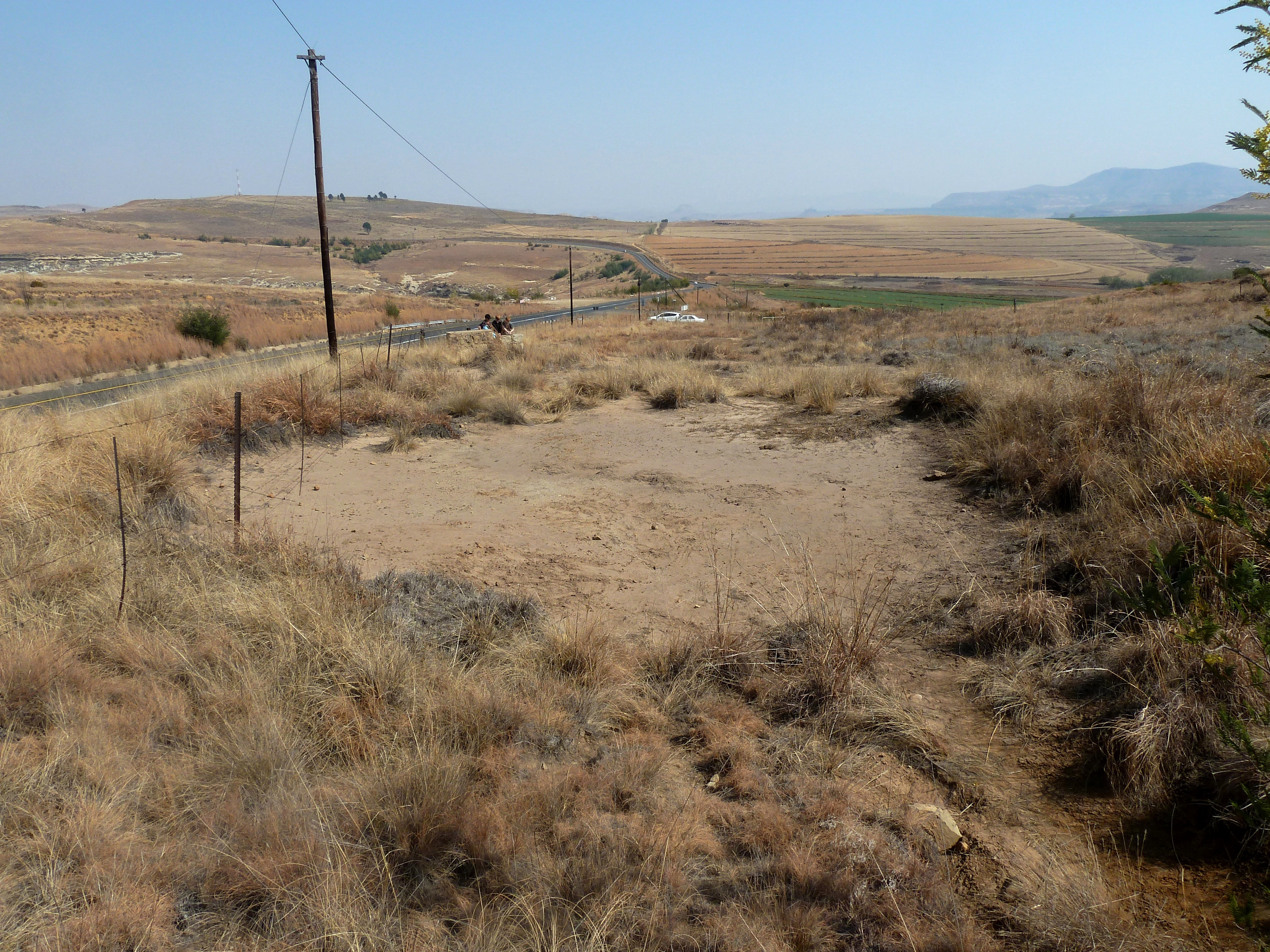
Sandkol, hot sandy hill near Surrender Hill, on the R711 road, Slaapkrans, Orange Free State. Photo 2015.

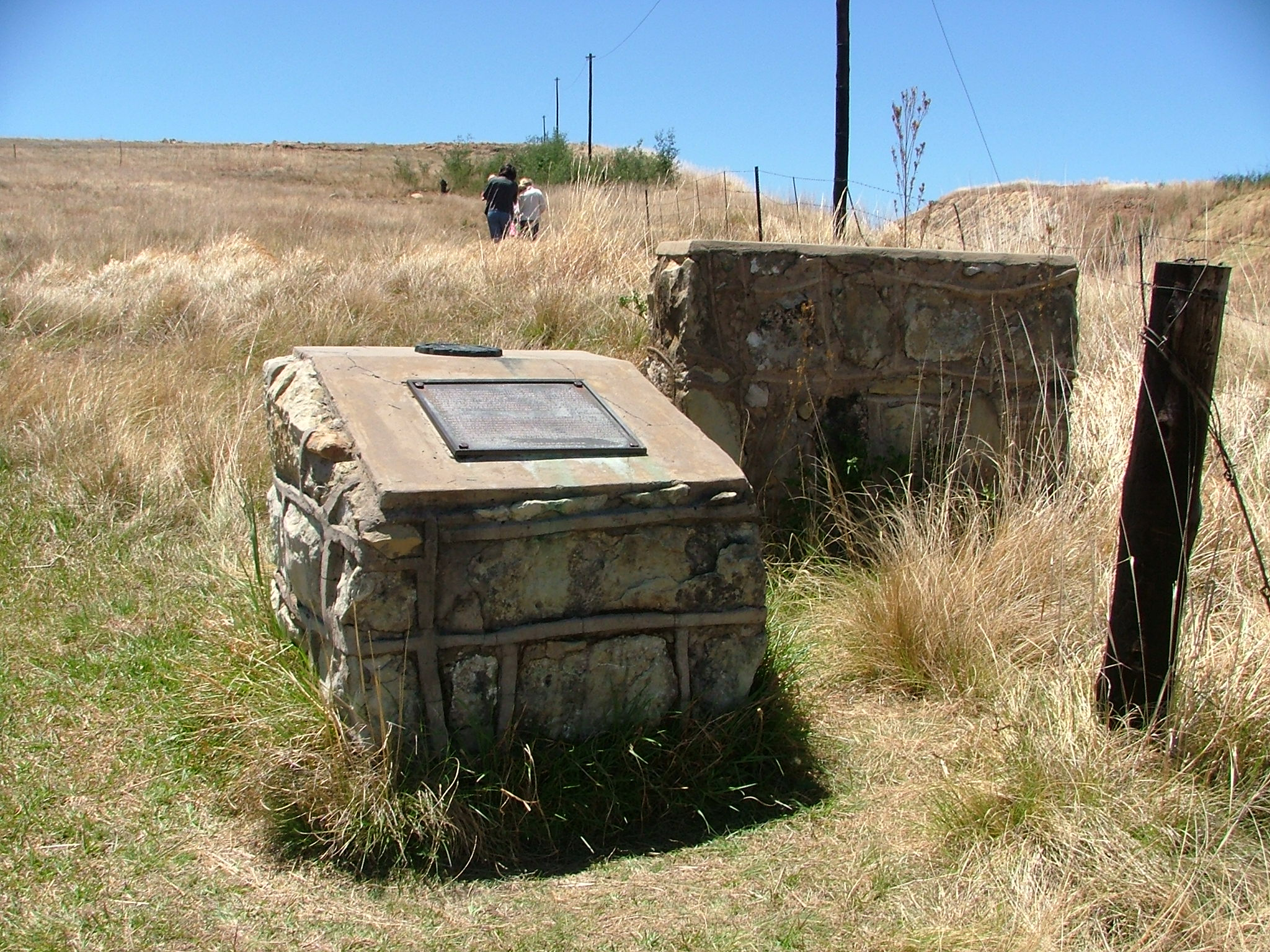
Surrender Hill monument in Brandwater Basin, beside the Clarens-Fouriesburg road. Photo 2011.

The Brandwater Basin was the scene of a massive surrender of Boer troops under the command of General Marthinus Prinsloo in the Anglo-Boer War on 30 July 1900. After British troops had taken both the Boer state capitals of Bloemfontein (13 March 1900) and Pretoria (5 June 1900), Prinsloo and his men guarded the mountain passes of the Drakensberg at the Brandwater Basin. Generals Christiaan de Wet, Paul Roux and Jonathan Crowther would each retreat from the Brandwater Basin with their troops northwards and eastwards. De Wet indeed escaped escorting president Steyn, while the remainder of the Boer army instead failed to defend the pass Slabbert's Nek on 15 July 1900 and gave up Retief's Nek after a fight on 23–24 July 1900.

The British surrounded Prinsloo by also blocking the passes of Witnek, Kommandonek, Noupoortsnek (Nauwpoortsnek) and finally the Golden Gate pass to the east on the Little Caledon River, so that Prinsloo felt forced to surrender with his army to general Archibald Hunter on 30 July 1900. Boer general Piet Fourie or general Jan Hendrik Olivier had got away with 1500 men and several commanders in the east over the Golden Gate pass in time.

Some 4300 of his troops including Prinsloo, Roux and Crowther were taken prisoner of war near Fouriesburg, most of them at Surrender Hill. This was the largest number of Boers captured in the war so far, even more than the 4000 at the surrender of general Piet Cronjé at Paardeberg on 27 February 1900. While most of the prisoners from Prinsloo's army were sent to Ceylon, Prinsloo himself was held captive at Simon's Town. Prinsloo's surrender in 1900 was viewed by some of his compatriots as a treasonous act. Christiaan de Wet called it a "a horrible murder of government, country and people" (Afrikaans: ’n gruwelike moord op regering, land en volk).

== Literature ==
- M. P. Bossenbroek, Yvette Rosenberg (Translator), The Boer War, Seven Stories Press, New York, NY, 2018. ISBN 9781609807474, 1609807472. Pages 284–285.
- Thomas Pakenham, The Boer War, George Weidenfeld & Nicolson, London, 1979. Abacus, 1992. ISBN 0 349 10466 2. Pages 438, 441–445.
