= Jonathan Crowther (general) =

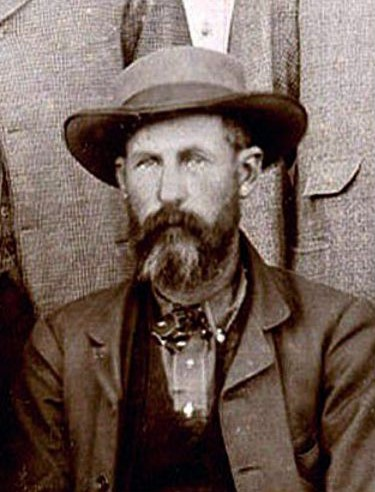
- Jonathan Crowther (1853–1926) as a British prisoner of war

Personal details
- Born: 20 October 1853
- Died: 24 November 1926 (aged 73) Bankies, Ladybrand, Motheo, Orange Free State, South Africa
- Occupation: Boer war general

Military service
- Allegiance: Orange Free State
- Battles/wars: Second Boer War

Jonathan Crowther (also Jan Crowther, 20 October 1853 – 24 November 1926) was a Boer war general.

== Family ==
Crowther was the eldest son among in total six daughters and five sons of Robert August Frederick Crowther (England, 10 August 1822 – Ladybrand district, 28 January 1889), an immigrant from the United Kingdom, and Louisa Catharina Maria Sophia Lubbe (Colesberg, Northern Cape, 10 February 1836 – Clocolan, Orange Free State, 6 August 1910). Jonathan Crowther married Cecilia Johanna Petronella Delport (Oudtshoorn, Western Cape, 20 July 1856 – Vegkop, Heilbron, Orange Free State, 1 August 1941) and had a daughter and a son by her.

== Second Boer War ==
=== Action at Ladybrand ===
After the outbreak of the Second Boer War in October 1899 Crowther became the commander of the Ladybrand and Ficksburg commandos and later fighting general (Afrikaans: veggeneraal). When the British under Thomas Pilcher had captured Ladybrand, Crowther at the request of President Martinus Theunis Steyn reoccupied the town on 26 March 1900 after the British had fled and arrested traitors who had cooperated with Pilcher. Upon the British breakthrough Commandant-General Christiaan de Wet marched to the Sand River to check the advance of the British there. He ordered Crowther with other generals to stay behind to protect the eastern Free State, the granary of the Republic.

=== Surrender in Brandwater Basin ===
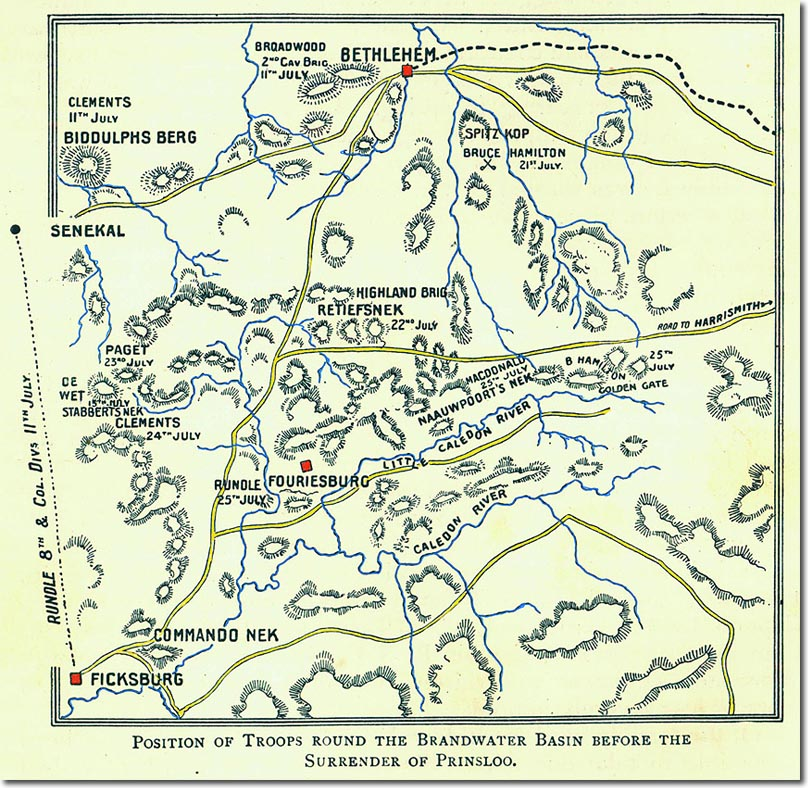
Sketch map of Brandwater Basin with mountains passes, 1900.

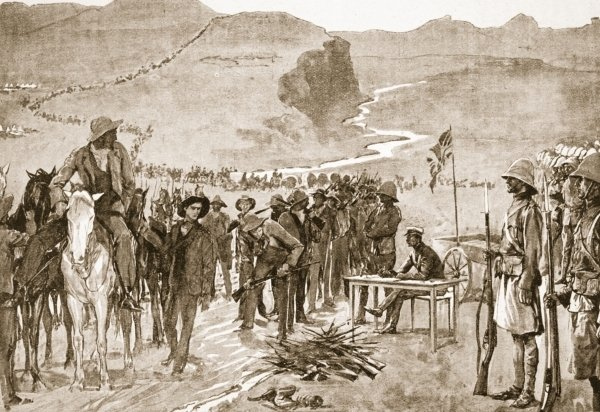
Boer soldiers surrender and hand over their Mauser Model 1895 rifles to the British, near Surrender Hill, Brandwater Basin, South Africa, 1900.

Crowther retreated to positions in the Brandwater Basin guarding the passes of the Drakensberg escarpment, under the higher command of Marthinus Prinsloo. De Wet left the Basin on the night of 15 July 1900 with 2000 men and president Steyn and the other members of the Orange Free State government. Another 2000 men were to escape the Basin to the south-west, led by general Paul Hendrik Roux. Crowther would go east with 500 men. However, after the departure of De Wet and his party the remaining Boers dithered and the British captured the mountain passes of Slabbert's Nek and Retief's Nek on 23 and 24 July 1900. They locked Prinsloo, Roux and Crowther in by also blocking the passes of Witnek, Kommandonek, Noupoortsnek (Nauwpoortsnek) and the Golden Gate. Prinsloo felt forced to surrender with all his troops, including Crowther's, to the British general Archibald Hunter on 30 July 1900. Some 4300 troops with Prinsloo, Roux and Crowther were taken prisoner of war near Fouriesburg, most of them at Surrender Hill. Subsequently, they were transported to a prisoner of war camp at Diyatalawa, Ceylon, where a total of 4785 Boer war prisoners were kept.

=== Release from Ceylon ===
After the conclusion of the war by the Treaty of Vereeniging on 31 May 1902, they were to be released and returned by ship to South Africa. Crowther left Ceylon for South Africa on 7 August 1902, with 26 other released Boer officers in a second batch of 400 prisoners of war.

== Literature ==
- Bossenbroek, M. P., Rosenberg, Yvette (Translator), The Boer War, Seven Stories Press, New York, NY, 2018. ISBN 9781609807474, 1609807472. Page 284.
- Breytenbach, J. H. (1969–1996). Die Geskiedenis van die Tweede Vryheidsoorlog in Suid-Afrika, 1899–1902 [The History of the Second War of Independence in South Africa, 1899–1902] (in Afrikaans). Pretoria: Die Staatsdrukker.
  - Breytenbach, J. H. (1977). Die Boereterugtog uit Kaapland [The Boer retreat from the Cape Colony]. Die Geskiedenis van die Tweede Vryheidsoorlog in Suid-Afrika, 1899–1902 (in Afrikaans). Vol. IV. Pretoria: Die Staatsdrukker. Page 441.
  - Breytenbach, J. H. (1983). Die Britse Opmars tot in Pretoria [The British advance to Pretoria]. Die Geskiedenis van die Tweede Vryheidsoorlog in Suid-Afrika, 1899–1902 (in Afrikaans). Vol. V. Pretoria: Die Staatsdrukker. ISBN 9780621083606. OCLC 769254652. Pages 71, 116, 145-146, 150, 152, and 299.
  - Breytenbach, J. H. (1996). Die beleg van Mafeking tot met die Slag van Bergendal [The siege of Mafeking up to the Battle of Bergendal]. Die Geskiedenis van die Tweede Vryheidsoorlog in Suid-Afrika, 1899–1902 (in Afrikaans). Vol. VI. Pretoria: Die Staatsdrukker. ISBN 9780797033214. OCLC 813492747.. Page 216.
- Grobler, J. E. H., The War Reporter: the Anglo-Boer war through the eyes of the burghers, Johannesburg: Jonathan Ball Publishers, 2004. ISBN 978-1-86842-186-2. Pages 53, 65, 87, 89, 91, and 108.
- Pakenham, Thomas, The Boer War, George Weidenfeld & Nicolson, London, 1979. Abacus, 1992. ISBN 0 349 10466 2. Page 443.
