= Dihlabeng Local Municipality elections =

Local elections in the Free State, South Africa

The Dihlabeng Local Municipality council consists of thirty-eight members elected by mixed-member proportional representation. Nineteen councillors are elected by first-past-the-post voting in nineteen wards, while the remaining nineteen are chosen from party lists so that the total number of party representatives is proportional to the number of votes received.

In the election of 3 August 2016 the African National Congress (ANC) won a majority of twenty-five seats on the council.

In the 2021 South African municipal elections, the ANC won a reduced majority of twenty-three seats.

The ANC lost its majority in the 2026 South African municipal elections, but remained the largest party, with 18 seats.

== Results ==
The following table shows the composition of the council after past elections.

Event	ANC	DA	EFF	FF+	PAC	Other	Total
2000 election	21	6	—	—	5	2	34
2006 election	29	5	—	2	1	0	37
2011 election	30	8	—	1	0	1	40
2016 election	25	8	3	1	—	2	39
2021 election	23	7	4	2	—	4	40
2026 election	18	12	2	2	0	6	38

== December 2000 election ==
The following table shows the results of the 2000 election.

Party	Ward			List			Total seats
Party	Votes	%	Seats	Votes	%	Seats	Total seats
African National Congress	16,773	61.52	13	17,053	62.41	8	21
Democratic Alliance	4,577	16.79	3	4,902	17.94	3	6
Pan Africanist Congress of Azania	3,455	12.67	1	3,577	13.09	4	5
Bohlokong Civic Association	967	3.55	0	1,027	3.76	1	1
Alliance 2000+	1,063	3.90	0	763	2.79	1	1
Independent candidates	431	1.58	0				0
Total	27,266	100.00	17	27,322	100.00	17	34
Valid votes	27,266	97.91		27,322	98.13		
Invalid/blank votes	582	2.09		521	1.87		
Total votes	27,848	100.00		27,843	100.00		
Registered voters/turnout	55,271	50.38		55,271	50.38		

== March 2006 election ==
The following table shows the results of the 2006 election.

Party	Ward			List			Total seats
Party	Votes	%	Seats	Votes	%	Seats	Total seats
African National Congress	22,932	78.25	16	21,940	76.27	13	29
Democratic Alliance	3,770	12.86	3	3,513	12.21	2	5
Freedom Front Plus	1,355	4.62	0	1,221	4.24	2	2
Pan Africanist Congress of Azania	899	3.07	0	1,410	4.90	1	1
African Christian Democratic Party	318	1.09	0	563	1.96	0	0
National Democratic Convention	31	0.11	0	121	0.42	0	0
Total	29,305	100.00	19	28,768	100.00	18	37
Valid votes	29,305	97.15		28,768	97.74		
Invalid/blank votes	860	2.85		666	2.26		
Total votes	30,165	100.00		29,434	100.00		
Registered voters/turnout	61,684	48.90		61,684	47.72		

== May 2011 election ==
The following table shows the results of the 2011 election.

Party	Ward			List			Total seats
Party	Votes	%	Seats	Votes	%	Seats	Total seats
African National Congress	28,494	73.39	18	28,903	74.41	12	30
Democratic Alliance	7,918	20.40	2	7,730	19.90	6	8
Freedom Front Plus	1,020	2.63	0	738	1.90	1	1
Congress of the People	753	1.94	0	877	2.26	1	1
African People's Convention	357	0.92	0	438	1.13	0	0
Pan Africanist Congress of Azania	207	0.53	0	156	0.40	0	0
Independent candidates	74	0.19	0				0
Total	38,823	100.00	20	38,842	100.00	20	40
Valid votes	38,823	98.09		38,842	98.35		
Invalid/blank votes	754	1.91		650	1.65		
Total votes	39,577	100.00		39,492	100.00		
Registered voters/turnout	66,738	59.30		66,738	59.17		

== August 2016 election ==
The following table shows the results of the 2016 election.

Party	Ward			List			Total seats
Party	Votes	%	Seats	Votes	%	Seats	Total seats
African National Congress	25,299	59.86	17	27,565	66.02	8	25
Democratic Alliance	8,267	19.56	1	9,285	22.24	7	8
Economic Freedom Fighters	2,610	6.18	0	3,094	7.41	3	3
Independent candidates	4,697	11.11	2				2
Freedom Front Plus	619	1.46	0	644	1.54	1	1
Leihlo La Setjhaba Rainbow	208	0.49	0	312	0.75	0	0
African Christian Democratic Party	238	0.56	0	242	0.58	0	0
Congress of the People	177	0.42	0	273	0.65	0	0
African People's Convention	100	0.24	0	237	0.57	0	0
United Residents Front	51	0.12	0	99	0.24	0	0
Total	42,266	100.00	20	41,751	100.00	19	39
Valid votes	42,266	97.87		41,751	96.78		
Invalid/blank votes	920	2.13		1,388	3.22		
Total votes	43,186	100.00		43,139	100.00		
Registered voters/turnout	73,214	58.99		73,214	58.92		

== November 2021 election ==
The following table shows the results of the 2021 election.

Party	Ward			List			Total seats
Party	Votes	%	Seats	Votes	%	Seats	Total seats
African National Congress	19,420	55.28	18	19,595	56.11	5	23
Democratic Alliance	4,962	14.12	1	6,450	18.47	6	7
Economic Freedom Fighters	3,450	9.82	0	3,708	10.62	4	4
All Unemployment Labour Alliance	1,731	4.93	0	1,530	4.38	2	2
Independent candidates	2,861	8.14	1				1
Freedom Front Plus	1,046	2.98	0	1,602	4.59	2	2
Forum for Service Delivery	867	2.47	0	827	2.37	1	1
African Christian Democratic Party	208	0.59	0	358	1.03	0	0
African Transformation Movement	181	0.52	0	200	0.57	0	0
Leihlo La Setjhaba Rainbow	174	0.50	0	194	0.56	0	0
Inkatha Freedom Party	83	0.24	0	156	0.45	0	0
Patriotic Front of Azania	75	0.21	0	130	0.37	0	0
Congress of the People	26	0.07	0	123	0.35	0	0
Al Jama-ah	48	0.14	0	52	0.15	0	0
Total	35,132	100.00	20	34,925	100.00	20	40
Valid votes	35,132	97.95		34,925	97.35		
Invalid/blank votes	735	2.05		952	2.65		
Total votes	35,867	100.00		35,877	100.00		
Registered voters/turnout	72,298	49.61		72,298	49.62		

=== By-elections from November 2021 ===
The following by-elections were held to fill vacant ward seats in the period from the election in November 2021.

Date	Ward	Party of the previous councillor	Party of the newly elected councillor
26 April 2023	17	African National Congress	Economic Freedom Fighters

== November 2026 election ==
The following table shows the results of the 2026 election.

Party	Ward			List			Total seats
Party	Votes	%	Seats	Votes	%	Seats	Total seats
African National Congress	18,241	44.14	16	18,769	45.84	2	18
Democratic Alliance	11,364	27.50	3	12,645	30.88	9	12
Freedom Front Plus	2,025	4.90	0	2,455	6.00	2	2
Economic Freedom Fighters	1,994	4.82	0	2,279	5.57	2	2
Independent candidates	2,542	6.15	0				0
ActionSA	938	2.27	0	1,096	2.68	1	1
Patriotic Alliance	768	1.86	0	790	1.93	1	1
South African Communist Party	605	1.46	0	625	1.53	1	1
uMkhonto weSizwe Party	1,165	2.82	0				0
Batho Movement	388	0.94	0	407	0.99	1	1
African Congress for Transformation	281	0.68	0	476	1.16	0	0
African Transformation Movement	188	0.45	0	302	0.74	0	0
African Heart Congress	230	0.56	0	189	0.46	0	0
African Christian Democratic Party	85	0.21	0	260	0.63	0	0
Pan Africanist Congress of Azania	147	0.36	0	184	0.45	0	0
Afrika Mayibuye Movement	132	0.32	0	171	0.42	0	0
African Content Movement	84	0.20	0	109	0.27	0	0
African Movement Congress	79	0.19	0	89	0.22	0	0
African Liberation Movement	64	0.15	0	54	0.13	0	0
All Unemployment Labour Alliance	10	0.02	0	45	0.11	0	0
Total	41,330	100.00	19	40,945	100.00	19	38
Valid votes	41,330	98.19		40,945	97.80		
Invalid/blank votes	763	1.81		921	2.20		
Total votes	42,093	100.00		41,866	100.00		
Registered voters/turnout	77,595	54.25		77,595	53.95		
