= Marthinus Prinsloo =

Boer general (1838 - 1903)

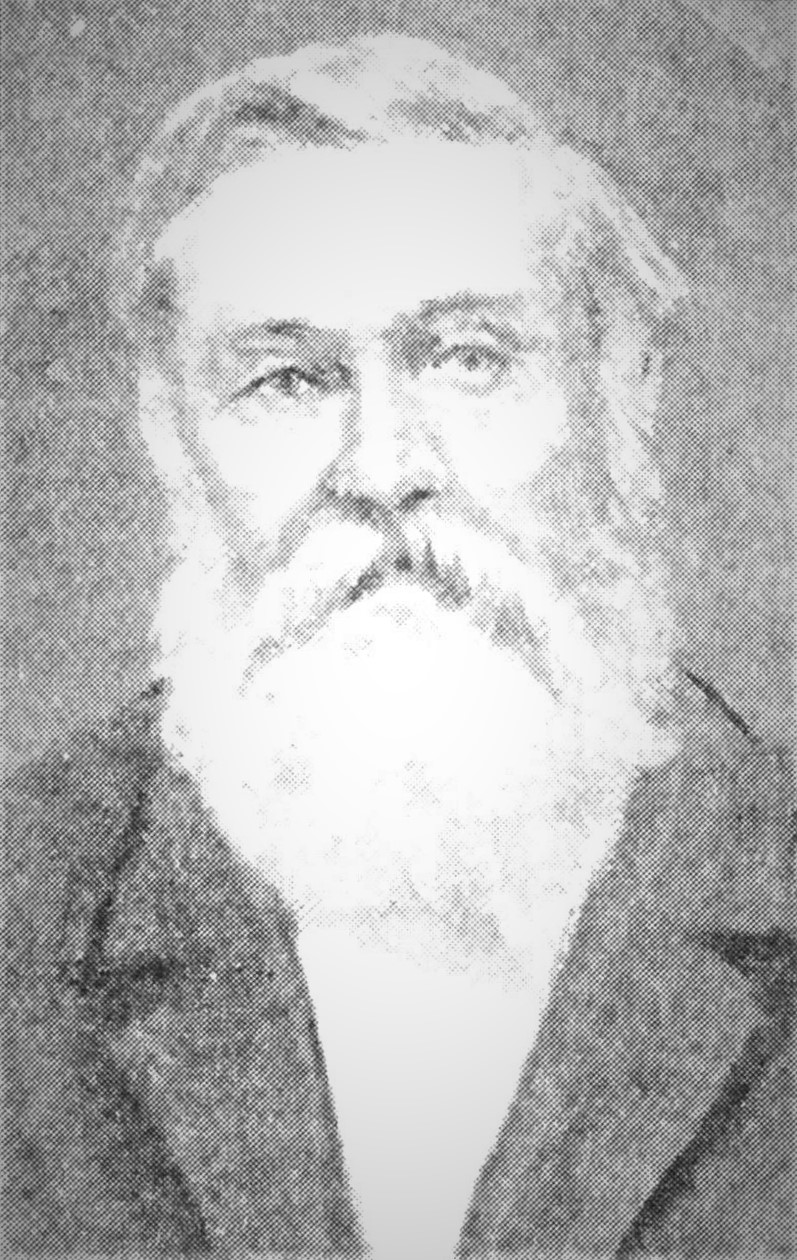

Commander-in-chief of the Orange Free State

Personal details
- Born: 9 October 1838 Graaff-Reinet district, Western District, Eastern Cape, South Africa
- Died: 31 January 1903 (aged 64–65) Winburg, Orange Free State, South Africa
- Spouse: Elsie Petronella Jacoba Botha
- Profession: Farmer, Boer general, politician, judge

Military service
- Allegiance: Orange Free State
- Years of service: 1867–1902
- Commands: Winburg Kommando, Orange Free State commander-in-chief
- Battles/wars: Free State–Basotho Wars, Second Boer War

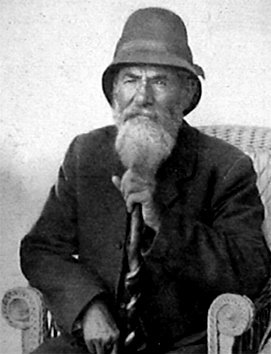
Prinsloo in old age.

Marthinus Prinsloo (1838 - 1903) was an Orange Free State Boer farmer, politician and general in the Second Boer War (1899-1902). He was born of Nicolaas Frans Prinsloo (1813 - 1890) and Isabella Johanna Petronella Rautenbach (1819-around 1908) in the district of Graaff-Reinet, South Africa who migrated to the Orange Free State where they lived in Bloemfontein, Waterval and Bethlehem. Marthinus Prinsloo was the eldest brother of Orange Free State assistant chief commander Antonie Michael Prinsloo (1862 - 1931).

== Early career ==
In August 1867 Prinsloo was elected field cornet (Afrikaans: veldkornet) in the Winburg Commando because of his strong showing in the Free State–Basotho Wars. As a reward for his war time performance, he was also given the Leeuwspruit farm in the Ladybrand district. He married Elsie Petronella Jacoba Botha (1839-1903) who would give him five sons and eight daughters. In 1876 Prinsloo was elected a Member of the Volksraad (House of Assembly) of the Orange Free State in Bloemfontein for Koranaberg and served on several committees, establishing a reputation as an eloquent speaker. He returned to his family farm of Waterval and was elected in 1883 to the Volksraad representing Taaiboschspruit (Winburg). He continued commander of the Winburg Commando and was a justice of the peace. In 1889 he retired from public life, bought the Vredepoort farm near Kwestiefontein (Bloemfontein) and turned wealthy.

== Second Boer War ==
=== Attack of the Colony of Natal ===
After the call to arms in the Orange Free State on 2 October 1899 the commandos of the Boer towns of Bethlehem, Harrismith, Heilbron, Kroonstad, Vrede, and Winburg chose Prinsloo as their Commandant-General to lead the army of the Orange Free State into Natal. He partook of the siege of Ladysmith (2 November 1899 – 28 February 1900) and fought several battles.

Prinsloo and general Schalk Burger were later criticised for their lack of direction when the Boers attacked the strongholds of Caesar's Camp and Wagon Hill at Platrand massif just south of Ladysmith on 6 January 1900. Following the Battle of Spion Kop on 23–24 January 1900 Prinsloo was in command at the front on the Tugela River. After the relief of Ladysmith on 1 March 1900 he commanded at Van Reenen's Pass. He was then chosen by Orange Free State president Steyn to temporarily command Orange Free State troops in the Brandwater Basin in the east of the Free State.

=== Surrender by Prinsloo ===
Prinsloo and his men guarded the mountain passes of the Drakensberg while generals Christiaan de Wet, Paul Roux and Jonathan Crowther would each retreat with their troops northwards and eastwards. De Wet escaped escorting president Steyn, while the remainder of the army instead failed to defend the pass Slabbert's Nek and gave up Retief's Nek after a fight on 23–24 July 1900. The British surrounded Prinsloo by also blocking the passes of Witnek, Kommandonek, Noupoortsnek (Nauwpoortsnek) and finally the Golden Gate pass to the east on the Little Caledon River, so that Prinsloo felt forced to surrender with his army to general Archibald Hunter on 30 July 1900. Some 4300 of his troops including Prinsloo, Roux and Crowther were taken prisoner of war near Fouriesburg, most of them at Surrender Hill. This was the largest number of Boers captured in the war so far, even more than the 4000 at the surrender of general Piet Cronjé at Paardeberg on 27 February 1900. While most of the prisoners from Prinsloo's army were sent to India, Prinsloo himself was held captive at Simon's Town. After the war he returned to his farm where he died in 1903. Prinsloo's surrender in 1900 was viewed by some of his compatriots as a treasonous act. Christiaan de Wet called it a "a horrible murder of government, country and people" (Afrikaans: ’n gruwelike moord op regering, land en volk).

== Bibliography ==
- Bossenbroek, M.P. and Rosenberg, Yvette (Translator). The Boer War, Seven Stories Press, New York, NY, 2018. ISBN 9781609807474, 1609807472. Pages 144–145, 197, 284–285.
- Breytenbach, J. H. (1969). Die Boere-offensief, Okt. – Nov. 1899 [The Boer Offensive, Oct. – Nov. 1899]. Die Geskiedenis van die Tweede Vryheidsoorlog in Suid-Afrika, 1899–1902 (in Afrikaans). Vol. I. Pretoria: Die Staatsdrukker. OCLC 798106662. Pages 156, 158, 167-169, 172, 174-177, 194, 196, 268-169, 172, 174-177, 194, 196, 268, 270, 285-286, 290-291, 297-298, 300-301, 308, 344, 352-353, 355-356, 358, 362-363, 466-467, 469, and 471.
- Breytenbach, J. H. (1971). Die eerste Britse offensief, Nov. – Des. 1899 [The first British offensive, Nov. – Dec. 1899]. Die Geskiedenis van die Tweede Vryheidsoorlog in Suid-Afrika, 1899–1902 (in Afrikaans). Vol. II. Pretoria: Die Staatsdrukker. Pages 240, 422, 428, 431, 433, 436, photo no. 40.
- Breytenbach, J. H. (1973). Die stryd in Natal, Jan. – Feb. 1900 [The battle in Natal, Jan. – Feb. 1900]. Die Geskiedenis van die Tweede Vryheidsoorlog in Suid-Afrika, 1899–1902 (in Afrikaans). Vol. III. Pretoria: Die Staatsdrukker. ISBN 9780797012394. OCLC 612581136. Pages 9–12, 19, 21, 25, 40, 49, 57-59, 63, 79-84, 92, 97, 108-109, 185, 227, 258, 264-266, 269, 273-274, 277-286, 289, 306-307, 309, 313, 315-316, 323, 333-334, 359-366, 373, 394, 405, 427, 452-453, 538, 556, 572, photos 24 and 29.
- Breytenbach, J. H. (1983). Die Britse Opmars tot in Pretoria [The British advance to Pretoria]. Die Geskiedenis van die Tweede Vryheidsoorlog in Suid-Afrika, 1899–1902 (in Afrikaans). Vol. V. Pretoria: Die Staatsdrukker. ISBN 9780621083606. OCLC 769254652. Pages 116, 499, 505-506.
- Breytenbach, J. H. (1996). Die beleg van Mafeking tot met die Slag van Bergendal [The siege of Mafeking up to the Battle of Bergendal]. Die Geskiedenis van die Tweede Vryheidsoorlog in Suid-Afrika, 1899–1902 (in Afrikaans). Vol. VI. Pretoria: Die Staatsdrukker. ISBN 9780797033214. OCLC 813492747. Pages 65–66, 74, 78, 88, 123, 210, 214.
- Hall, Darrell and Pretorius, Fransjohan, The Hall handbook of the Anglo-Boer War, 1899-1902, University of Natal Press, Pietermaritzburg, 1999. ISBN 0-86980-943-1. Pages 18, 28, 135, 149.
- Pakenham, Thomas
  - The Boer War, George Weidenfeld & Nicolson, London, 1979. Abacus, 1992. ISBN 0 349 10466 2. Pages 170, 174, 192–193, 195, 197, 199, 443–445, 454.
  - The Scramble for Africa, 1876-1912, Random House, New York, 1991. ISBN 0-349-10449-2. (General reference with Chapter 31. Milner's War, pages 557-582 on the Boer War 1899-1902.)
- van Rensburg A (1976). "Prinsloo, Marthinus". In De Kock WJ (ed.). Dictionary of South African Biography Vol I (2nd ed.). Cape Town: Tafelberg-Uitgewers. pp. 660–661. ISBN 0624008568. OCLC 1063845175.

== Gallery ==
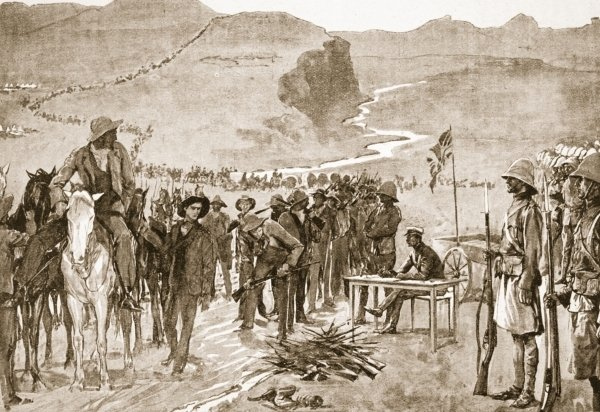
The massive surrender of Prinsloo's Boer forces in Brandwater basin, 1900. Unknown artist. From Archibald Forbes et al.: Battles of the Nineteenth Century, Vol. 7, around 1902.

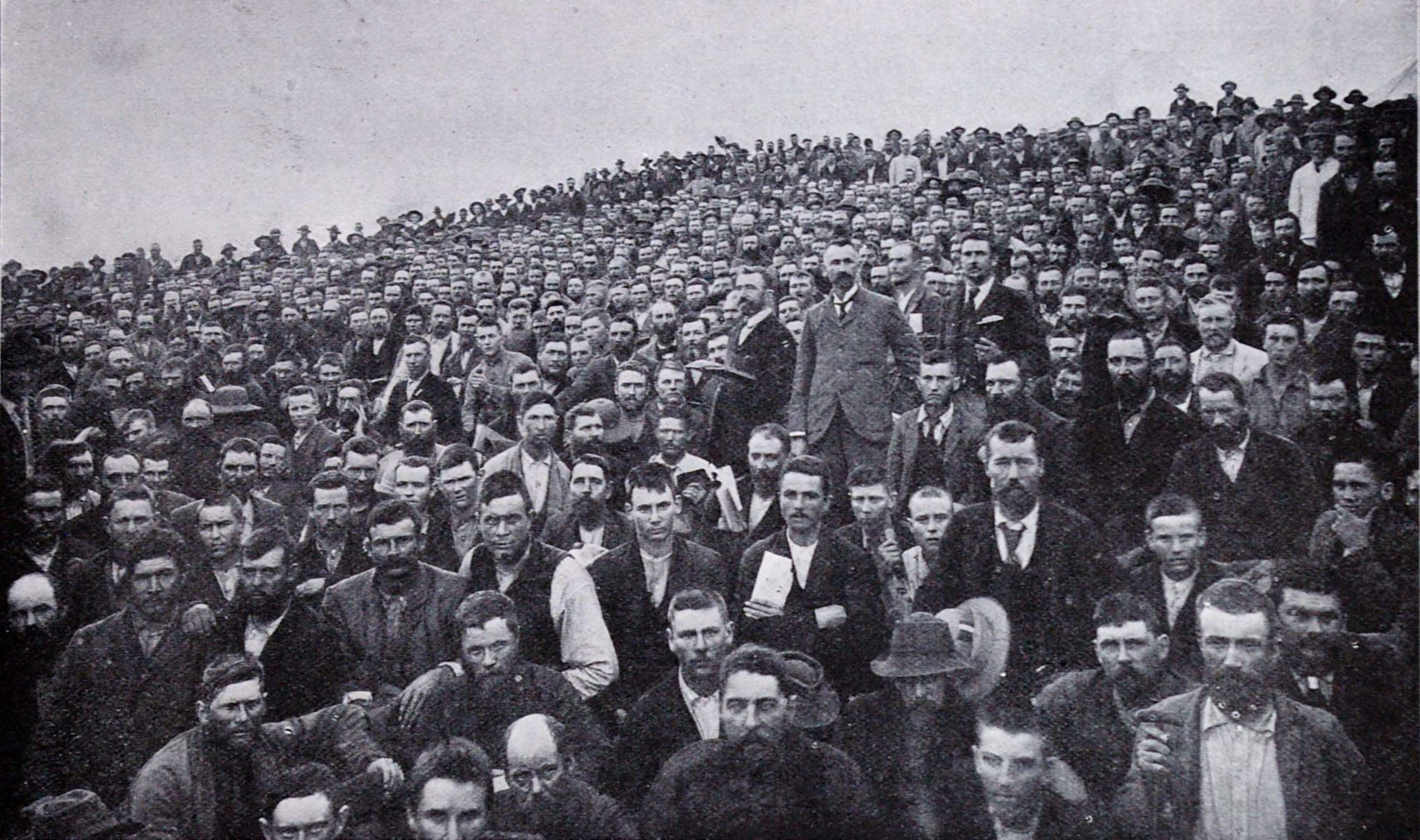
Boer prisoners at Ceylon, mainly taken at Surrender Hill in 1900. Photograph around 1901.

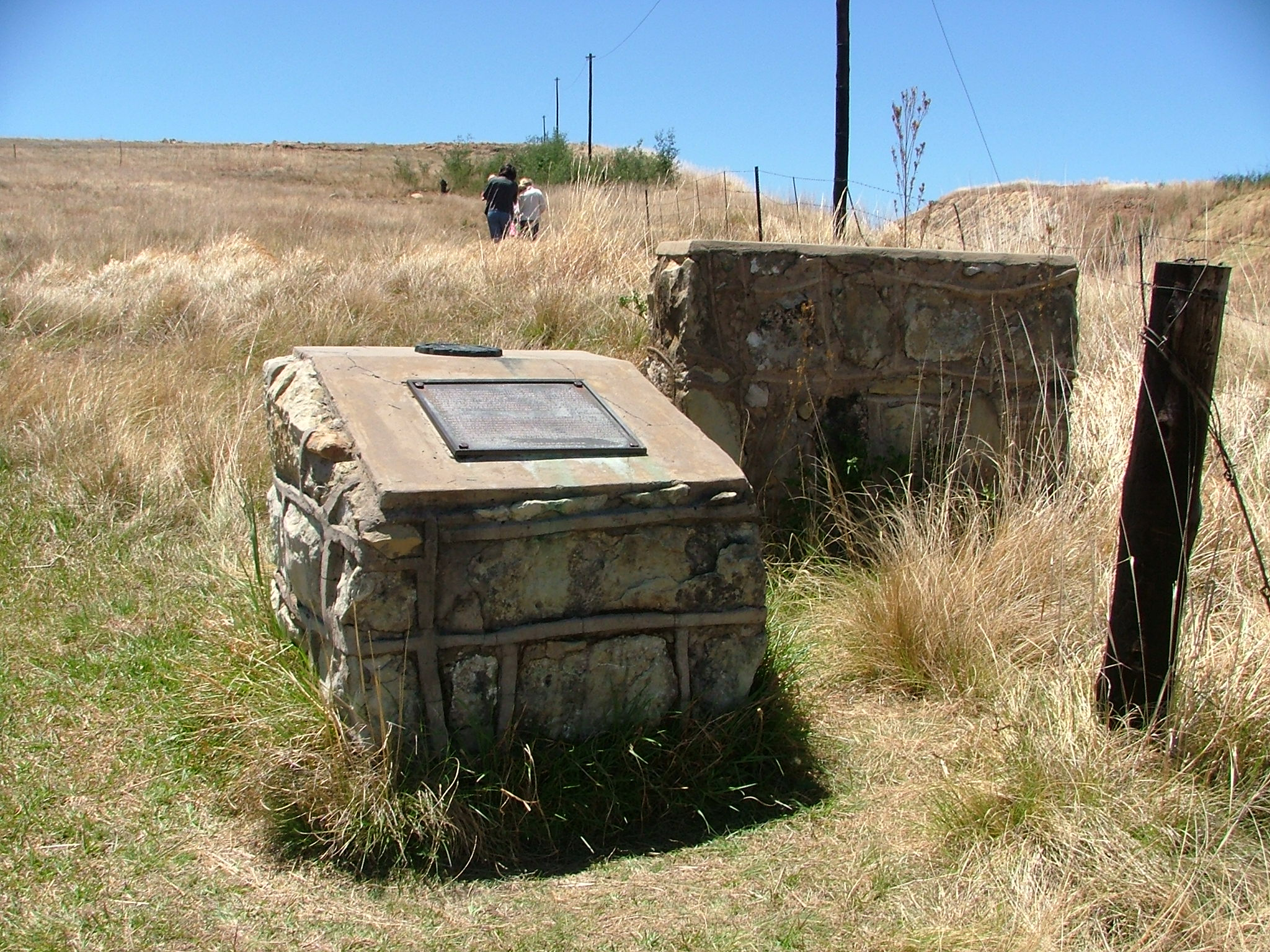
1986 Surrender Hill monument, beside the Clarens-Fouriesburg road in the eastern Orange Free State, South Africa. Photograph 2011.

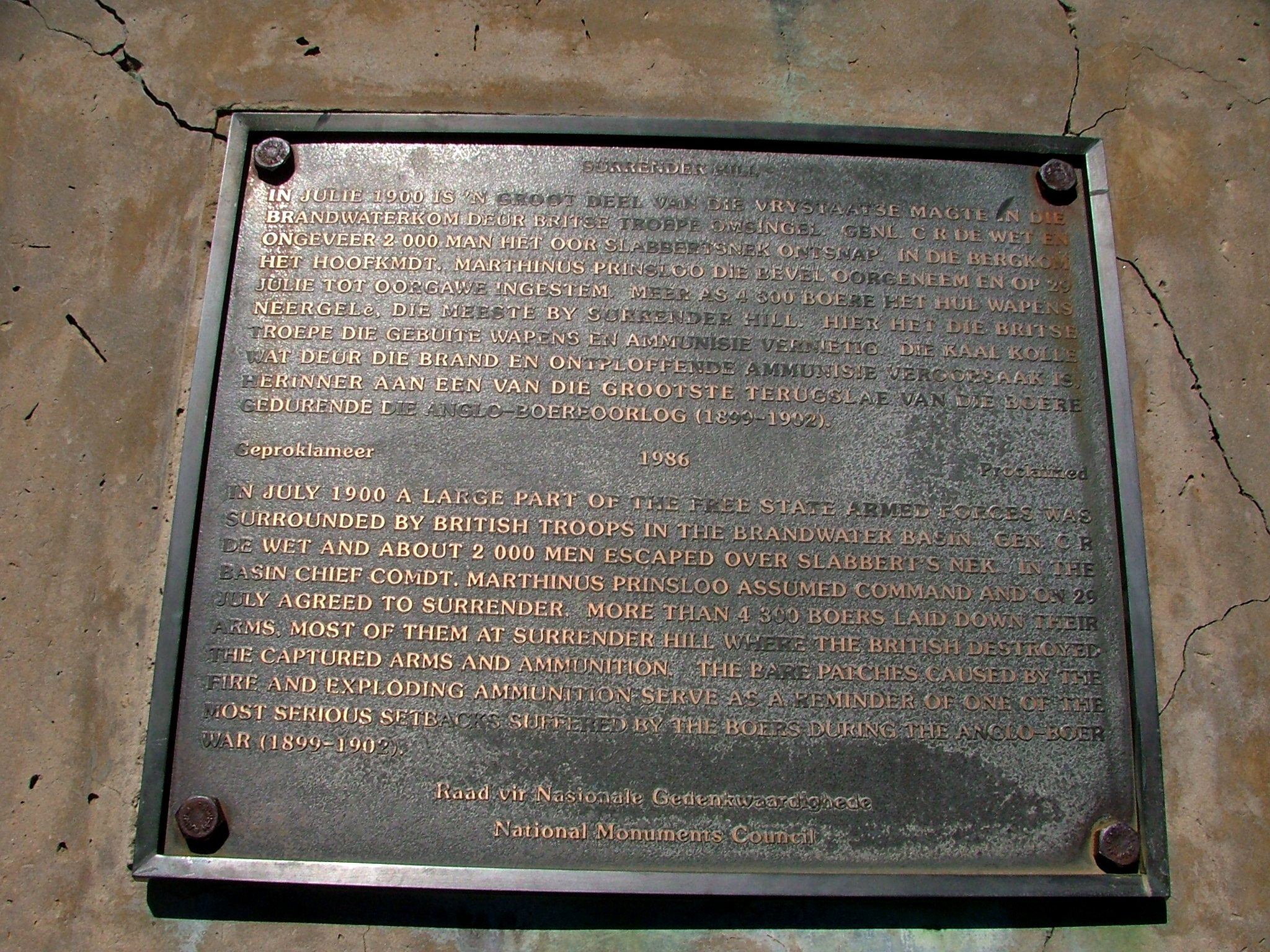
Plaque on the 1986 Surrender Hill monument. Photograph 2011.
