= Paul Roux =

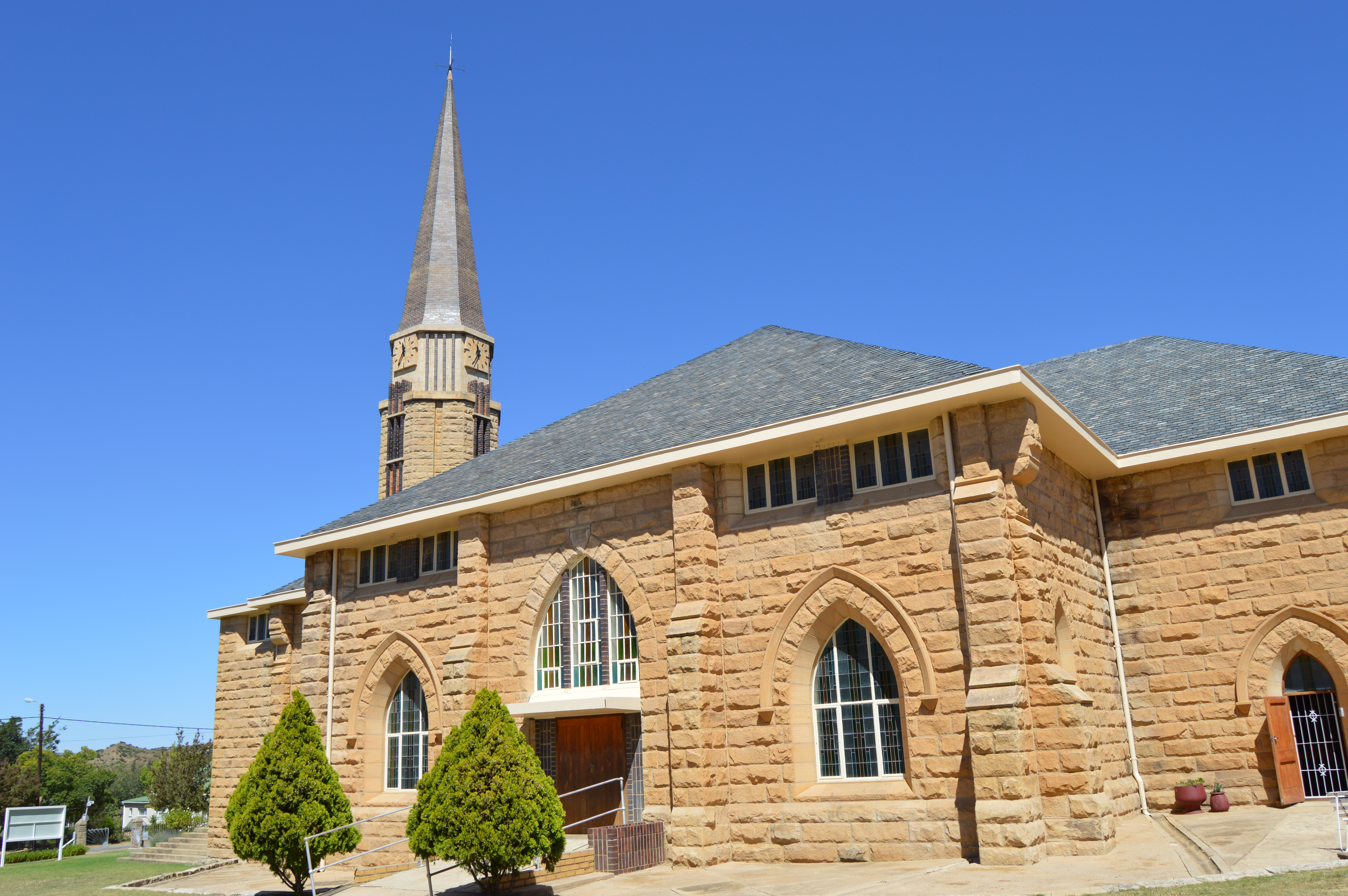
- First church building in Paul Roux

- Location within Free State (South African province) Location within South Africa
- Coordinates: 28°18′S 27°57′E
- Country: South Africa
- Province: Free State
- District: Thabo Mofutsanyane
- Municipality: Dihlabeng
- Named for: Paul Hendrik Roux (1862-1911)

Area
  - Total: 5.32 km^{2} (2.05 sq mi)

Population (2011)
  - Total: 437
  - Density: 82.1/km^{2} (213/sq mi)

Racial makeup (2011)
  - White: 81.2%
  - Black African: 14.2%
  - Indian/Asian: 2.3%
  - Coloured: 0.5%
  - Other: 1.8%

First languages (2011)
  - Afrikaans: 81.2%
  - Sotho: 8.2%
  - English: 7.7%
  - Other: 2.9%
- Time zone: UTC+2 (SAST)
- Postal code (street): 9800
- PO box: 9800
- Area code: 058

Paul Roux is a small town in the Free State province of South Africa. Basotho call the place "Fateng Tse Ntsho" (place of dark trees). It is situated on the N5 highway west of Bethlehem. It was named after a well-known Dutch Reformed Church leader and Boer general, Reverend Paul Hendrik Roux (1862–1911).

== History ==
Paul Roux was established as a post coach station between Winburg and Harrismith. Where the current bowling club stands, there used to be an inn, owned by Mr John Hiscock – a local businessman, at the location of the current bowling club where horses would be changed. The land was purchased from Mr De Jongh and the village was officially proclaimed on 9 May 1909. Two names were proposed for the village – Paul Roux and Du Plessis Ville. To decide on the final name, villagers engraved letters 'PR' on one side of a flat stone and 'Dup' on the other side. The stone was thrown into the air and the village was to be named according to whichever initials appeared facing upwards when it landed.

A public auction was held to sell plots in Paul Roux for a shilling a piece in 1910. Various homesteads were then erected but there was no official church and services would be held on the banks of the Sand River under the shade of willow trees. At some point, church services were held on the veranda of the National Bank building – which is now a private dwelling. A church was finally built in May 1914 where the cornerstone was laid by Reverend C.P. Theron. Construction briefly came to a halt during the Maritz rebellion of 1914 and it was finally completed in October 1915. The church inauguration took place on 10 February 1917.

The first school in Paul Roux was established on 8 October 1912 with only 52 pupils. Its first principal was Mr H.J.J. van Rensburg.

Former state president P. W. Botha was born in Paul Roux on 12 January 1916 on the Telegraaf farm. He attended school in Paul Roux before moving to Bethlehem where he matriculated.

== Tourism ==
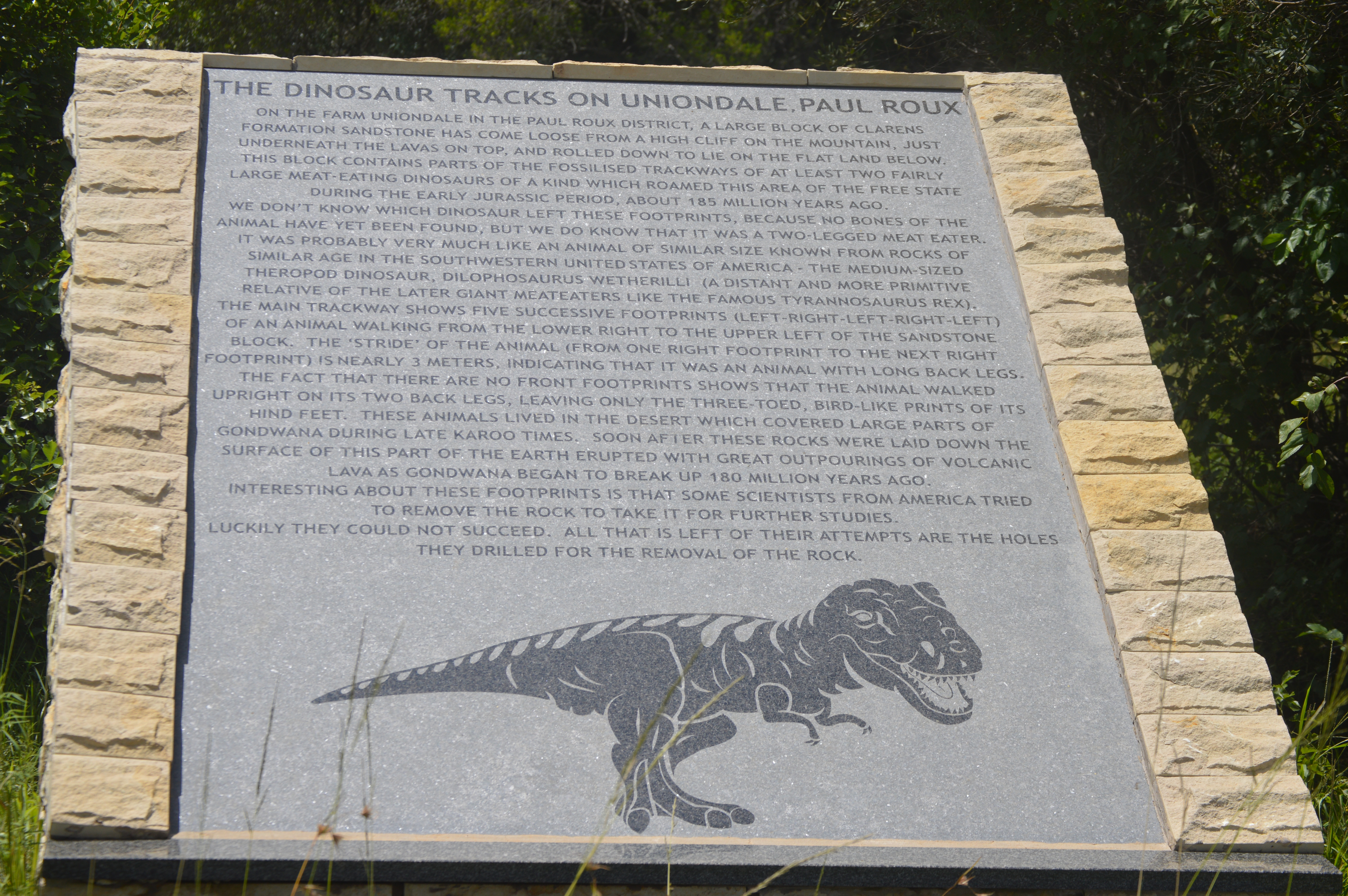
Information plaque of the dinosaur footprint at Uniondale Farm in Paul Roux

Witkop Game Ranch is situated at Witkop just outside Paul Roux. The ranch has about 21 types of game including hippos, cheetahs and buffalos. The Ranch offers hunting opportunities in the form of regular safaris with either rifle or bow.

There is a two-day walking trail which traverses a variety of terrains including mountain tops, sandstone cliffs, kloofs and valleys. There are several ladders and bridges to cross along the way and the paths have been cut back to enable ease of walking. The route follows large trees and rock formations. The terrain has rich historical and archaeological heritage with San rock art and other historical places.

There is a dinosaur footprint at Uniondale Farm on a large block of sandstone containing fossilised tracks of two large dinosaurs which roamed the Free State during the Jurassic period. The main track shows five successive footprints of an animal with a gait nearly 3 metres in length.

On 10 October 2015, the community had their first '’’Holhoek'’ 40 km mountain bike race and 10 km fun run. This was aimed at raising funds to rehabilitate the Rooidam and to promote tourism.
