= Rosendal, Free State =

Rosendal
- Location within Free State (South African province) Location within South Africa
- Coordinates: 28°30′S 27°55′E
- Country: South Africa
- Province: Free State
- District: Thabo Mofutsanyane
- Municipality: Dihlabeng

Area
  - Total: 8.5 km^{2} (3.3 sq mi)

Population (2011)
  - Total: 4,132
  - Density: 490/km^{2} (1,300/sq mi)

Racial makeup (2011)
  - Black African: 97.1%
  - Coloured: 0.7%
  - Indian/Asian: 0.2%
  - White: 2.0%
  - Other: 0.1%

First languages (2011)
  - Sotho: 94.4%
  - Afrikaans: 3.1%
  - Sign language: 1.1%
  - Other: 1.4%
- Time zone: UTC+2 (SAST)
- Postal code (street): 9720
- PO box: 9720
- Area code: 058

Rosendal is a small farming town and arts colony 45 km north of Ficksburg in the Free State province of South Africa which was founded in 1908. It has become a popular tourist destination, known for spectacular scenery, including the surrounding Witteberg mountains, and is home to a community of artists and small business owners. The town has a number of attractive buildings and restored early-20th-century homes. The quality of architectural design for newly built homes is notable, adding to the town's attractive character. This includes a number of "Tiny Homes" - less than 100 square meters - and which has earned Rosendal a reputation for becoming South Africa's tiny home capital. There are several art galleries, cafes and good restaurants as well as a heritage district of restored buildings in the former downtown. Until recently live theatre was hosted here by well known Afrikaans language actor, Chris Van Niekerk.

There is an active town committee, drawn from residents in both Rosendal and Mautse, and which works on various local initiatives to promote the town, fix infrastructure and improve the lives of all residents. This has earned Rosendal a reputation as a town that works together and where social obligations are observed. This "can-do" spirit is credited with contributing to the town's relaxed and pleasant character as a peaceful and safe community.

The Eastern Free State was first occupied by indigenous San and Khoi people, as evidenced by the many examples of rock art in caves on the farms surrounding Rosendal.

By the early 1800s, a series of highly decentralised Basotho chiefdoms had emerged in the area. Through the twin pressures of the massive Zulu kingdom's expansion from the east, known as the murderous genocidal Difaqane, and the arrival of the Voortrekkers from the south, the various chiefdoms came together under the leadership of King Moshoeshoe. Universally praised as a skilled diplomat and strategist, he was able to wield the disparate chiefdoms and refugee groups escaping the Difaqane into a cohesive nation. There is evidence around Rosendal of sacred places and mountain fortresses used by the BaSotho during this period.

Hunters, adventurers and missionaries from the Cape had already arrived in the area in the 1820s, but Cape farmers only came in large numbers during the Great Trek, from about 1837. As the republic of the Orange Free State expanded various Boer-Basotho wars were fought and the Basotho pushed eastwards across the Caledon river, before a British protectorate, Basotholand, was declared.

The town came into being, like many in rural South Africa, when local farmers petitioned for a Church to be built within reasonable distance. Rosendal is 40 and 43 km from Senekal and Ficksburg, respectively, the distance that could be ridden in a day on horse back. A town was laid out in 1911 and declared a municipality in 1914, built upon a farm donated by a widow, Ms Botha, who chose the name Rosendal, "valley of roses".

A church, a bank, post office, school and hotel were built and a plan laid out for what was intended to be a sizeable settlement. Lacking a railway stop, isolated by the Witteberg mountains to the east and being in an thinly populated area, Rosendal did not fulfil the early promise of becoming a city or large town. Today this accounts for its unique low density character. Visitors will notice a grid pattern of streets with a small number of homes spread out with great distance between them, creating the sensation of being in open countryside even when in the middle of town. From the late 1970s Rosendal entered a period of decline with businesses and services closing and population falling. The closure of the local Afrikaans language school in 1982 had a particularly strong effect on the town's vitality; Rosendal began to acquire some of the character of a "ghost town" with many abandoned or disused homes. This began to reverse from the late 1990s when a small group of writers, artists and adventurers began to call it home.

Today there are roughly 140 people living full-time in what is the historic town area as well as weekend or recreational home owners from Johannesburg, Bloemfontein and internationally. For a place of its size it is diverse and cosmopolitan with residents who have professional careers nationally and abroad. It remains a small Free State farming town in character in which cattle are herded through the streets by cowboys and wild or untethered horses roam the town. It is also a place of farmers, farm workers, artists and weekenders in which arts festivals and music concerts are held.

Apartheid era geography is apparent and Rosendal village is physically separated from Mautse, the township, which is a vibrant community today of nearly 7000 people. Mautse may have had its origins in apartheid planning as the residence of domestic and other workers, some of whom were uprooted from homes in or on the outskirts of Rosendal itself.

Some residents of Mautse came from Lesotho in search of a better life, but most came as a result of the Land Reform Act at the end of Apartheid, when – with intent to counteract slave labour – government brought in minimum wage, which meant white farm owners who once fed and sheltered black labourers to work their fields, could no longer do so.

Historic Mautse, most of which is made up of brick homes and RDP houses, is situated alongside new and growing sections of the settlement, the largest of which is Matatie where most homes are tin shacks. These are not suitable for the harsh climate of cold winters and hot summers. Firewood is a scarce resource and people walk further and further afield to gather winter fuel, as the locals typically chop down scarce trees for firewood without replanting new trees to replace them.

Mautse is a growing community with a high school and primary school, government offices, a stadium, community centre and many small businesses.

Labour shedding by farms in recent years, caused by tight government regulation, has produced farm to town migration, as well as preference by workers to be closer to schools, services and shops. Most farm workers in the area now live in Mautse itself rather than on farms directly.

Apart from farm labour, employment opportunities are limited as the authorities have done little to stimulate economic growth and employment, and the educated ambitious and uneducated desperately depart for South Africa's larger cities in an attempt to pursue careers.

Some Mautse residents use their small plots of land to cultivate fresh produce. Many of Rosendal's–predominately white–residents are highly educated, offering a realm of creative, practical (carpentry sewing etc) business and media skills. Most have the desire to contribute to the challenges faced by Mautse. There is a permaculture farm (Waaipoort) close by.

Rosendal-Mautse is a pleasant and relaxed place to live and people here know each other and get along well.
