= Dihlabeng Local Municipality =

Coordinates: 28°13′46″S 28°18′38″E

Dihlabeng
- Local municipality
- Seal

- Location in the Free State
- Country: South Africa
- Province: Free State
- District: Thabo Mofutsanyana
- Seat: Bethlehem
- Wards: 20

Government
  - Type: Municipal council

Area
  - Total: 4,880 km^{2} (1,880 sq mi)

Population (2022)
  - Total: 130,434
  - Density: 26.7/km^{2} (69.2/sq mi)

Racial makeup (2022)
  - Black African: 88.2%
  - Coloured: 1.3%
  - Indian/Asian: 0.5%
  - White: 9.8%

First languages (2011)
  - Sotho: 77.5%
  - Afrikaans: 11.9%
  - Zulu: 4.8%
  - English: 2.4%
  - Other: 3.4%
- Time zone: UTC+2 (SAST)
- Municipal code: FS192

Dihlabeng Municipality (Sotho: Masepala wa Dihlabeng; Afrikaans: Dihlabeng Munisipaliteit) is a local municipality within the Thabo Mofutsanyana District Municipality, in the Free State province of South Africa. It was established after the first general local government elections on 5 December 2000, which heralded the final phase of local government reform as envisaged in 1994 at the onset of the process of democratisation and the end of apartheid. The seat is Bethlehem.

== Geography ==
The Dihlabeng Local Municipality is situated within the boundaries of the Thabo Mofutsanyana District Municipality in the Eastern Free State. The geographical area is 7550.4910 km^{2}. The Municipality consists of the towns Bethlehem (incl. Bohlokong & Bakenpark), Clarens (incl. Kgubetswana), Fouriesburg (incl. Mashaeng), Paul Roux (incl. Fateng-Tse-Ntsho) and Rosendal (incl. Mautse).

Bethlehem is situated approximately 240 km north-east of Bloemfontein, 140 km east of Kroonstad and 90 km west of Harrismith. The town is strategically situated in the heart of the picturesque north-eastern Free State and originally developed as a service centre. Growth is stimulated by the strategic location of the area that serves as a central regional centre, situated adjacent to the N5 between Bloemfontein and Durban.

The scenic town of Clarens, often referred to the “Switzerland” of South Africa is situated ± 34 km south-east of Bethlehem. Clarens is a mere 20 km from the Golden Gate Highlands National Park.

Fouriesburg is situated on the R26 route and in close proximity of Lesotho. The town has the predominant function of a small service centre and is increasingly being supported by the tourism industry. 67% of the population resides in urban areas and 33% in surrounding rural areas.

Paul Roux is situated 35 km west of Bethlehem, on the N5. The area is mainly focused on agricultural significance.

Rosendal is located at the foot of the Witteberg mountain range on the R70.

== Economy ==
The economic activities within the Municipality are dominated by farming (29.4%) and private business (17.2%). At ± 15% and 11% respectively, social services and trade operations are also relatively high economic activities.

Of a total farmland area of ± 3 000 ha in the Eastern Free State, 34% thereof is located within the Dihlabeng area – a factor that confirms the Agricultural comparative advantage that the sub region has in the Free State Province. The normal industrial incentives, with specific reference to affordable purchase prices, endorsed by Dihlabeng Local Council, ensure growth in the epithelium industrial area. The significance of the Lesotho Highlands Water and the Bethlehem Hydro Electricity projects are also relevant in this regard. Upmarket Residential, Business and Tourism development of a large scale is currently taking place in the region.

The agricultural sector of the Dihlabeng region is extremely prominent.

Considering small scale processing industries and intensive farming activities will result in future economic growth in the Agriculture sector. Effective productive grazing and small scale farming programmes on the existing and identified land for commonage have future growth potential. As part of Government’s Land Reform Programme, emerging farmers are trained and supported to ensure productive farming practices, which ensures economic growth in Dihlabeng..

== Corruption ==
In September 2024, the former municipal manager of the Dihlabeng Local Municipality, together with the former director of the municipal department of public works, infrastructure and human settlements, were arrested for fraud by the Hawks Serious Corruption Investigation team. The fraud related to the installation of diesel generators without following due processes, costing the municipality R611,000.

== Main places ==
The 2001 census divided the municipality into the following main places:

Place	Code	Area (km^{2})	Population	Most spoken language
Bethlehem	41301	17.87	11,815	Afrikaans
Bohlokong	41302	11.28	54,882	Sotho
Clarens	41303	2.58	4,084	Sotho
Fateng-Tse-Ntsho	41305	0.93	5,231	Sotho
Fouriesburg	41306	15.33	2,107	Sotho
Masjaing	41307	1.37	8,815	Sotho
Mautse	41308	0.45	2,447	Sotho
Paul Roux	41309	13.72	484	Afrikaans
Rosendal	41310	9.12	176	Afrikaans
Vaalbank	41311	10.54	27	Sotho
Remainder of the municipality	41304	4,655.83	38,834	Sotho

== Politics ==
The municipal council consists of thirty-eight members elected by mixed-member proportional representation. Nineteen councillors are elected by first-past-the-post voting in nineteen wards, while the remaining nineteen are chosen from party lists so that the total number of party representatives is proportional to the number of votes received.

The ANC lost its majority in the 2026 South African municipal elections, but remained the largest party, with 18 seats.

The following table shows the results of the 2026 election.

Party	Ward			List			Total seats
Party	Votes	%	Seats	Votes	%	Seats	Total seats
African National Congress	18,241	44.14	16	18,769	45.84	2	18
Democratic Alliance	11,364	27.50	3	12,645	30.88	9	12
Freedom Front Plus	2,025	4.90	0	2,455	6.00	2	2
Economic Freedom Fighters	1,994	4.82	0	2,279	5.57	2	2
Independent candidates	2,542	6.15	0				0
ActionSA	938	2.27	0	1,096	2.68	1	1
Patriotic Alliance	768	1.86	0	790	1.93	1	1
South African Communist Party	605	1.46	0	625	1.53	1	1
Batho Movement	388	0.94	0	407	0.99	1	1
11 other parties	2,465	5.96	0	1,879	4.59	0	0
Total	41,330	100.00	19	40,945	100.00	19	38
Valid votes	41,330	98.19		40,945	97.80		
Invalid/blank votes	763	1.81		921	2.20		
Total votes	42,093	100.00		41,866	100.00		
Registered voters/turnout	77,595	54.25		77,595	53.95		
