= Archibald Hunter =

British Army general (1856–1936)

General Sir Archibald Hunter GCB GCVO DSO TD
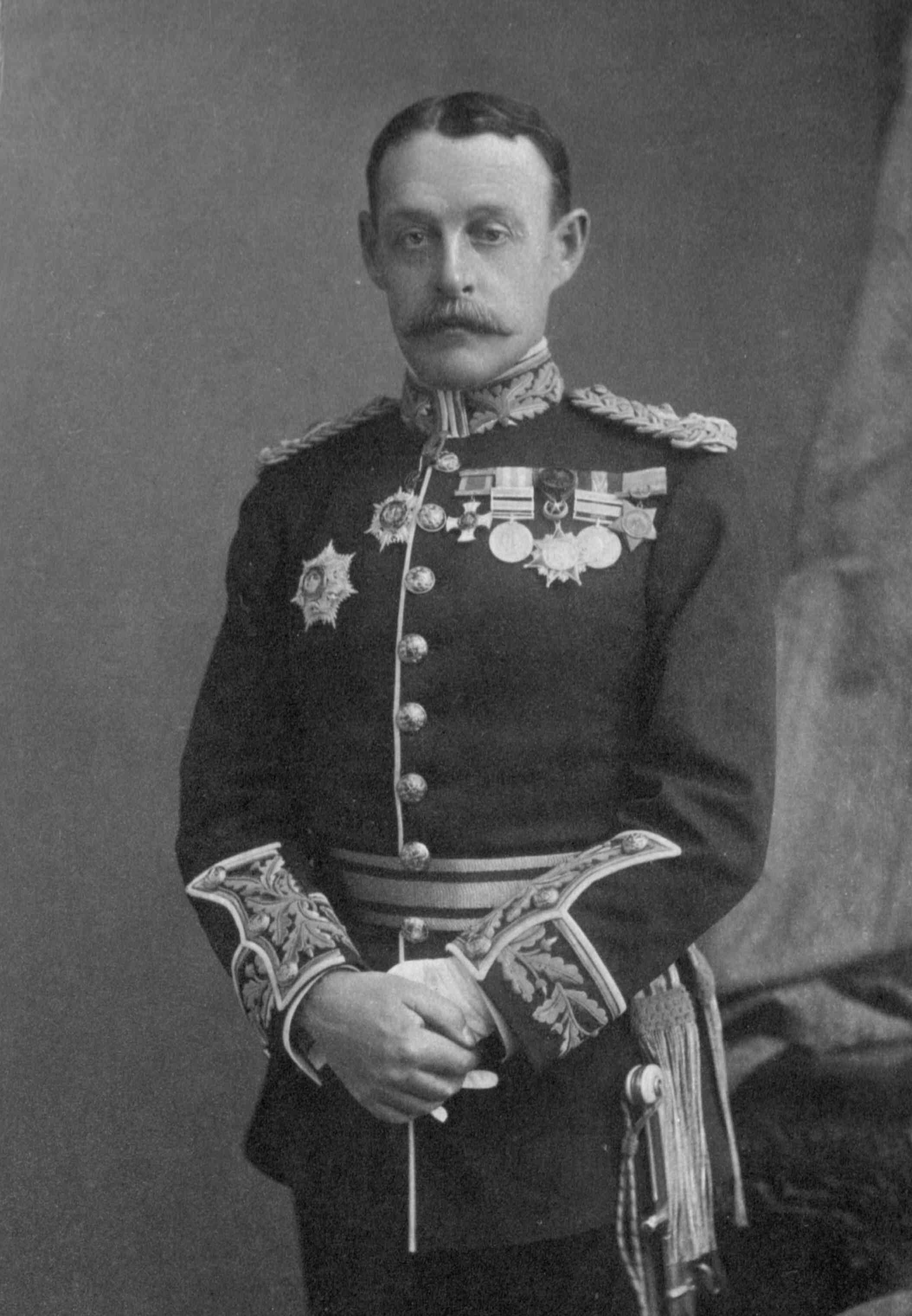
- Born: 6 September 1856
- Died: 28 June 1936 (aged 79)
- Military career
- Allegiance: United Kingdom
- Branch: British Army
- Service years: 1875–1918
- Rank: General
- Commands: Aldershot Command; 3rd Army; 13th (Western) Division; Gibraltar; Southern Army, India; Bombay Command; Scottish District; 10th Division
- Conflicts: Mahdist War; Second Boer War; First World War
- Awards: Knight Grand Cross of the Order of the Bath; Knight Grand Cross of the Royal Victorian Order; Distinguished Service Order; Mentioned in Despatches; Territorial Decoration; Legion of Honour (France)

General Sir Archibald Hunter, GCB, GCVO, DSO, TD (6 September 1856 – 28 June 1936) was a senior officer in the British Army who distinguished himself during the Boer War. He was Governor of Omdurman, in Sudan, and later of Gibraltar.

== Early life ==
Archibald Hunter, born a twin, was the son of an Archibald Hunter (1805–1868), a London businessman and Mary Jane Graham (1833–1905). Having chosen not to follow his father's business routes, Hunter began military education in Glasgow, and then at the Royal Military College Sandhurst. In 1875, the nineteen-year-old sub lieutenant joined the 4th (King's Own Royal) Regiment.

== Mahdi Uprising ==
Hunter (third from left, seated) in c. 1885

Between 1884 and 1885, Hunter joined the Gordon Relief Expedition, which sought to rescue Major General Charles George Gordon from his Mahdi captives. The expedition was, however, too late; Gordon had been killed two days before their arrival. He later saw action at the Battle of Toski in August 1889 during the Mahdist War.

He was appointed Governor of Dongola Province in the Sudan and Commandant of the Frontier Field Force in 1895. In 1896, he joined the Anglo-Egyptian Nile Expeditionary Force under Lord Kitchener, the Sirdar (commander of the Egyptian Army), Hunter commanding the Egyptian Army Division during the reconquest of the Sudan, which culminated in the Battle of Omdurman in September 1898. He was made Governor of Omdurman in Sudan in 1899, and was appointed in command of the Quetta district in India later on 14 May 1899.

== Second Boer War ==
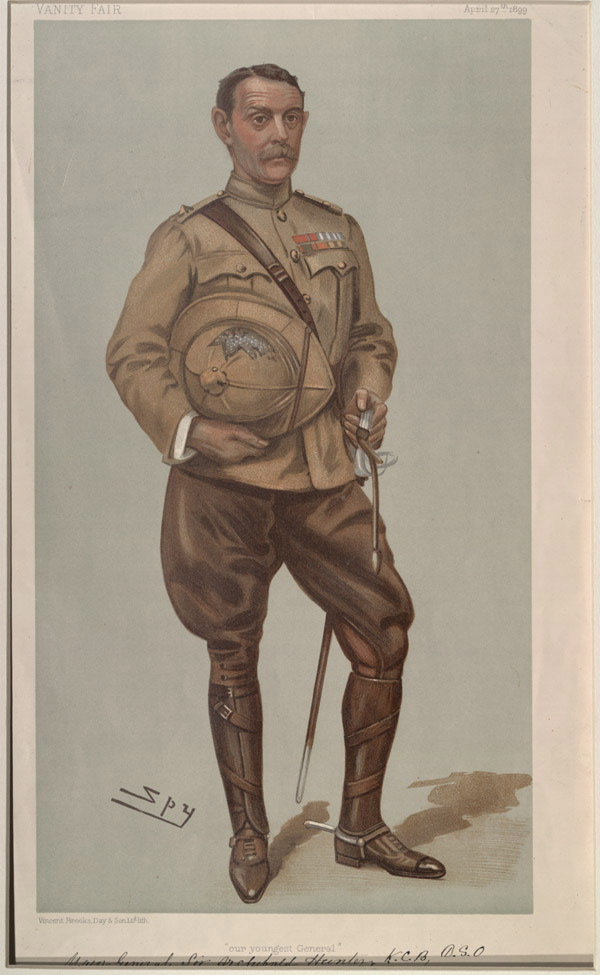
Hunter caricatured by Spy for Vanity Fair, 1899

At the outbreak of the Second Boer War in October 1899, Major General Hunter (although actually Chief of Staff to General Sir Redvers Buller's 1st Army Corps from 21 September 1899) was on the staff of Sir George White's Natal Field Force during the Battle of Ladysmith in Natal and the subsequent 118-day siege. On 8 December he successfully led a small raid against one of the Boers' Creusot "Long Tom" guns and a howitzer which they disabled with cotton charges.

The town was relieved on 1 March 1900 and Hunter was promoted to lieutenant general on 6 March and posted as General Officer Commanding 10th Division.

The 10th Division were sent to join Lord Roberts' army on the western front of South Africa which was now camped at the captured Orange Free State capital Bloemfontein. Hunter led them in the march on Pretoria, crossing into the Transvaal Republic on 3 May. Once Pretoria was captured Robert's army had to deal with Guerrilla warfare. During this period, Hunter was sent south again as overall commander of five columns that converged on the Free State army camped at Brandwater Basin, there forcing the surrender of 4,314 Boers led by Marthinus Prinsloo. It was the largest number of Boers captured in the war so far and cost very little in British casualties; only 33 dead and 242 wounded.

== Later life ==
In early 1901 he was asked by King Edward VII to take part in a special diplomatic mission to announce the King's accession to the governments of Denmark, Sweden and Norway, Russia, Germany, and Saxony.

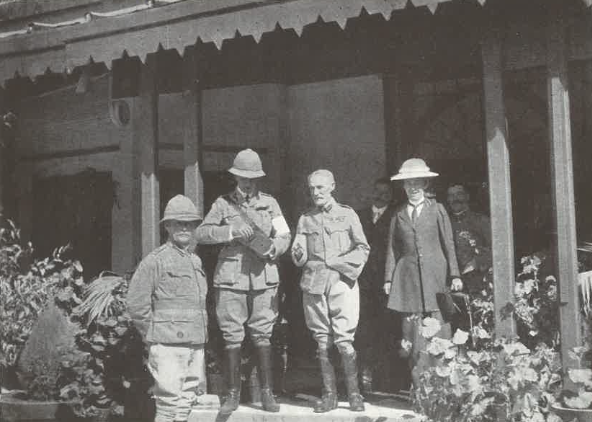
Archibald Hunter, John Cowans, Horace Smith-Dorrien and Mrs Adam outside Smith-Dorrien's bungalow in Quetta, India, c. 1907

Hunter became General Officer Commanding Scottish District in May 1901, Commander-in-Chief Bombay Command in 1903 (renamed Western Army Corps in 1905) and, promoted to general in December 1905, General Officer Commanding Southern Army in India from 1907.

From 1910 until 1913 he was Governor of Gibraltar, after which he was appointed colonel of the King's Own (Royal Lancaster Regiment), a position he held from March 1913, taking over from General Sir William Gordon Cameron, until 1926.

In August 1914 Hunter was living in Scotland as a half-pay officer. Writing to his former commander Lord Horatio Kitchener he stated "I live in hopes of your giving me a command". Too old for a field command in the First World War, he was posted to Aldershot, first in the key role of GOC Aldershot Training Centre and then as GOC Aldershot Command. He retired in 1918.

Hunter was elected at the 1918 general election as a Coalition Conservative Member of Parliament (MP) for Lancaster, but stood down at the 1922 general election.

== Honours and awards ==
Hunter was an honorary freeman of the borough of Lancaster.

Hunter received the honorary Doctor of Laws (LL.D) from the University of Glasgow in June 1901.

He received the following decorations:

- GCB : Knight Grand Cross of the Order of the Bath
- GCVO: Knight Grand Cross of the Royal Victorian Order
- DSO : Distinguished Service Order

== Family ==
Archibald Hunter married, in 1910, Mary, Dowager Baroness Inverclyde (1866–1924), widow of George Burns, 2nd Baron Inverclyde (1861–1905) and daughter of Hickson Fergusson.

== Legacy ==
His archive of over one hundred letters and documents was recently sold. A highlight of the £15,000 collection included twenty six autographed letters from Kitchener.

Military offices
Preceded by Edward Chapman	GOC Scottish District; 1901–1903	Succeeded by Charles Tucker
Preceded by Sir Robert Low	C-in-C, Bombay Command; 1903–1907	Succeeded by Post disbanded
Preceded by New post	GOC-in-C, Southern Army, India; 1907–1908	Succeeded by Sir Edmund Barrow
Government offices
Preceded by Sir Frederick Forestier-Walker	Governor of Gibraltar; 1910–1913	Succeeded by Sir Herbert Miles
Military offices
Preceded by Sir Alexander Hamilton-Gordon	GOC-in-C Aldershot Command; 1916–1917	Succeeded by Sir Archibald Murray
Preceded by William Gordon Cameron	Colonel of the King's Own (Royal Lancaster Regiment); 1913–1926	Succeeded by Oswald Cuthbert Borrett
Parliament of the United Kingdom
Preceded by Norval Watson Helme	Member of Parliament for Lancaster; 1918 – 1922	Succeeded by John Edward Singleton
