= Fouriesburg =

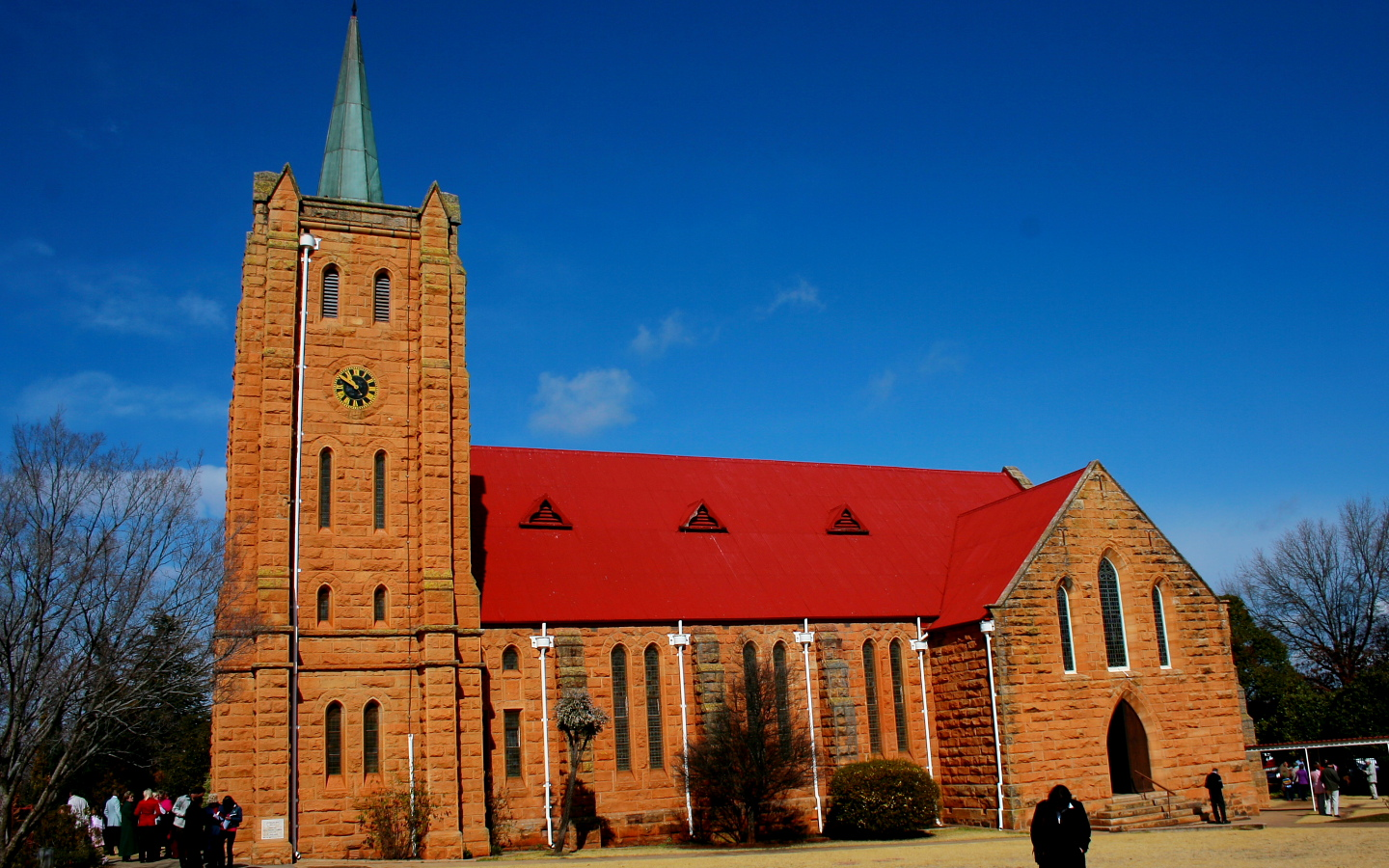
- Dutch Reformed Church, Fouriesburg

- Location within Free State (South African province) Location within South Africa
- Coordinates: 28°37′21.9″S 28°12′39.22″E
- Country: South Africa
- Province: Free State
- District: Thabo Mofutsanyane
- Municipality: Dihlabeng
- Established: 1892

Area
  - Total: 12.8 km^{2} (4.9 sq mi)
- Elevation: 1,745 m (5,725 ft)

Population (2011)
  - Total: 19,425
  - Density: 1,520/km^{2} (3,930/sq mi)

Racial makeup (2011)
  - Black African: 96.5%
  - Coloured: 0.3%
  - Indian/Asian: 0.6%
  - White: 2.5%
  - Other: 0.2%

First languages (2011)
  - Sotho: 90.7%
  - Afrikaans: 3.2%
  - English: 2.0%
  - Sign language: 1.6%
  - Other: 2.6%
- Time zone: UTC+2 (SAST)
- Postal code (street): 9725
- PO box: 9725
- Area code: 058

Fouriesburg is a small town situated at the junction of the R711 and R26 routes in the eastern Free State, South Africa. It is near the Maluti Mountains and only 10 km from Caledon's Poort border post, which gives access to Lesotho.

== History ==
During the late nineteenth century, this land was donated to the Orange Free State by a local farmer of Huguenot descent, Christoffel Fourie, for use as a temporary capital during the Second Boer War. It was the site of several engagements during the Boer War, and by 1902 the original settlement had been almost completely destroyed.

== Vicinity ==
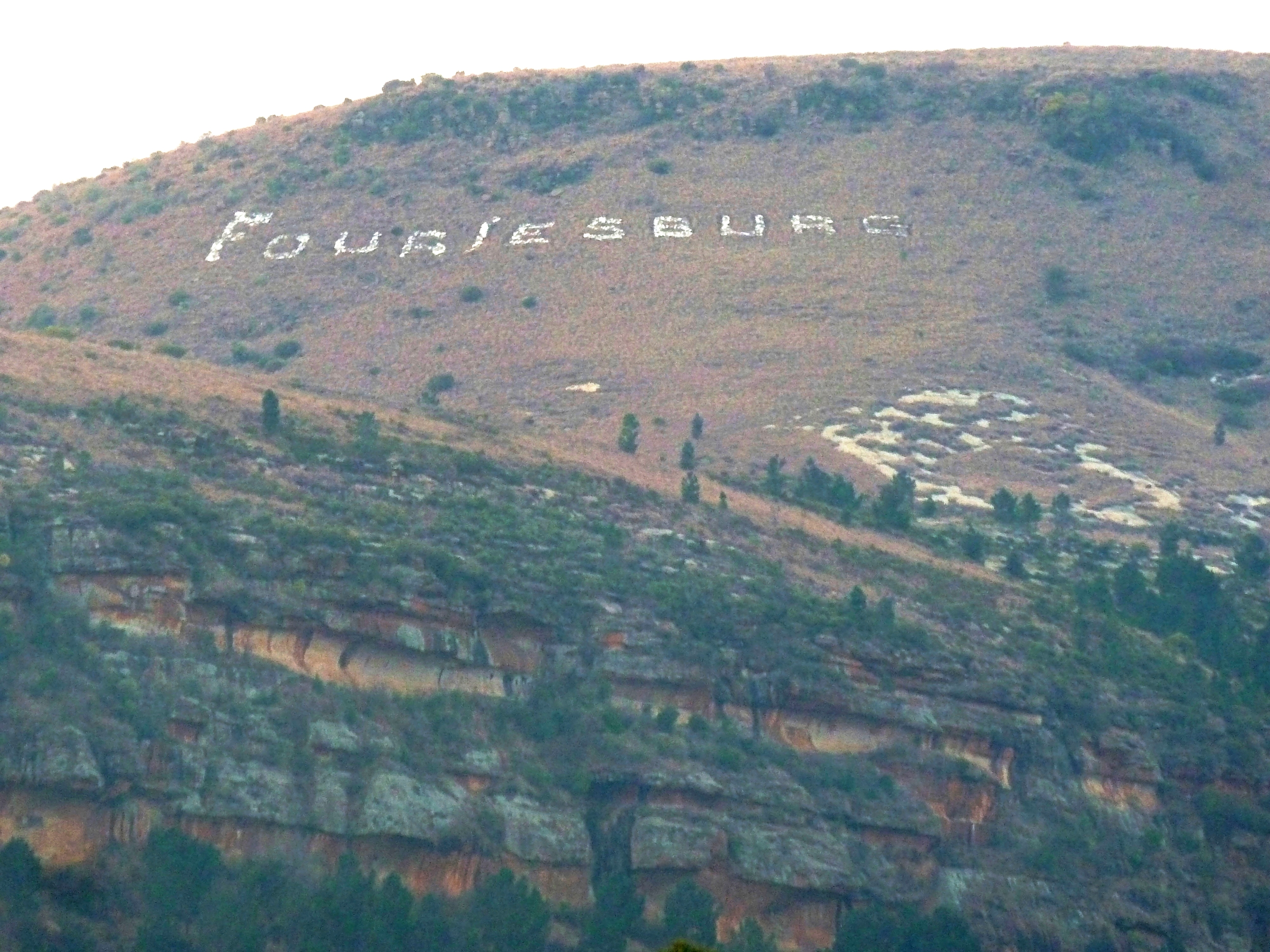
The town name on Ventersberg which flanks Meiringskloof Nature Park

A small private resort, Meiringskloof Nature Park, is located in a valley just northeast of town. Fouriesburg is about half an hour's drive from Clarens, a popular tourist destination, and a 45-minute drive from Golden Gate Highlands National Park. It is about fifty kilometres south-east of Bethlehem, and some fifty-three from Ficksburg.

Fouriesburg ranked first during South Africa's 2013 Kwela Town of the Year competition.

== Union house ==
Originally built in the 1870s, Union House was destroyed by fire during the Second Boer War. President Brand of the Free State planted two oak trees in the front yard to represent the union of Afrikaans and English residents in observance of the peace between the Boer and British. This farm hosted the Free State celebration of the Union of South Africa in 1910.
