= R719 (South Africa) =

Regional route in South Africa

Regional route R719

Route information
- Length: 101 km (63 mi)

Major junctions
- South end: R710 at Bultfontein
- R34 at Wesselsbron; R505 at Wesselsbron
- North end: R30 near Bothaville

Location
- Country: South Africa

Highway system
- Numbered routes of South Africa
← R717	→ R720

The R719 is a regional route in South Africa.

== Route ==
Its north-eastern terminus is the R30, 25 km south of Bothaville and 35 km north of Odendaalsrus. It heads south-west to the town of Wesselsbron. At Wesselsbron, it meets the south-eastern terminus of the R505 and crosses the R34. It continues south-west, ending at the R710 at Bultfontein.
