= R30 (South Africa) =

Road in South Africa

Provincial route R30

Route information
- Maintained by SANRAL, FSDPRT and NWDPWRT
- Length: 429 km (267 mi)

Major junctions
- North end: R24 near Rustenburg
- R53 in Ventersdorp; N14 near Ventersdorp; N12 in Klerksdorp; R76 near Orkney; R59 in Bothaville; R34 in Odendaalsrus; R73 in Welkom
- South end: N1 near Bloemfontein

Location
- Country: South Africa
- Major cities: Rustenburg; Klerksdorp; Welkom; Bloemfontein
- Towns: Ventersdorp; Orkney; Bothaville; Odendaalsrus; Theunissen; Brandfort

Highway system
- Numbered routes of South Africa
← R29	→ R31

The R30 is a provincial route in South Africa that connects Bloemfontein with Rustenburg via Brandfort, Welkom, Bothaville, Klerksdorp and Ventersdorp. The southern part of the route is tolled, as the R30 forms the first section of the ZR Mahabane Toll Route, with the Brandfort Toll Plaza found 10 kilometres north of its southern terminus junction with the N1 national route. The tolled portion ends at the junction with the R730. (The R730 takes over the Toll Road status and the R30 is toll-free for its remainder)

== Route ==
Detailed Route

=== Free State ===
The R30 road begins 16 kilometres north of Bloemfontein Central, as an off-ramp of the N1 highway (northbound only). It begins as the ZR Mahabane Toll Highway and heads north-north-east for 35 kilometres, crossing the Modder River, to the town of Winnie Mandela (formerly Brandfort; renamed in 2021). As this first section is operated by SANRAL, there is a toll plaza 10 kilometres from the N1 Bloemfontein interchange (25 kilometres before Winnie Mandela), at the point where the R30 exits the Mangaung Metropolitan Municipality (just north of the settlement named Glen), named the Brandfort Toll Plaza.

At Winnie Mandela, the R30 passes through in a northeasterly direction as the main road, passing through Page Park and Brandfort Central and meeting the R703 route. The R30 continues north-north-east for 38 kilometres, crossing the Vet River into the town of Theunissen, where it bypasses the Lusaka and Masilo suburbs before passing by the town centre and meeting the R708 route. From Theunissen, the R30 continues northwards for 21 kilometres, becoming a single carriageway with 2 lanes in each direction, to reach a junction with the R730, which marks the end of the R30 being a national toll road (the ZR Mahabane Highway maintained by SANRAL continues from this junction as the R730) (The carriageway becomes the R730 north-eastwards and the R30 continues by taking the northwards off-ramp on the left).

From the R730 junction, the R30 continues northwards for 28 kilometres, crossing the Sand River and bypassing the Welkom Airport, to reach a 4-way-junction, where it meets the western terminus of the R73 route (which heads east into the Welkom Town Centre) and the north-eastern terminus of the R710.

From the Welkom junction, the R30 continues northwards for 10 kilometres to reach an intersection with the R34 road from Hoopstad. They become one road northwards for 1 kilometre as they enter the town of Odendaalsrus, before the R34 becomes its own road eastwards at the next junction near the Ross Kent South suburb. After the next junction with Odendaal Road, the R30 has one off-ramp at Van Der Vyver Street in Hospital Park.

From the Hospital Park off-ramp in Odendaalsrus, the R30 heads northwards for 55 kilometres, passing by Allanridge, meeting the R713 and R719 routes, to reach an intersection with the R59 road from Hoopstad. They become one road northwards, crossing the Vals River into the town of Bothaville. In Bothaville Central, the R30/R59 concurrency meets the R727 route. North of Bothaville, at the eastern terminus of the R504 road (a four-way-junction), the R59 becomes the road eastwards from this junction, leaving the R30 as the road northwards.

From the R504/R59 junction, the R30 heads northwards for 38 kilometres to meet the north-western terminus of the R76 road just north-west of Vierfontein. The R30 heads for another 4 kilometres to cross the Vaal River into the North-West Province town of Orkney.

=== North West ===
After crossing the Vaal River, the R30 passes through the town of Orkney and meets the R502 at the suburb of Eastleigh. From the R502 junction, the R30 continues northwards for 12 kilometres, bypassing Kanana, to enter the city of Klerksdorp as Church Street (passing through the city centre) and reach an intersection with the N12 highway as Chris Hani Road.

From the N12 junction in Klerksdorp, the R30 heads northwards for 70 kilometres, meeting the R507 road, to reach an intersection with the N14 national route and enter the town of Ventersdorp. After passing the Tshing suburb, the R30 heads east through the Ventersdorp town centre as Van Riebeeck Road and reaches an intersection with the R53 road. The 2 routes become one road, turning north onto Roth Street, then Wallis Street, exiting Ventersdorp towards the north-east. After 2 kilometres, the R53 becomes its own road northwards, leaving the R30 as the north-easterly road.

The R30 continues north-east for 73 kilometres, meeting the R509 road at Derby, to reach its northern terminus at a t-junction with the R24 road approximately 16 kilometres south of Rustenburg, just west of the Olifantsnek Dam and just south of the Kgaswane Mountain Reserve.
