= R727 (South Africa) =

Regional route in South Africa

Regional route R727

Route information
- Length: 48.1 km (29.9 mi)

Major junctions
- West end: R30 / R59 at Bothaville
- East end: R76

Location
- Country: South Africa

Highway system
- Numbered routes of South Africa
← R726	→ R730

The R727 is a Regional Route in Free State, South Africa.

== Route ==
Its western terminus is the R30 and R59 at Bothaville. It runs east, ending at the R76 between Kroonstad and Viljoenskroon.
