= R710 road =

R710 road may refer to:

- R710 road (Ireland)
- R710 (South Africa)
