= R730 road =

R730 road may refer to:

- R730 road (Ireland)
- R730 (South Africa)
