= 2009 Harmony Gold mine deaths =

Mining disaster in South Africa

Coordinates: 27°58′34″S 26°44′04″E

The deaths occurred in the Free State province of South Africa.

The 2009 Harmony Gold mine deaths occurred in late May and early June 2009 in Free State province, South Africa. At least 82 miners, many from Lesotho, Mozambique and Zimbabwe, died from inhalation of poisonous gasses created by a May 18 fire in the mineshaft.

Critically, the ranks of unemployed, independent and redundant miners are unofficially tolerated within unsecured, less-profitable mines. Consequently, in reports from Africa the dead are being officially defined as "illegal miners" — or "trespassers" — onto the mineral-claims of the larger corporate mining operators and market consortiums which traditionally depend on government-supported mineral-extraction concessions and export rights granted in areas such as Free State. A former police officer with 12 years' experience in cases of "illegal mining" said he feared that hundreds more bodies of "illegals" could still be underground in mines in the city of Welkom, according to a report in the leading Afrikaans daily, Beeld. He estimated that about 3,000 illegal miners work underground in the mines in Welkom alone.

The affected mine (the Eland shaft) is owned by Harmony Gold. Africa's third-largest gold producer and the fifth-largest in the world, Harmony is especially exposed to trespassers because the company followed a strategy of buying up old, abandoned or marginally productive mines (alongside controversial, environmentally expensive extraction techniques), which fell into disuse when gold prices were lower.

== Deaths ==
The deaths were initially thought to have been caused by a fire. One miner who escaped had reported seeing smoke and running. Harmony states that the dead were members of an illegal mining syndicate commonly referred to as Zama-Zamas. The syndicate allegedly raid Harmony's mines regularly, 'armed' with explosives. However explosives are historically a necessary technology of mining; and Harmony has not related the deaths to an attack or explosion. Harmony did initially propose a theory that mercury used to coagulate gold combined with Zama-Zamas' explosives, and led to the fire. But the dead were not found in a burnt condition, indicating their deaths may be from gas or smoke inhalation, also common effects of fire.

The numerous deaths occurred within passable sections of a mine which Harmony defined as "closed-up". Initially, 36 people were reported as dead. Fellow illegals requested body bags in which to place the bodies of their companions; these were provided by Harmony and the 36 were brought to the surface between 31 May and 1 June 2009.

A further twenty-five dead were pulled from "closed-up" sections of the mine on 2 June 2009. These were located by other illegals who searched when it was determined by Harmony that the "closed" sections occupied by illegals were too dangerous to be entered by any of the firm's staff. 63 corpses had been found by 4 June.

Both Harmony and the South African government have since said they will not compensate the families of the suffocated.

On Thursday 28 September 2017 at around 6pm the regional manager of Harmony Gold, Simphiwe Kubheka was shot dead at Harmony Mines in Welkom.

== Previous incidents ==
The corpses of illegal miners are regularly found in the same mine shaft but this is the first time such a high death toll has been recorded from one incident. Five dead were found fourteen days before this incident and twenty-five more were recovered following a fire in 2007. South African miners typically enter one mine shaft and then exit from another one several miles away. Harmony described all the miners as "criminals", issuing an initial statement reported by Reuters: "The bodies of 36 criminal miners have been brought to surface at the shaft during the past weekend by fellow criminal miners".

294 illegal miners were arrested in the same province in the previous month and another 114 in March 2009. These figures included miners from Harmony.

== Responsibility ==
On June 5, 2009, Harmony suspended 77 Harmony employees and 45 contractors who allegedly had helped the illegal mining activities, and 100 implicated employees have been arrested. According to Mining Weekly Online, 114 arrests were made, including those of another 19 Harmony employees.

Regularly employed miners and mine security personnel, some of whom earn only 4,000 Rands per month, or about $496/month (basis 6/6/2009), could be bribed to bring in needed provisions and supplies to the illegal miners, who live underground, and later help deliver the gold to the surface. The gold is smelted and transported to big cities, including Johannesburg, where the buyers wait with cash. “Everyone gets paid. The guys in the underground can make more than R10000 a week,” a resident of Welkom said.

The National Union of Mineworkers (NUM) urged Harmony to take responsibility for the deaths.

“The NUM believes that if the company has had good security on its operations, particularly world-class security systems, these deaths could have been avoided. At the heart of the problem lie lax security and unwillingness on the part of the company to invest in proper security systems. The company needs to further investigate itself with the assistance of law enforcement agencies on the possibilities that its own personnel may have been involved in allowing these so-called “illegal” mineworkers underground,” NUM spokesperson Lesiba Seshoka said in a statement.

The Congress of South African Trade Unions and Solidarity both called for a thorough investigation.

Malaisha Kipastofile, president of the Association of Informal and Illegal Miners of SA, called on the mines minister to enforce a code of practice that will ensure illegal miners can ply their trade safely. He said the reason for the illegal mining activities must be laid squarely at the door of the government and the unions, which have followed protectionist policies.

== Government response ==
Susan Shabangu, South Africa's Minister of Mining, visited the mine on 2 June 2009. She condemned the act of mining illegally but expressed her sympathies with the relatives of the victims:

The government will not condone illicit mining, but these are human lives that have been lost. Children have been orphaned and women have been widowed.

The government has refused to compensate the families of the dead miners, only providing government mortuary facilities.

== See also ==
- 2023 South Africa mining disaster
