= Wesselsbron =

- Location within Free State (South African province) Location within South Africa
- Coordinates: 27°51′S 26°22′E
- Country: South Africa
- Province: Free State
- District: Lejweleputswa
- Municipality: Nala
- Established: 1920

Area
  - Total: 14.1 km^{2} (5.4 sq mi)

Population (2011)
  - Total: 26,807
  - Density: 1,900/km^{2} (4,920/sq mi)

Racial makeup (2011)
  - Black African: 19%
  - Coloured: 0.5%
  - Indian/Asian: 0.4%
  - White: 77%
  - Other: 0.1%

First languages (2011)
  - Sotho: 75.4%
  - Xhosa: 8.9%
  - Afrikaans: 6.0%
  - Tswana: 4.2%
  - Other: 5.5%
- Time zone: UTC+2 (SAST)
- Postal code (street): 9680
- PO box: 9680
- Area code: 057

Wesselsbron is a small maize farming town 75 kilometres south of Bothaville in Free State province of South Africa.

Town 32 km east of Hoopstad and 48 km north-west of Welkom. It was laid out in 1920 and became a municipality in 1936. Named after Commandant Cornelis J Wessels who was in command of the Siege of Kimberley from 13 October 1899 to 12 February 1900. Bron is Afrikaans for ‘source’, ‘spring’.

Wesselsbron has a vast district which stretches from the Vet River in the south to the Vaal River in the north. The main cultivation is corn, but also wheat, sunflower and peanuts are cultivated. The grain silos of Senwes are the biggest silo complex in the Southern Hemisphere and can cope with the enormous amount of 275,000 tons of grain. Escorted tours can be organized to visit the silos as well as a private milling complex next to Senwes. Because of the growing demand for liquidated fertilizer, Omnia opened a factory in Wesselsbron in 1997, one of the biggest factories in South Africa. Raw material is obtained from overseas, Richards Bay, Sasolburg and Rustenburg to be processed in the Wesselsbron factory. Tons of liquidated fertilizer is distributed to the rich cultivated fields of the Western Free State, North West and North Cape. In the late 1970s due to apartheid pressure, Black people of the informal settlement of (Marantha) were removed in order to accommodate white settlers and what is now called Wesselsbron Golf Club. Black people were settled at the lower/ muddy edge of the area which was known as (Marumpenyane) now called Monyakeng.

== Education ==
At present, only basic education facilities are available in Wesselsbron and Monyakeng (township of Wesselsbron).

High Schools Hoerskool Sandveld (which is a combination of primary and high school), Iphateleng High School, Ithabeleng High School and Monyakeng High School.

Primary Schools Katoloso Primary School, Letsibolo Primary School, Mmabana Primary School and Tataiso Primary School.

== Coat of arms ==
Wesselsbron established a municipality in 1936. The council later assumed a coat of arms, and registered it with the Orange Free State Provincial Administration in September 1961.

The arms were : Argent, on a fess Azure between two birds sable in chief and in base two mealie cobs with leaves proper, a tower between two millrinds all Or. In layman's terms, the silver shield displayed, from top to bottom, two black birds, a blue horizontal stripe bearing a golden tower between two golden millrinds, and two mealie cobs.

== See also ==
- Wesselsbron virus
