= R73 =

R73 or R-73 may refer to:

- R-73 (missile), a Soviet air-to-air missile
- R73 (South Africa), a road
- HMS Cavalier (R73), a destroyer of the Royal Navy
