= Nala Local Municipality elections =

Local elections in the Free State, South Africa

The Nala Local Municipality council consists of twenty-three members elected by mixed-member proportional representation. Twelve councillors are elected by first-past-the-post voting in twelve wards, while the remaining eleven are chosen from party lists so that the total number of party representatives is proportional to the number of votes received.

In the election of 3 August 2016 the African National Congress (ANC) won a majority of fifteen seats on the council.

In the election of 1 November 2021, the ANC lost its majority, winning twelve of the available twenty-four seats.

In the election of 4 November 2026, no party won a majority. The ANC remained the largest party, with nine seats.

== Results ==
The following table shows the composition of the council after past elections.

Event	ANC	COPE	DA	EFF	FF+	PAC	Other	Total
2000 election	15	—	3	—	—	4	1	23
2006 election	20	—	2	—	1	1	0	24
2011 election	18	2	3	—	1	0	0	24
2016 election	15	0	3	5	1	—	0	24
2021 election	12	0	2	6	2	—	2	24
2026 election	9	—	2	4	2	—	6	23

== December 2000 election ==
The following table shows the results of the 2000 election.

Party	Ward			List			Total seats
Party	Votes	%	Seats	Votes	%	Seats	Total seats
African National Congress	11,017	63.53	11	11,490	67.14	4	15
Pan Africanist Congress of Azania	2,868	16.54	0	2,904	16.97	4	4
Democratic Alliance	1,735	10.01	1	1,853	10.83	2	3
United Democratic Movement	907	5.23	0	866	5.06	1	1
Independent candidates	814	4.69	0				0
Total	17,341	100.00	12	17,113	100.00	11	23
Valid votes	17,341	98.34		17,113	97.04		
Invalid/blank votes	293	1.66		522	2.96		
Total votes	17,634	100.00		17,635	100.00		
Registered voters/turnout	37,075	47.56		37,075	47.57		

== March 2006 election ==
The following table shows the results of the 2006 election.

Party	Ward			List			Total seats
Party	Votes	%	Seats	Votes	%	Seats	Total seats
African National Congress	16,668	84.82	12	16,597	84.54	8	20
Democratic Alliance	1,277	6.50	0	1,245	6.34	2	2
Pan Africanist Congress of Azania	636	3.24	0	557	2.84	1	1
Freedom Front Plus	561	2.85	0	576	2.93	1	1
United Democratic Movement	310	1.58	0	329	1.68	0	0
African Christian Democratic Party	120	0.61	0	232	1.18	0	0
Independent Democrats	79	0.40	0	96	0.49	0	0
Total	19,651	100.00	12	19,632	100.00	12	24
Valid votes	19,651	98.16		19,632	98.04		
Invalid/blank votes	368	1.84		392	1.96		
Total votes	20,019	100.00		20,024	100.00		
Registered voters/turnout	40,051	49.98		40,051	50.00		

== May 2011 election ==
The following table shows the results of the 2011 election.

Party	Ward			List			Total seats
Party	Votes	%	Seats	Votes	%	Seats	Total seats
African National Congress	14,912	73.50	11	15,205	74.60	7	18
Democratic Alliance	2,744	13.53	1	2,700	13.25	2	3
Congress of the People	1,743	8.59	0	1,723	8.45	2	2
Freedom Front Plus	529	2.61	0	446	2.19	1	1
Pan Africanist Congress of Azania	141	0.69	0	115	0.56	0	0
United Democratic Movement	107	0.53	0	102	0.50	0	0
African Christian Democratic Party	112	0.55	0	92	0.45	0	0
Total	20,288	100.00	12	20,383	100.00	12	24
Valid votes	20,288	98.08		20,383	98.53		
Invalid/blank votes	398	1.92		304	1.47		
Total votes	20,686	100.00		20,687	100.00		
Registered voters/turnout	39,223	52.74		39,223	52.74		

== August 2016 election ==
The following table shows the results of the 2016 election.

Party	Ward			List			Total seats
Party	Votes	%	Seats	Votes	%	Seats	Total seats
African National Congress	13,701	61.41	12	13,670	61.68	3	15
Economic Freedom Fighters	4,475	20.06	0	4,537	20.47	5	5
Democratic Alliance	2,296	10.29	0	2,374	10.71	3	3
Freedom Front Plus	1,013	4.54	0	917	4.14	1	1
Congress of the People	282	1.26	0	228	1.03	0	0
African Christian Democratic Party	185	0.83	0	184	0.83	0	0
Independent candidates	198	0.89	0				0
Agang South Africa	92	0.41	0	93	0.42	0	0
African People's Convention	10	0.04	0	114	0.51	0	0
United Residents Front	58	0.26	0	46	0.21	0	0
Total	22,310	100.00	12	22,163	100.00	12	24
Valid votes	22,310	98.21		22,163	97.83		
Invalid/blank votes	406	1.79		491	2.17		
Total votes	22,716	100.00		22,654	100.00		
Registered voters/turnout	40,437	56.18		40,437	56.02		

=== By-elections from August 2016 to November 2021 ===
In a by-election held on 5 September 2018, a ward previously held by an ANC councillor was won by the DA candidate. Council composition was reconfigured as seen below:

Party	Ward	PR list	Total
ANC	11	3	14
Economic Freedom Fighters	0	5	5
DA	1	3	4
VF+	0	1	1
Total	12	12	24

== November 2021 election ==
The following table shows the results of the 2021 election.

Party	Ward			List			Total seats
Party	Votes	%	Seats	Votes	%	Seats	Total seats
African National Congress	8,468	48.47	11	8,568	48.97	1	12
Economic Freedom Fighters	4,078	23.34	0	4,037	23.07	6	6
Democratic Alliance	1,620	9.27	1	1,683	9.62	1	2
Nala Community Forum	1,432	8.20	0	1,495	8.54	2	2
Freedom Front Plus	1,080	6.18	0	1,025	5.86	2	2
Forum for Service Delivery	229	1.31	0	209	1.19	0	0
African Transformation Movement	130	0.74	0	164	0.94	0	0
Independent candidates	284	1.63	0				0
African Christian Democratic Party	99	0.57	0	146	0.83	0	0
Congress of the People	43	0.25	0	94	0.54	0	0
Inkatha Freedom Party	6	0.03	0	77	0.44	0	0
Total	17,469	100.00	12	17,498	100.00	12	24
Valid votes	17,469	98.41		17,498	98.02		
Invalid/blank votes	283	1.59		353	1.98		
Total votes	17,752	100.00		17,851	100.00		
Registered voters/turnout	37,963	46.76		37,963	47.02		

=== By-elections from November 2021 ===
The following by-elections were held to fill vacant ward seats in the period from November 2021.

Date	Ward	Party of the previous councillor	Party of the newly elected councillor
14 Feb 2024	11	African National Congress	African National Congress
10 Sep 2025	5	African National Congress	African National Congress

== November 2026 election ==
The following table shows the results of the 2026 election.

Party	Ward			List			Total seats
Party	Votes	%	Seats	Votes	%	Seats	Total seats
African National Congress	8,566	38.68	9	8,373	37.81	0	9
Economic Freedom Fighters	4,033	18.21	1	4,054	18.31	3	4
Nala Progressive Movement	4,001	18.07	1	4,077	18.41	3	4
Democratic Alliance	1,908	8.62	1	1,923	8.68	1	2
Freedom Front Plus	1,566	7.07	0	1,544	6.97	2	2
South African Communist Party	795	3.59	0	806	3.64	1	1
Nala Community Forum	708	3.20	0	826	3.73	1	1
Afrika Mayibuye Movement	211	0.95	0	218	0.98	0	0
African Transformation Movement	155	0.70	0	166	0.75	0	0
African Congress for Transformation	128	0.58	0	104	0.47	0	0
Patriotic Alliance	23	0.10	0	53	0.24	0	0
uMkhonto weSizwe Party	51	0.23	0				0
Total	22,145	100.00	12	22,144	100.00	11	23
Valid votes	22,145	98.33		22,144	98.39		
Invalid/blank votes	377	1.67		363	1.61		
Total votes	22,522	100.00		22,507	100.00		
Registered voters/turnout	42,921	52.47		42,921	52.44		
