= Tswelopele Local Municipality =

Tswelopele
- Local municipality
- Seal

- Location in the Free State
- Coordinates: 28°17′27″S 26°09′00″E
- Country: South Africa
- Province: Free State
- District: Lejweleputswa
- Seat: Bultfontein
- Wards: 8

Government
  - Type: Municipal council
  - Mayor: Rosy Phukuntse

Area
  - Total: 6,524 km^{2} (2,519 sq mi)

Population (2022)
  - Total: 56,896
  - Density: 8.721/km^{2} (22.59/sq mi)

Racial makeup (2022)
  - Black African: 91.6%
  - Coloured: 0.5%
  - Indian/Asian: 0.3%
  - White: 7.4%

First languages (2011)
  - Sotho: 54.0%
  - Xhosa: 19.9%
  - Tswana: 12.0%
  - Afrikaans: 8.3%
  - Other: 5.8%
- Time zone: UTC+2 (SAST)
- Municipal code: FS183

Tswelopele Municipality (Sotho: Masepala wa Tswelopele; Xhosa: uMasipala wase Tswelopele; Tswana: Mmasepala wa Tswelopele) is a local municipality within the Lejweleputswa District Municipality, in the Free State province of South Africa. Tswelopele is a Sesotho word meaning "progress".

== Main places ==
The 2001 census divided the municipality into the following main places:

| Place | Code | Area (km^{2}) | Population | Most spoken language |
|---|---|---|---|---|
| Bultfontein | 40901 | 42.75 | 1,034 | Afrikaans |
| Hoopstad | 40902 | 28.34 | 662 | Afrikaans |
| Phahameng | 40903 | 3.37 | 20,063 | Sotho |
| Tikwana | 40904 | 1.73 | 11,032 | Sotho |
| Remainder of the municipality | 40905 | 6,447.20 | 20,913 | Sotho |

== Politics ==
The municipal council consists of sixteen members elected by mixed-member proportional representation. Eight councillors are elected by first-past-the-post voting in eight wards, while the remaining eight are chosen from party lists so that the total number of party representatives is proportional to the number of votes received.

In the 2026 South African municipal elections the African National Congress (ANC) lost its majority, but remains the largest party, with eight seats on the council.

The following table shows the results of the 2026 election.

| Party | Ward | | | List | | | Total seats |
| Party | Votes | % | Seats | Votes | % | Seats | Total seats |
|---|---|---|---|---|---|---|---|
| African National Congress | 8,091 | 51.69 | 8 | 8,009 | 51.30 | 0 | 8 |
| Democratic Alliance | 3,315 | 21.18 | 0 | 3,331 | 21.34 | 4 | 4 |
| Economic Freedom Fighters | 1,657 | 10.59 | 0 | 1,661 | 10.64 | 2 | 2 |
| South African Communist Party | 1,347 | 8.61 | 0 | 1,355 | 8.68 | 1 | 1 |
| Freedom Front Plus | 583 | 3.72 | 0 | 584 | 3.74 | 1 | 1 |
| 7 other parties | 660 | 4.22 | 0 | 672 | 4.30 | 0 | 0 |
| Total | 15,653 | 100.00 | 8 | 15,612 | 100.00 | 8 | 16 |
| Valid votes | 15,653 | 97.97 | | 15,612 | 97.67 | | |
| Invalid/blank votes | 324 | 2.03 | | 372 | 2.33 | | |
| Total votes | 15,977 | 100.00 | | 15,984 | 100.00 | | |
| Registered voters/turnout | 28,107 | 56.84 | | 28,107 | 56.87 | | |
