= Balkfontein =

- Location within Free State (South African province) Location within South Africa
- Coordinates: 27°24′0″S 26°30′15″E
- Country: South Africa
- Province: Free State
- District: Lejweleputswa
- Municipality: Nala

Area
  - Total: 1.12 km^{2} (0.43 sq mi)

Population (2011)
  - Total: 154
  - Density: 138/km^{2} (356/sq mi)

Racial makeup (2011)
  - Black African: 35.1%
  - Coloured: 4.5%
  - White: 60.4%

First languages (2011)
  - Afrikaans: 64.1%
  - Sotho: 30.1%
  - Tswana: 2.6%
  - Northern Sotho: 1.3%
  - Other: 2.0%
- Time zone: UTC+2 (SAST)

Balkfontein is a small village in Nala Local Municipality in the Lejweleputswa District of the Free State in South Africa.

The village houses the "Sedibeng Water" utility that operates a water purification works drawing water from the Vaal River inlet. The small town has residences and facilities, including a golf course, for employees of Sedibeng.
