= R710 (South Africa) =

Regional route in South Africa

Regional route R710

Route information
- Maintained by FSDPRT
- Length: 66 km (41 mi)

Major junctions
- North-east end: R30 / R73 at Welkom
- R719 at Bultfontein
- South-west end: R700 in Bultfontein

Location
- Country: South Africa

Highway system
- Numbered routes of South Africa
← R709	→ R711

The R710 is a Regional Route in Free State, South Africa that connects Welkom with Bultfontein.

== Route ==
Its north-eastern terminus is a junction with the R30 and R73 at Welkom (west of the town centre). It initially runs west, before bending south-west. It crosses the Sand River and the Vet River before entering Bultfontein, where it meets the southern terminus of the R719. Just after, it reaches its end at a junction with the R700 north of the town centre.
