= R73 (South Africa) =

Provincial route in South Africa

Provincial route R73

Route information
- Maintained by FSDPRT
- Length: 73.9 km (45.9 mi)

Major junctions
- North end: R30 in Welkom
- South end: N1 near Winburg

Location
- Country: South Africa
- Major cities: Welkom; Virginia

Highway system
- Numbered routes of South Africa
| ← R72 | → R74 |

The R73 is a provincial route in Free State, South Africa that connects Welkom with Winburg via Virginia.

== Route ==
Detailed Route

The R73 begins in Welkom (west of the town centre), at a junction with the R30 road. West of this intersection, it is the R710 road towards Bultfontein. The R73 begins by going eastwards into Welkom Central as Stateway, co-signed with the M4 road of Welkom, up to the 3rd roundabout, where it meets the M1 road of Welkom (Koppie Alleen Road). The R73 joins the M1 northwards up to the next roundabout, where the R73 becomes its own road eastwards as Jan Hofmeyr Street.

After the next roundabout with Power Road, the R73 becomes a dual carriageway and meets the R730 road (ZR Mahabane Highway) at the 2nd junction afterwards, south of Thabong. The R730 joins the R73 and they are co-signed southwards on the dual carriageway for 10 kilometres before the R73 leaves the ZR Mahabane Highway (R730) and becomes its own road eastwards.

The R73 goes eastwards through the northern suburbs of Virginia (Saaiplaas and Harmony) for 9 kilometres up to a 4-way-junction, where the R73 becomes the road southwards, proceeding to cross the Sand River in the eastern suburbs of Virginia.

From the Sand River bridge in Virginia, the R73 goes southwards for 40 kilometres to reach its terminus at a t-junction with the N1 national route approximately 11 kilometres north of Winburg.
