= Welkom mining explosion =

2023 disaster in South Africa

- Date: c. 18 May 2023
- Location: Welkom, Free State, South Africa
- Deaths: ≥31 (suspected)

At least 31 people are suspected to have died in a methane gas explosion at a disused gold mine in South Africa around the third week of May in 2023.

The Department of Mineral Resources and Energy (DMRE) reported late on 22 June 2023 that the miners had died in a mining shaft at the abandoned Virginia mine in Welkom, Free State. The miners, believed to be foreign nationals from Lesotho who were there mining illegally, may have died on or around 18 May 2023.

== Background ==
The mine, previously owned by Harmony Gold, had last been operational during the 1990s. (Note: A spokesperson for Harmony stated that the mine was acquired during the mid-1980s, but was closed and never used by them because of a methane gas explosion that occurred shortly thereafter.) Most of the victims were from the district of Berea in Lesotho.

== Initial reports ==
Gwede Mantashe, South African minister of mineral resources and energy, stated that Harmony had noted that there was dust coming out of the ventilation shaft on 17 May, which they believe was the day of the disaster, but had not suspected anything because the mine was closed. Mantashe also stated that Harmony was informed of the incident on 23 May, via the consulate of Lesotho.

The foreign ministry of Lesotho informed the South African high commissioner in Maseru of the disaster on 10 June, after family members of some of the victims had reported them missing.

== Investigation ==
Harmony considers the incident a criminal matter, and has been helping with an investigation. At the time the DMRE first publicized the incident, they had determined that the level of methane in Shaft 5, where the victims had died, was very high, preventing the safe retrieval of the other bodies. Three bodies had previously been retrieved by other miners.

== Response ==
Makhabane Peete, a traditional chief of the district, stated that the affected families only sought the retrieval and repatriation of the bodies.

== See also ==
- 2009 Harmony Gold mine deaths
