= Nala Local Municipality =

Nala
- Local municipality
- Seal

- Location in the Free State
- Coordinates: 27°23′14″S 26°37′05″E
- Country: South Africa
- Province: Free State
- District: Lejweleputswa
- Seat: Bothaville
- Wards: 12

Government
  - Type: Municipal council
  - Mayor: Nozililo Mashiya-Ntema

Area
  - Total: 4,129 km^{2} (1,594 sq mi)

Population (2022)
  - Total: 90,561
  - Density: 21.93/km^{2} (56.81/sq mi)

Racial makeup (2022)
  - Black African: 93.8%
  - Coloured: 0.5%
  - Indian/Asian: 0.3%
  - White: 5.3%

First languages (2011)
  - Sotho: 73.3%
  - Xhosa: 8.7%
  - Afrikaans: 7.3%
  - Tswana: 3.9%
  - Other: 6.8%
- Time zone: UTC+2 (SAST)
- Municipal code: FS185

Nala Municipality (Sotho: Masepala wa Nala) is a local municipality within the Lejweleputswa District Municipality, in the Free State province of South Africa. Nala is a Sesotho word meaning "affluence or plenty". It is derived from the maize belt and economic prosperity of the area. The municipality serves the community in and around Bothaville, Kgotsong, Wesselsbron and Monyakeng.

== Main places ==
The 2011 census divided the municipality into the following main places:

| Place | Census code | Area (km^{2}) | Population |
|---|---|---|---|
| Balkfontein | 468004 | 1.12 | 154 |
| Bothaville | 468001 | 33.26 | 4,152 |
| Kgotsong | 468002 | 9.74 | 41,878 |
| Monyakeng | 468005 | 3.80 | 25,392 |
| Wesselsbron | 468006 | 10.26 | 1,415 |
| Remainder of the municipality | 468003 | 4,070.61 | 8,229 |

== Politics ==
The municipal council consists of twenty-three members elected by mixed-member proportional representation. Twelve councillors are elected by first-past-the-post voting in twelve wards, while the remaining eleven are chosen from party lists so that the total number of party representatives is proportional to the number of votes received.

In the election of 4 November 2026, no party won a majority. The ANC remained the largest party, with nine seats.

The following table shows the results of the 2026 election.

| Party | Ward | | | List | | | Total seats |
| Party | Votes | % | Seats | Votes | % | Seats | Total seats |
|---|---|---|---|---|---|---|---|
| African National Congress | 8,566 | 38.68 | 9 | 8,373 | 37.81 | 0 | 9 |
| Economic Freedom Fighters | 4,033 | 18.21 | 1 | 4,054 | 18.31 | 3 | 4 |
| Nala Progressive Movement | 4,001 | 18.07 | 1 | 4,077 | 18.41 | 3 | 4 |
| Democratic Alliance | 1,908 | 8.62 | 1 | 1,923 | 8.68 | 1 | 2 |
| Freedom Front Plus | 1,566 | 7.07 | 0 | 1,544 | 6.97 | 2 | 2 |
| South African Communist Party | 795 | 3.59 | 0 | 806 | 3.64 | 1 | 1 |
| Nala Community Forum | 708 | 3.20 | 0 | 826 | 3.73 | 1 | 1 |
| 5 other parties | 568 | 2.56 | 0 | 541 | 2.44 | 0 | 0 |
| Total | 22,145 | 100.00 | 12 | 22,144 | 100.00 | 11 | 23 |
| Valid votes | 22,145 | 98.33 | | 22,144 | 98.39 | | |
| Invalid/blank votes | 377 | 1.67 | | 363 | 1.61 | | |
| Total votes | 22,522 | 100.00 | | 22,507 | 100.00 | | |
| Registered voters/turnout | 42,921 | 52.47 | | 42,921 | 52.44 | | |
