= Welkom =

City in Free State, South Africa

Welkom Matjhabeng
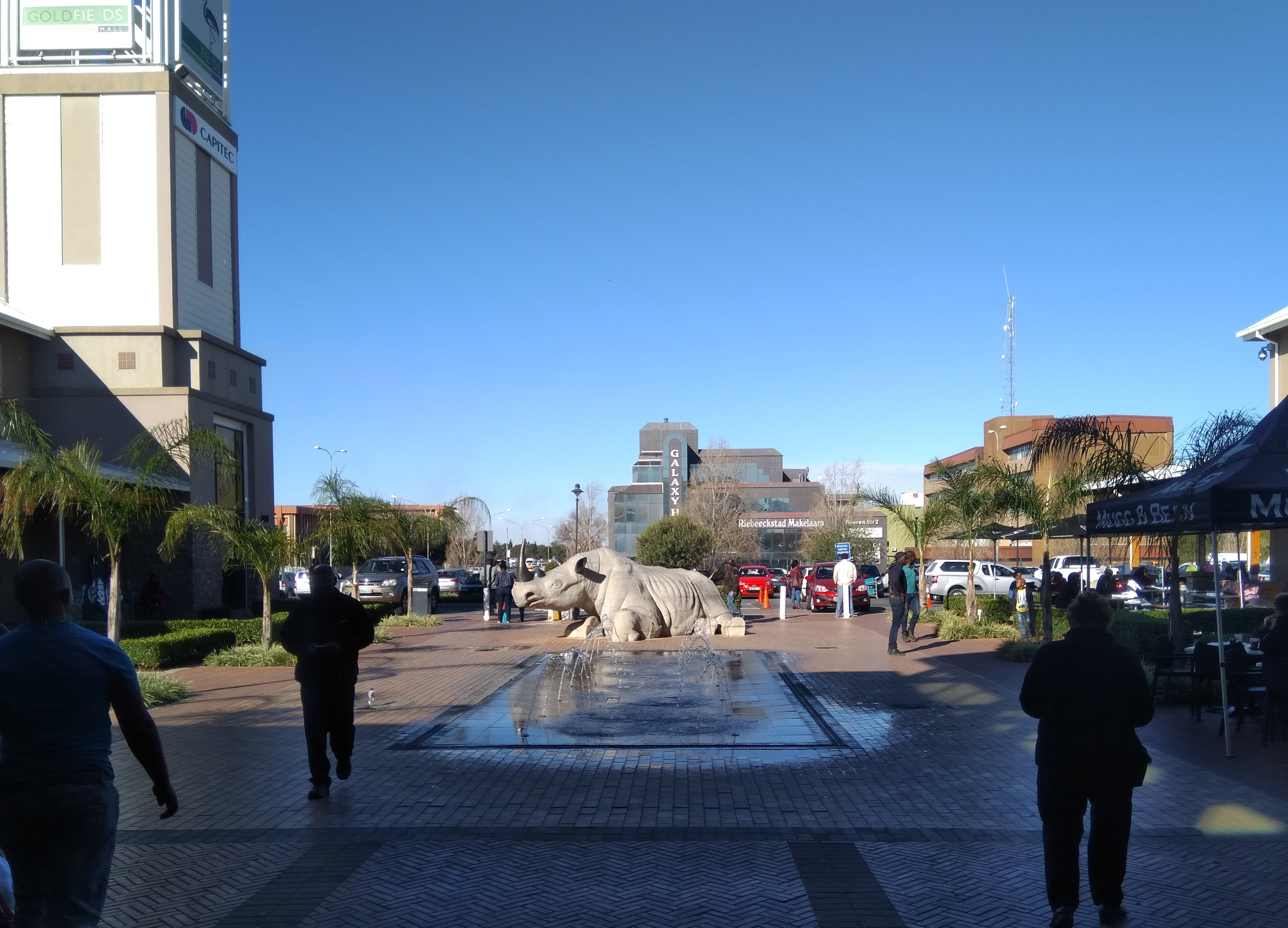
- Goldfields Mall

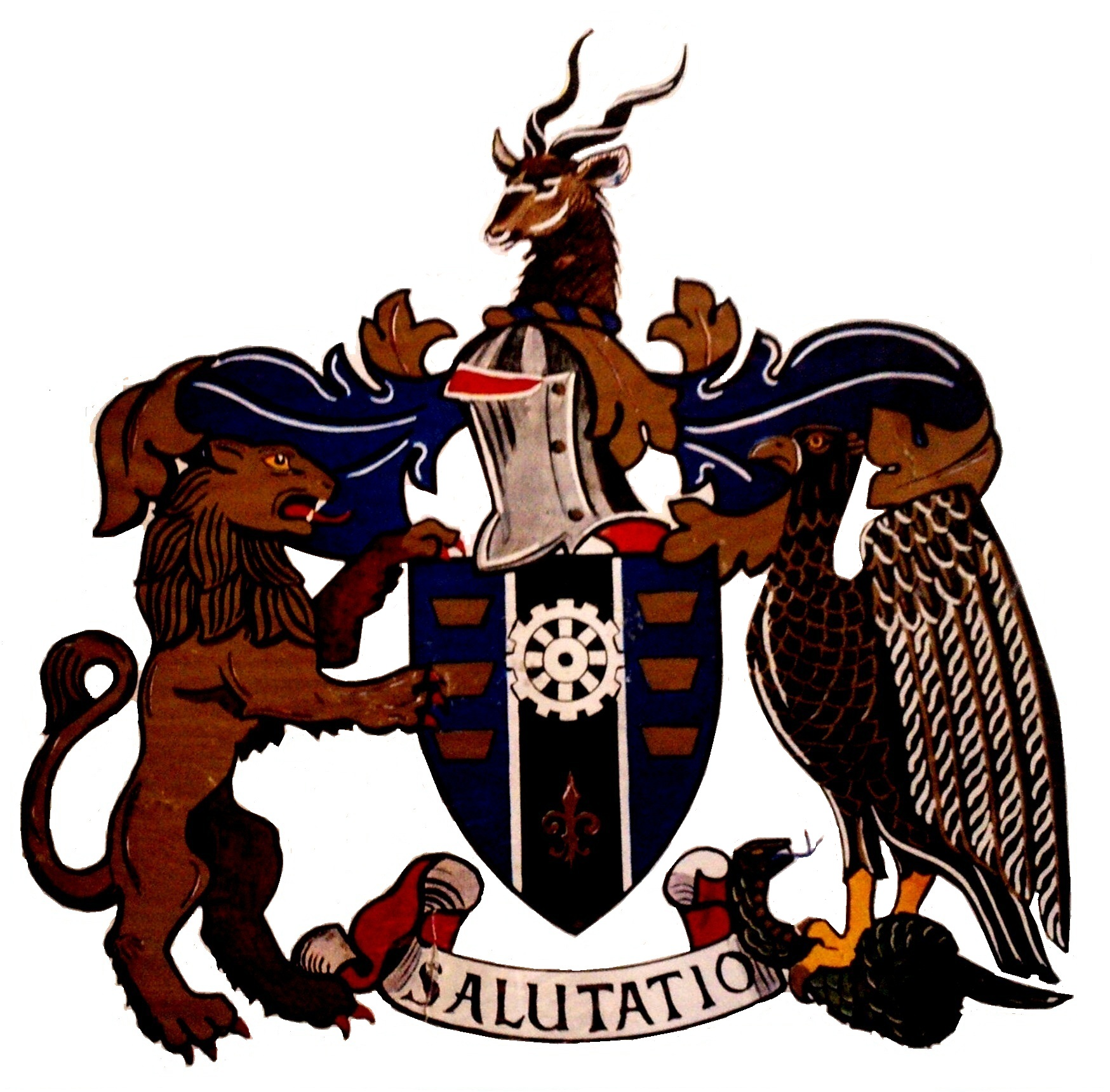
- Coat of arms
- Nicknames: Circle City; City Within a Garden; Mvela
- Location within Free State (South African province) Location within South Africa Location within Africa
- Coordinates: 27°58′59″S 26°43′15″E
- Country: South Africa
- Province: Free State
- District: Lejweleputswa
- Municipality: Matjhabeng

Area
  - Total: 167.6 km^{2} (64.7 sq mi)
- Elevation: 1,435 m (4,708 ft)

Population (2011)
  - Total: 64,130
  - Density: 382.6/km^{2} (991.0/sq mi)

Racial makeup (2011)
  - Black: 60.7%
  - White: 26.9%
  - Coloured: 11.1%
  - Indian/Asian: 0.9%
  - Other: 0.4%

First languages (2011)
  - Afrikaans: 38.4%
  - Sotho: 33.4%
  - English: 10.7%
  - Xhosa: 8.9%
  - Other: 8.5%
- Time zone: UTC+2 (SAST)
- Postal code (street): 9459
- PO box: 9460
- Area code: 057
- Website: Official website

Welkom (Afrikaans pronunciation: [ˈvɛlkɔm]) is a city in the Free State province of South Africa, located about 140 kilometres (90 mi) northeast of Bloemfontein, the provincial capital. Welkom is also known as Circle City, City Within A Garden, Mvela and Matjhabeng. The city's Sesotho name, Matjhabeng means 'where nations meet', derived from the migrant labour system, where people of various countries such as Lesotho, Malawi and Mozambique etc. met to work in the mines of the gold fields.

A settlement was laid out on a farm named "Welkom" (which is the Afrikaans and Dutch word for "welcome") after gold was discovered in the region, and it was officially proclaimed a town in 1948. The town became a municipality in 1961. It now falls in the Matjhabeng Municipality, part of the Lejweleputswa District.

== History ==
Much of the history of Welkom is centred around the discovery of gold in the northwestern Free State. It was proclaimed a town in 1948, nine years after a major gold discovery was made in Odendaalsrus, just north of Welkom.

=== Early mining activity ===
Prospecting pit of Arthur Megson circa 1904

The first prospecting in the area was done by the Englishmen Mr Donaldson and Mr Hinds on a portion of the farm Zoeten-Inval in 1896. The men discovered a small outcrop which seemed to be a conglomerate pebble reef, but they failed to raise interest among mining companies who at that stage did not believe that there was gold to be discovered south of the Vaal River. They returned to England to test the samples they had extracted, but died before reaching their destination when their ship sank in the Bay of Biscay.

Prospector Arthur Megson heard of their venture and decided to investigate near the town of Odendaalsrus in 1904. He gathered samples of exposed strata near an outcrop, which by then was part of Hendrik Petrus Klopper's farm Aandenk. He too did not succeed in obtaining any interest from companies until October 1932, when he presented his findings to Allan Roberts and Mannie Jacobs. The area needed to be tested by drilling, and the first borehole was started on 5 May 1933. Jacobs managed to interest two men, Fritz Marx and Peter Woolf, in the venture and the Wit Extensions Company was formed later that year. Although the borehole, which by then penetrated more than 1200 metres, yielded 120-inch pennyweights of gold (roughly 480 centimetre grams per ton), it was not enough to garner financial assistance and the operation had to close due to depleted finances. (For gold ores to be payable in South Africa, the grade must typically exceed 960 cengrams – the equivalent of 8 grams per ton over a 120 cm stope width, which after dilution will yield 4g/t in the mill).

However, the discovery of gold-bearing reef in the Klerksdorp area in 1933 by the Anglo American Corporation encouraged geologists and others with vision to see the northwestern Free State as a potential gold field. Prospecting intensified and the first high values of gold were discovered in 1939. By 1940, sufficient work had been done to prove the existence of gold in the area and thirteen mining areas were later demarcated around what would become the town of Welkom.

=== Development of the settlement ===
Welkom officially came into being on 15 April 1947, six years after the first mining lease in the area was awarded to the St Helena Gold Mining Company, and was proclaimed a town on 23 July 1948. On 14 February 1968, after 21 years of existence, Welkom received city status, and celebrated this event with the opening of the Civic Centre by Mrs Martie du Plessis. The construction of this building commenced in 1964.

=== Apartheid era ===
During Apartheid in the years of segregation, the townships of Thabong and Bronville were established for black and Coloured people, respectively.

On 8 December 1976, Welkom experienced an earthquake measuring 5.2 on the Richter magnitude scale. The most significant damage caused was the total collapse of a six-storey block of flats about 75 minutes after the event. Widespread damage to many other buildings was experienced throughout the city. Despite extensive damage to surface and underground mining structures, only four deaths occurred.

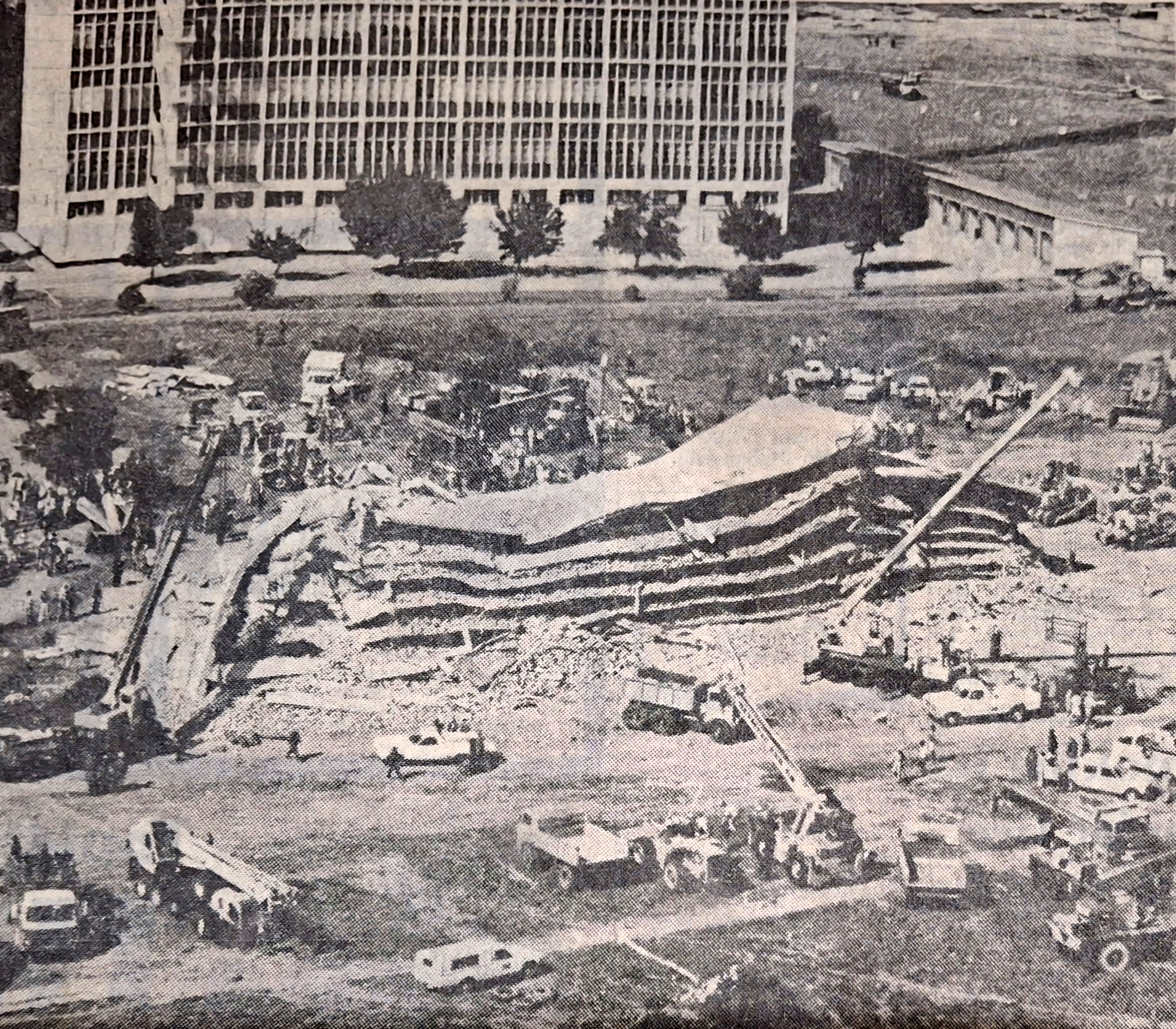
1976 Earthquake Tempest Court building collapse

During the decline of the Apartheid era, race relations were particularly problematic as many White South Africans felt threatened by the eventuality of a regime change. This was the main cause of the events that transpired on 13 May 1989, when the mayor, a Mr Gus Gouws, was tarred and feathered after officiating at a multiracial wheelchair marathon event. The National Party mayor ran foul of his White constituency when he proposed the opening of a taxi rank in the business district of Welkom.

Aggrieved residents of the city then sought to humiliate him to dissuade him from authorising the erection of the facility, by assaulting him and a security guard, while he was officiating at the event. Four men were arrested and charged with the assault.

=== 1990–present ===
On 20 March 1990, Welkom was struck by a multi-vortex tornado which went through the suburbs. This tornado was part of a 240 km long storm front and had a width of up to 1.7 km. This weather event proved to be the most devastating recorded, from the financial and insurance point of view, in South Africa to date, destroying 4,000 homes.

On 26 September 1990, Welkom experienced a seismic event with a magnitude of 4.2, which resulted in two deaths and five injuries.

The mining company Pamodzi Gold applied for bankruptcy in 2009 even though it was sitting atop one of the richest and consistently-producing gold veins in the world. The gold mine, President Steyn, was previously owned by the Thistle Mining Co., up until February 2008, and reported a total sale of 15.1 tonnes (487,069 ozt) of gold from 2004 to 2006. On 29 October 2007, Thistle Gold Mining entered into a 'Sale of Shares and Claims Agreement' under the South African government's black economic empowerment laws, under which Thistle's direct and indirect interests were sold to Pamodzi Gold for $14-million. In 2010, Harmony Gold subsequently acquired President Steyn from the now liquidated Pamodzi Gold and resumed operations. In 2023, an explosion at an illegal mine killed about 30 people.

=== Water and sewage crises ===
As of March 2026, the Department of Water and Sanitation is implementing massive infrastructure upgrades in Welkom to address collapsed systems, with R1.2 billion already spent and R4.2 billion committed. Key interventions include upgrading 42 pump stations and Waste Water Treatment Works (WWTW) in Thabong to combat sewage infrastructure.

== Geography ==
=== Topography ===
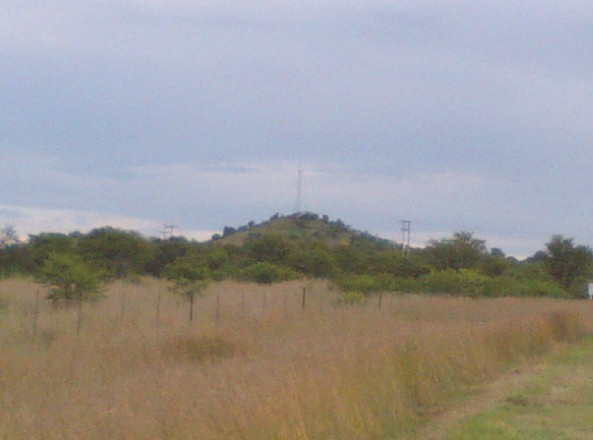
Koppie Alleen

Koppie Alleen is the only hill near Welkom and therefore is aptly named for its oddity. The terrain elevation above sea level is 1435 metres. The largest water catchment is the Sand River to the south-east of Welkom in Virginia's direction. Large saline pans such as Flamingo Pan and Theronia Pan are situated to the south-west of Welkom. Flamingo Pan is coded as an Important Bird Area (IBA)

=== Neighborhoods ===
- Rheederpark
- West Bedelia
- Welkom ext
- Jim Fouche Park
- Alma
- Flamingo Park
- Seemeeu Park
- Dagbreek
- Reitzpark
- Stateway
- Doorn
- Welkom Central
- Jan Cilliers Park
- Naudeville
- St Helena
- Bedelia
- Lake View South
- Lake View North
- Orangia
- Welkom North
- Riebeeckstad
- Sandania
- Bronville
- Thabong

=== Streetscape ===
Welkom is well known for its efficient road traffic design mainly through the use of traffic circles, which has been the basis of worldwide studies. This is encouraged by flow design, the minimum of stop streets and the total absence of traffic lights and parking meters in the Central Business District. There are currently 33 large traffic circles.

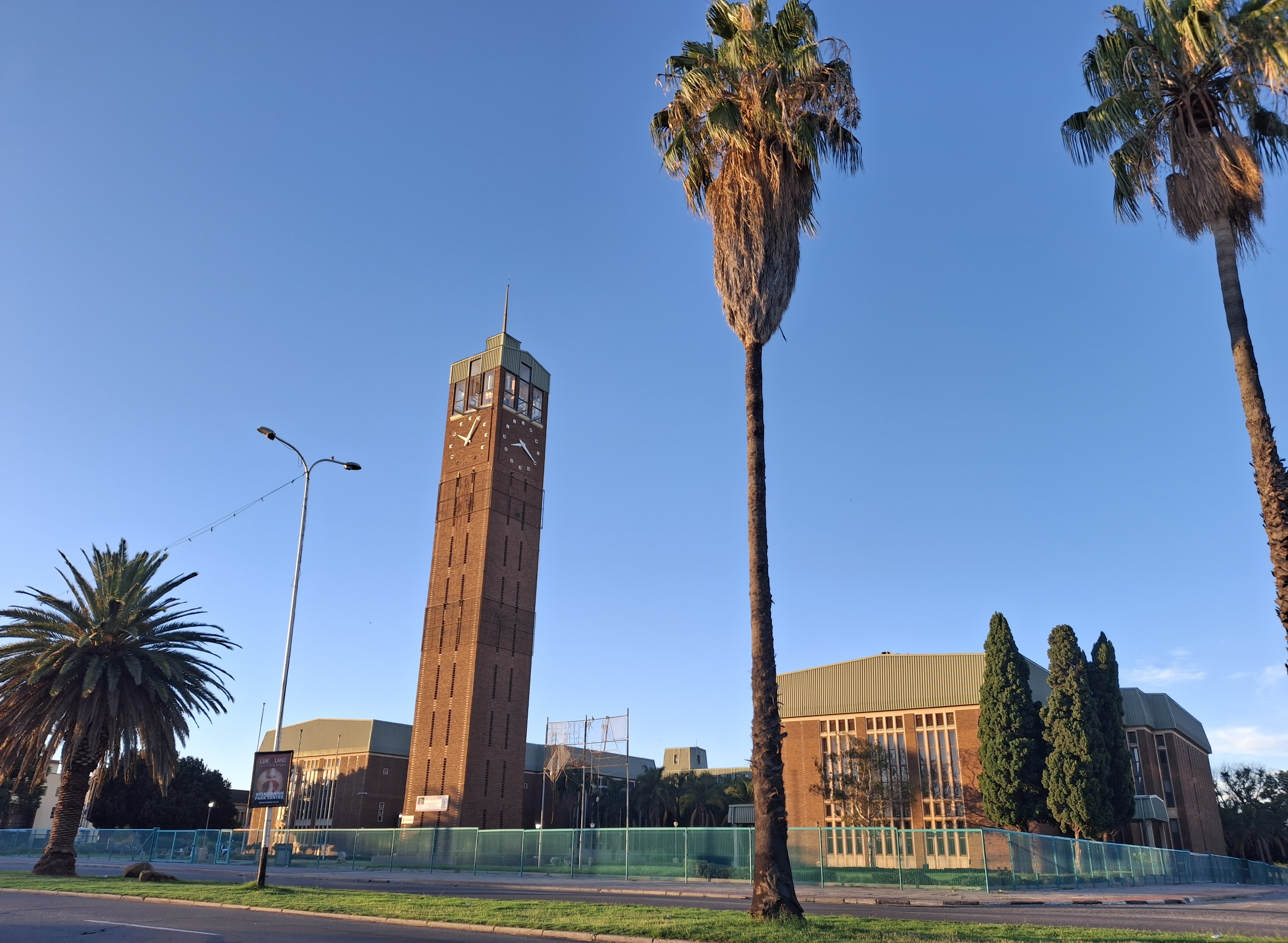
Welkom Municipal and Mayors offices

=== Monuments and public art ===
Welkom has several monuments including:

- Aandenk Monument – This borehole memorial is shaped in the form of a key and symbolises the unlocking of the Free State goldfields.(next to Allanridge)
- Afrikaans Language Monument
- Joanne Pim Monument
- WWII Monument
- Voortrekker Memorial
- Dog Monument
- Old Indaba Bluegum Tree
- MOTH Memorial
- Gold Museum – A complete history of gold and its mining and production was on display. St Helena Gold Mine is not a working mine any more. Until a few years ago It was still possible to visit the mine and its wine cellar at 857m below surface but it does not exist any more.
- Museum of Welkom – The public library houses a display of the discovery of gold in Welkom, the city's history and bird and animal life indigenous to this region.
- Local Apartheid Memorial – commemorating local citizen's contribution to the Struggle in the Apartheid years.

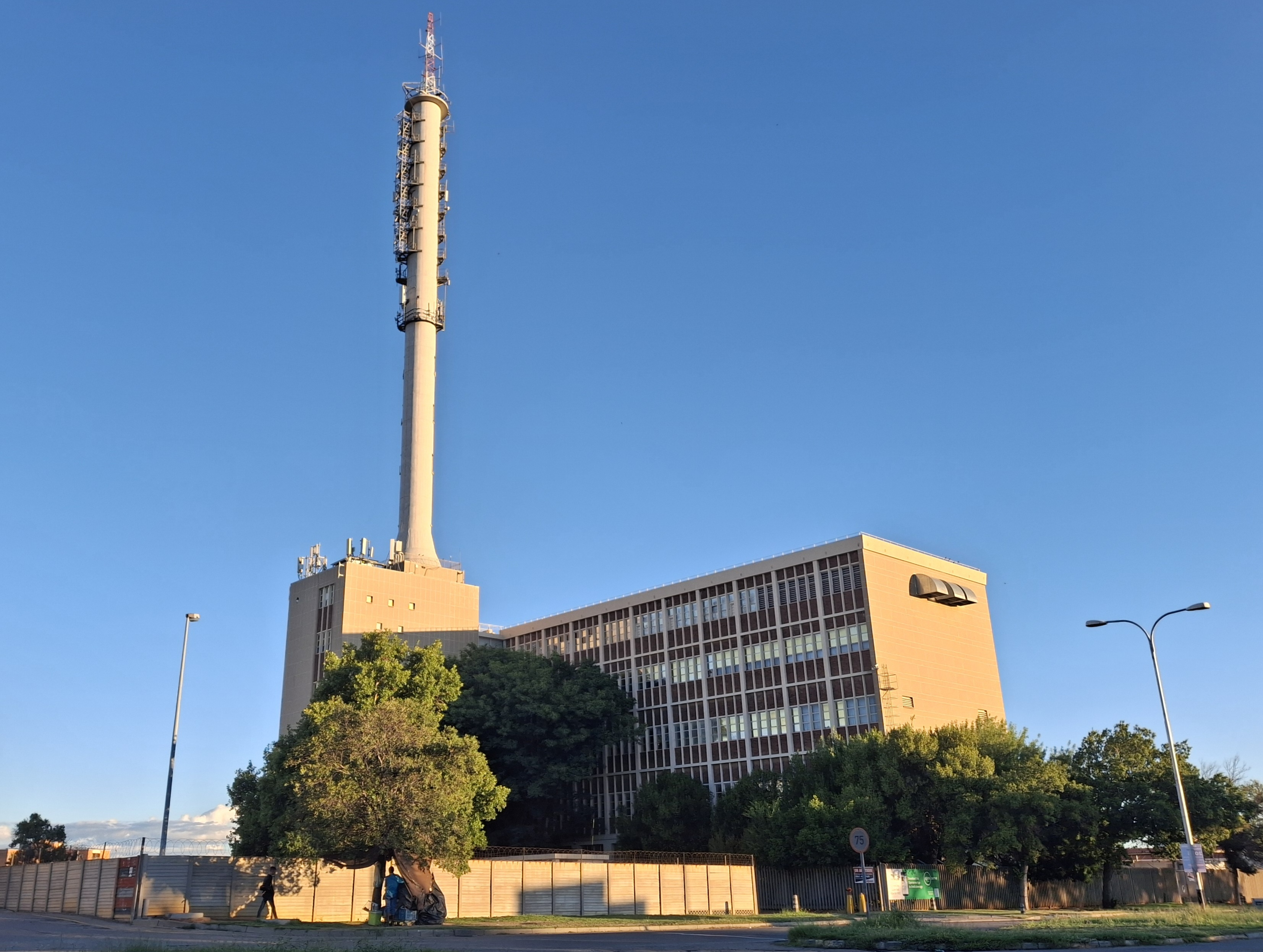
Telkom Tower is the tallest structure in the Goldfields

=== Climate ===
Welkom normally receives about 401 mm to 550 mm of rain per year, dependent on wet or dry cycles, with most rainfall occurring mainly during mid-summer. It receives the lowest rainfall (0 mm) in July and the highest (70 mm) in January. The monthly distribution of average daily maximum temperatures ranges from 17 °C in June to 29 °C in January. The region is the coldest during July when the mercury drops to 0 °C on average during the night.

Climate data for Welkom
| Month | Jan | Feb | Mar | Apr | May | Jun | Jul | Aug | Sep | Oct | Nov | Dec | Year |
|---|---|---|---|---|---|---|---|---|---|---|---|---|---|
| Mean daily maximum °C (°F) | 32 (90) | 32 (90) | 30 (86) | 27 (81) | 23 (73) | 21 (70) | 20 (68) | 23 (73) | 27 (81) | 30 (86) | 31 (88) | 32 (90) | 27 (81) |
| Mean daily minimum °C (°F) | 17 (63) | 17 (63) | 15 (59) | 11 (52) | 6 (43) | 3 (37) | 2 (36) | 5 (41) | 9 (48) | 13 (55) | 14 (57) | 16 (61) | 11 (51) |
| Average precipitation mm (inches) | 53.5 (2.11) | 22.7 (0.89) | 47.5 (1.87) | 18 (0.7) | 16.9 (0.67) | 3 (0.1) | 1 (0.0) | 12.8 (0.50) | 7.6 (0.30) | 29.2 (1.15) | 63.2 (2.49) | 63.9 (2.52) | 339.3 (13.3) |
| Average rainy days | 11 | 7 | 9 | 6 | 4 | 2 | 10 | 0 | 2 | 2 | 13 | 13 | 79 |
Source 1: My Weather 2
Source 2: World Weather Online

=== Flora and fauna ===
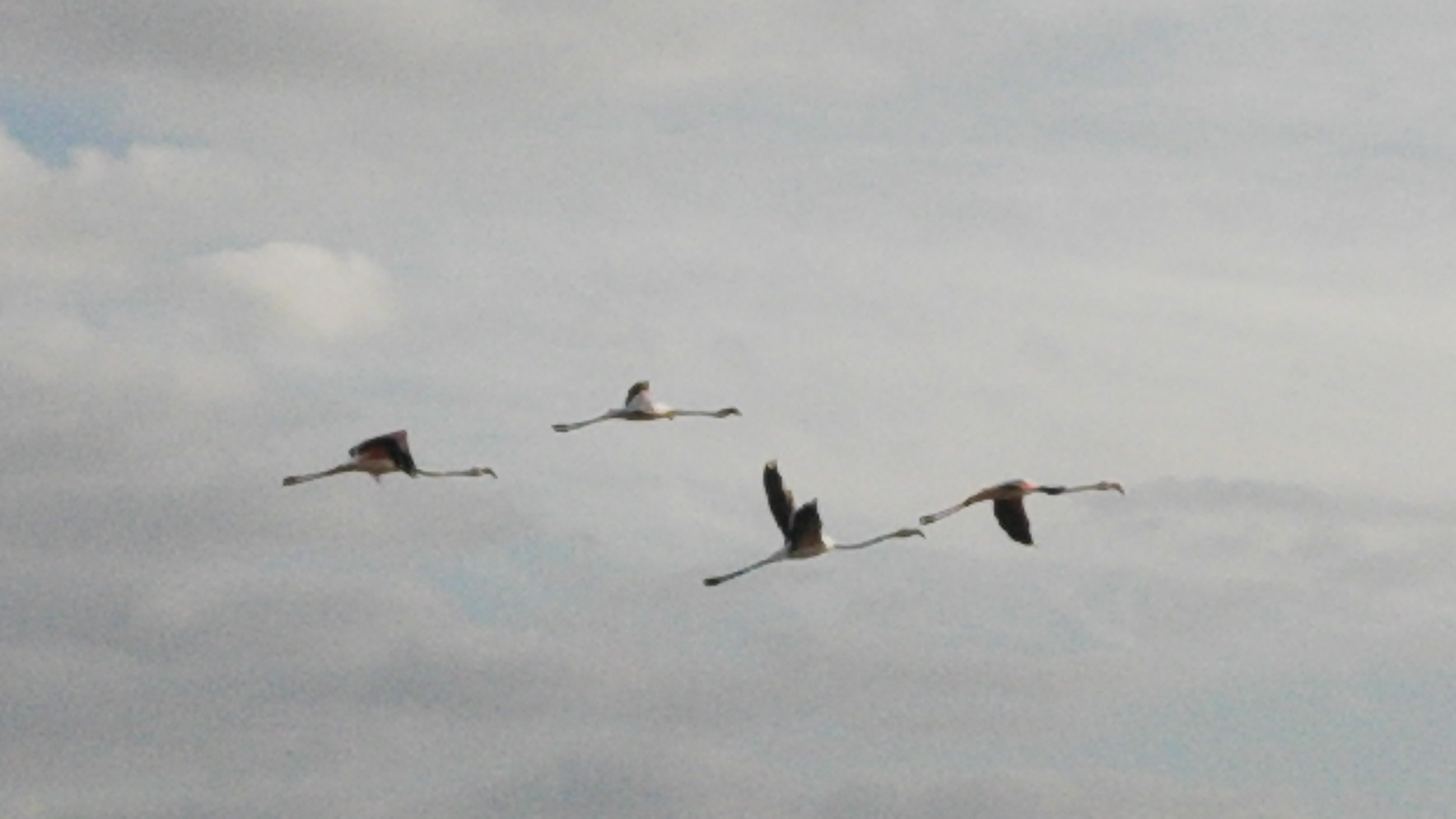
Flamingos over Lakeview

Welkom is situated on two vegetation units, the Western Free State Clay Grassland and Vaal-Vet Sandy Grassland, these are differentiated by soil types, rainfall and frost. The dominant grass species are Hyparrhenia hirta, Themeda triandra, Sporobolus pyramidalis, Eragrostis sp, Aristida sp, and other grasses and herbs. Trees and shrubs are infrequent due to heavy frost in the winter months.

The grasslands surrounding Welkom also include small mammal communities of yellow mongoose, ground squirrel, Cape porcupine, African mole-rat, pouched mouse, large-eared mouse, four-stripe grass mouse, and multimammate mouse. The De Rust Private Nature Reserve is situated about 25 km from Welkom on the Kroonstad road and is registered with the Free State Department of Nature Conservation.

=== Local geology: gold-bearing reefs ===
Welkom is located on the south-western corner of the Witwatersrand Basin. This basin is situated on the Kaapvaal craton, is filled by a 6-kilometre thick succession of sedimentary rocks, which extends laterally for hundreds of kilometres.

==== The De Bron Fault ====
The Free State Goldfields are divided into two sections, cut by the north–south striking De Bron Fault. This major structure has a vertical displacement of about 1500 m as well as a lateral shift of 4 km. A number of other major faults lie parallel to the De Bron Fault. Dips occur mostly towards the east, averaging 30 degrees but this becomes steeper approaching the De Bron Fault. To the east of the fault, a dip occurs towards the west at 20 degrees, although structurally complex dips of up to 40 degrees have also been measured. Between these two blocks, lies the uplifted horst block of the West Rand Group of sediments with no reef preserved.

The western margin area is bound by synclines and reverse thrusts faults and is structurally complex. Towards the south and east, reefs sub-crop against overlying strata, eventually cutting out against the Karoo to the east of the area. Most of the ore resource tends to be concentrated in reef bands located on one or two distinct unconformities. Mining has taken place as mostly deep-level underground, exploiting the narrow, generally shallow dipping tabular reefs.

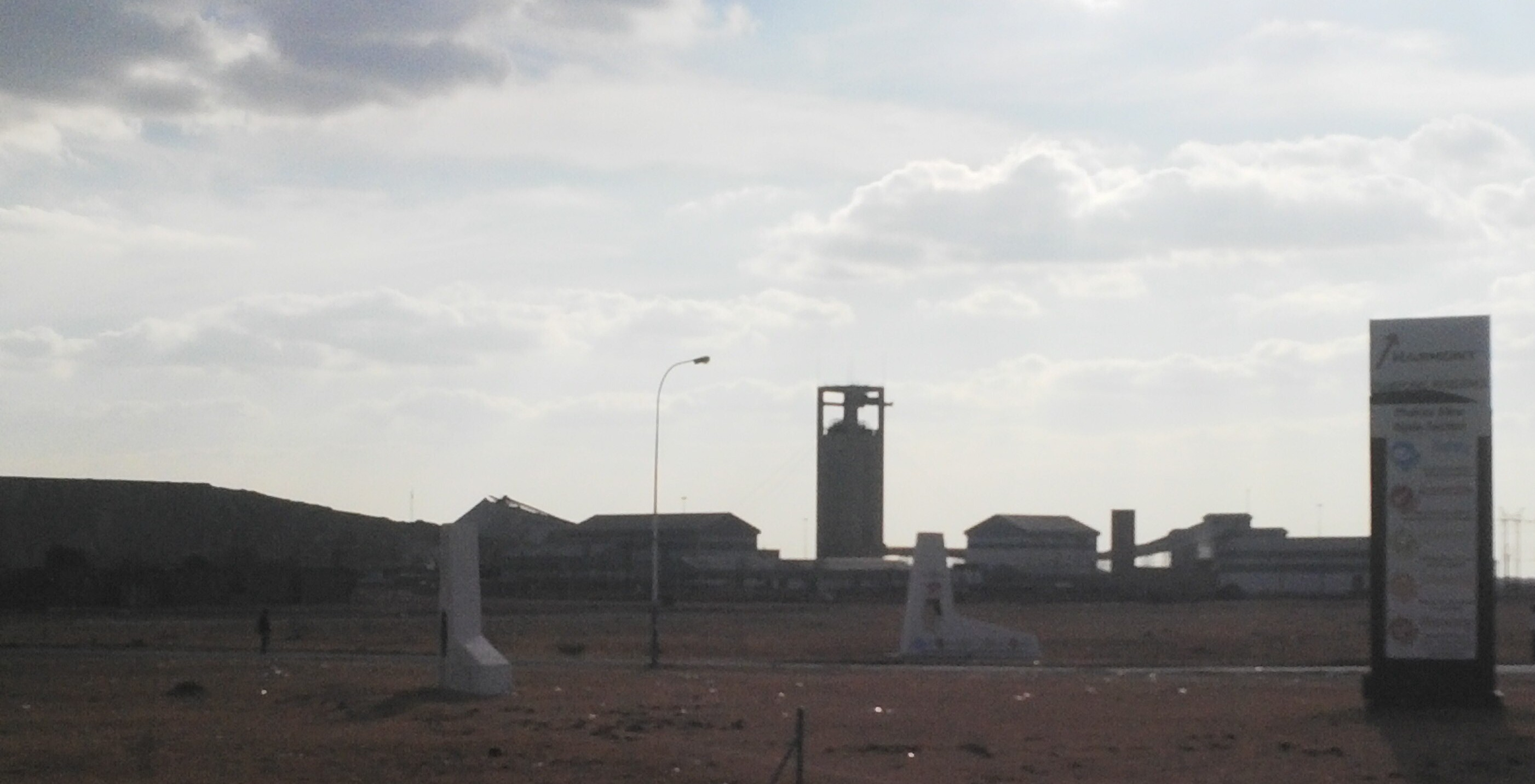
Harmony Gold Mine shaft on the R30 road

==== Basal Reef ====
The Basal Reef, is the most common reef horizon. It varies from a single pebble lag to channels of more than 2 m thick. It is commonly overlain by shale, which thickens northwards.

==== Leader Reef ====
The second major reef is the Leader Reef, located 15–20 m above the Basal Reef. This is mostly mined at shafts to the south. Further north, it becomes poorly developed with erratic grades. The reef consists of multiple conglomerate units, separated by thin quartzitic zones, often totalling up to 4 metres thick.

A selected mining cut on the most economic horizon is often undertaken. The B Reef is a highly channelised ore-body located 140 m stratigraphically above the Basal Reef. Within the channels, grades are excellent, but this falls away to nothing, outside of the channels. The A Reef is also a highly channelised reef, located some 40 m above the B Reef. It consists of multiple conglomerate bands of up to 4m thick and a selected mining cut is usually required to optimise the ore-body.

==== Fossils of Matjhabeng ====
A 2007 palaeontological study done in greater Matjhabeng began a programme of excavation of an early Pliocene locality. With an estimated age of 4.0–3.5 Ma, the locality also represents the only well-documented, river-deposited Pliocene locality in the central interior of southern Africa. After three years of excavation, a diverse fauna that includes fish, amphibians, reptiles, birds and mammals was recovered. Mammals ranged in size from rodents to mammoths, including an array of proboscideans, perissodactyls and artiodactyls, alongside rare carnivores.

In total, 29 taxa, including the oldest Ancylotherium and Megalotragus fossils in southern Africa were recovered. Some of the taxa from Matjhabeng are shared with Langebaanweg, and others with Makapansgat, confirming the intermediate status of this locality. Isotopic analysis revealed the earliest indication of extensive grasslands in South Africa, though these grasslands were part of an environmental mosaic that included significant woodland, and probable wetland, components.

== Demographics ==
According to the 2011 census, Welkom proper had a population of 64,130 people in an area of 167.55 square kilometres (64.69 sq mi), a population density of 382.76 inhabitants per square kilometre (991.3/sq mi). 60.7% of the inhabitants described themselves as "Black African", 26.9% as "White", 11.1% as "Coloured" and 0.9% as "Indian or Asian".

== Economy ==
=== Mining ===
==== Gold and uranium ====
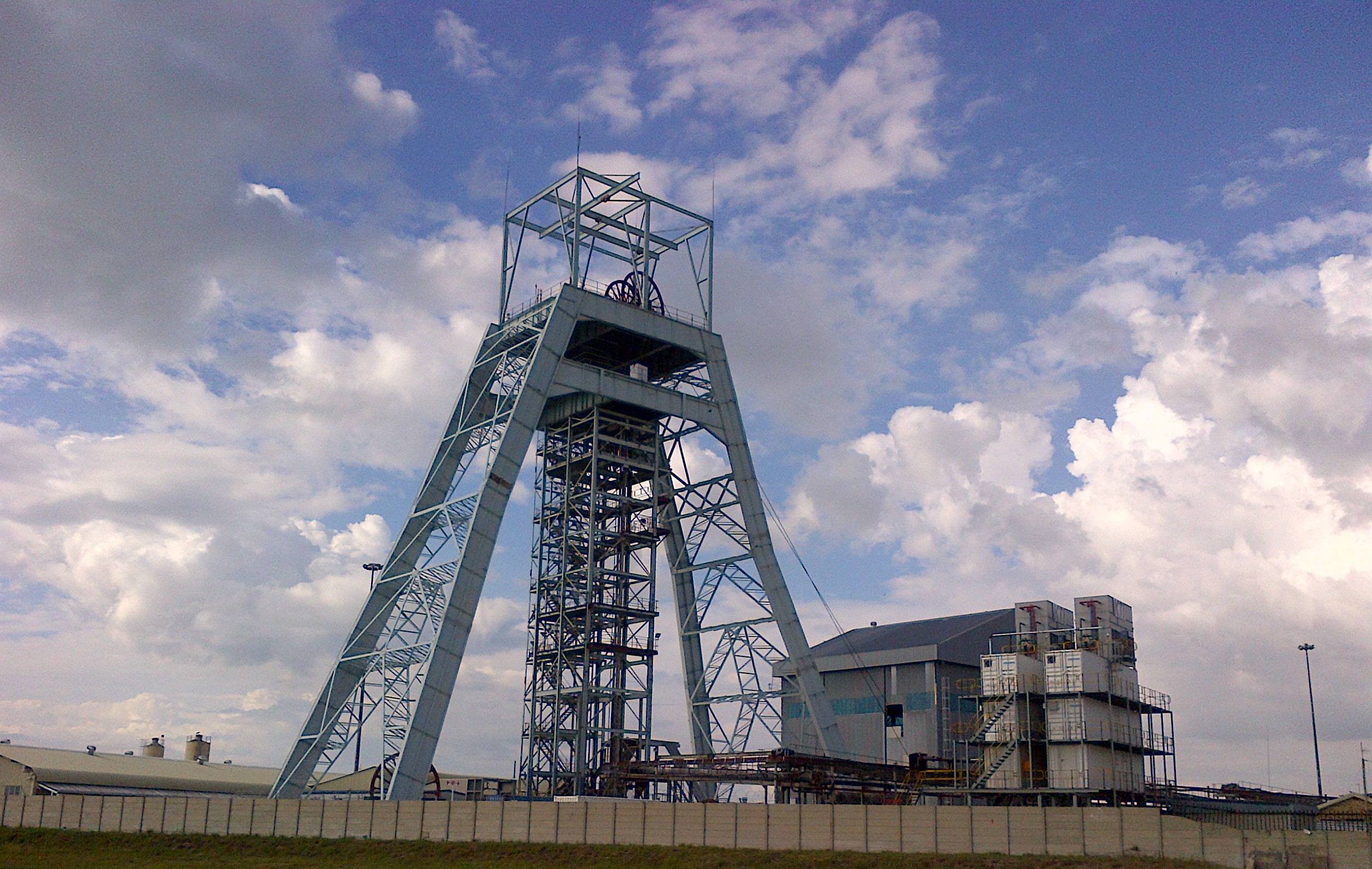
Harmony Phakisa shaft

Welkom's economy centres on the mining of gold and uranium and is the hub of the Free State Goldfields. Welkom has contributed 21% to the free world's gold sales. The city and immediate surroundings are dominated by the headgears and reduction plants of several gold and uranium mining companies, including St Helena, Unisel, Welkom, Western Holdings, Free State Geduld, President Brand, President Steyn, Erfdeel Dankbaarheid, Phakisa, and Tshepong.

===== Tailings Reclamation =====
Central Plant Reclamation (CPR): Located near Welkom, this plant was converted into a tailings retreatment facility in 2017. It reprocesses tailings from storage facilities to extract gold, with a projected operation life of approximately 11 years. Tailings have also proven problematic. The court case, Prozel 105 CC v Freegold (Harmony) (2023) involved a commercial farmer owning land adjacent to Harmony’s operations who sued for soil and water contamination caused by runoff and seepage from tailings dams.

===== Recent discoveries =====
In Sept 2016 Harmony Gold and its partner White Rivers Exploration declared an as to then unknown gold ore body near the current Target shaft. This resource is estimated to have a mine life of about 30 years.

==== Coal ====
Welkom also has significant coal reserves. The Theunissen coal field is located in the districts of Theunissen and Bultfontein, only some 12 km to the south of Welkom. The section of the reserve able to be mined covers an area of more than 23,500 hectares.

==== Diamonds ====
Located about 7.5 km from Welkom, a kimberlite pipe, was discovered in 1890 and mined from a single shaft until the start of the Boer War in 1899. Mining continued after the war until a major aquifer, which was encountered at a depth of 259m, forced the mine to close. It was eventually re-opened by Samada Diamonds Pty Ltd and closed again in the early 1990s.

Petra Diamonds operated the Star mine, a fissure 40 km south of Welkom. The Star mine was renowned for its consistent production of high value diamonds. In 2013, Petra commenced a disposal process of its Fissure Mines portfolio. This process did not result in any acceptable offers for the mines and Star was subsequently placed into care and maintenance.

==== Other minerals ====
Other minerals found in the Welkom vicinity include calcite, iridium, isoferroplatinum, muscovite, pyrophylite, rutile and uranite.

=== Industry ===
Due to the declining gold price in the nineties, the manufacturing industry was promoted as a further means to support the local economy. Heavy machinery support for mining can be found in the Voorspoed area. Various other maintenance industries and services are well founded in Welkom which include engineering, and mechanical repairs.

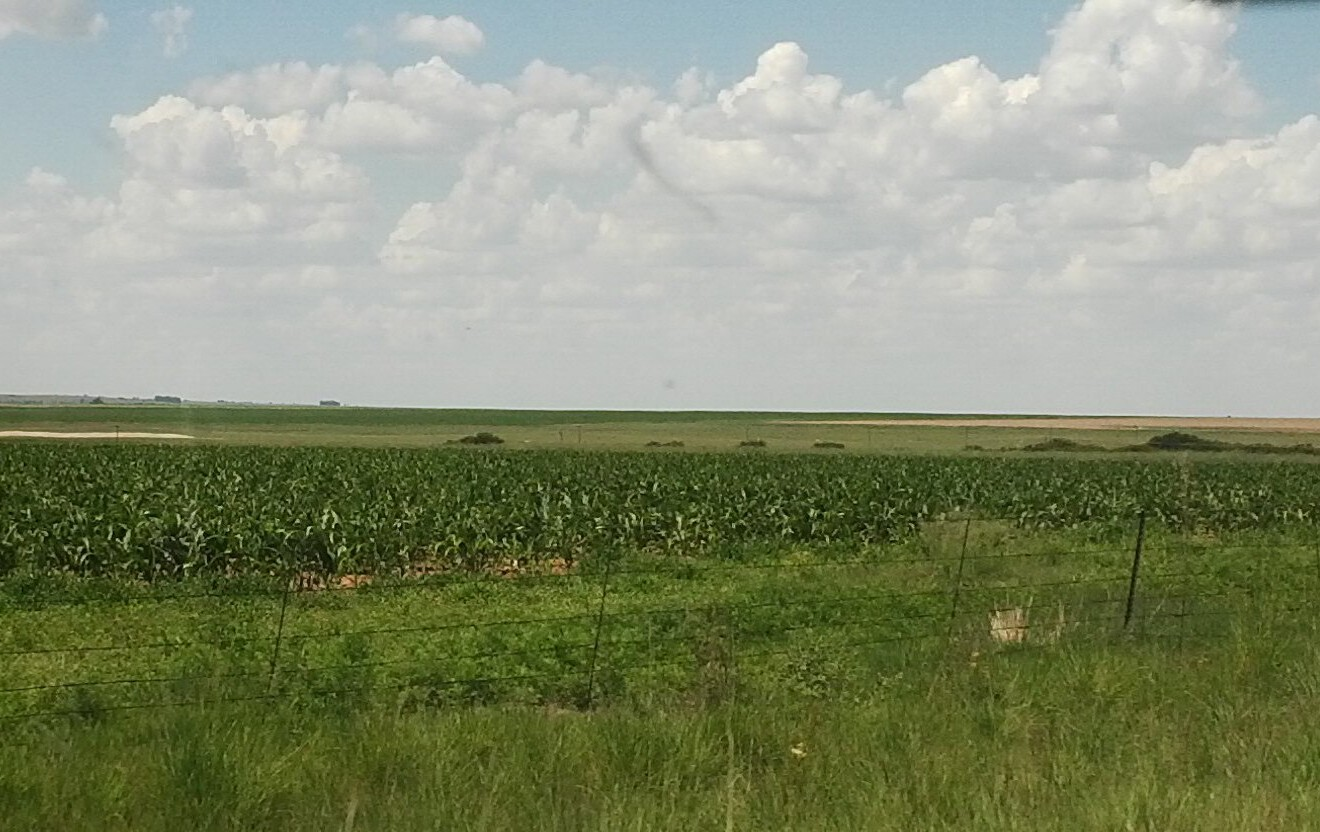
Maize production near the R34 leading into Welkom

Welkom produces goods such as steel, lumber, dairy products, and beef.

The city also hosts several major industries such as Coca-Cola and South African Breweries.

=== Agriculture ===
The high water table in the north-western part of the district makes it very suitable for maize production and should remain an important maize producing area. The district is mostly covered by non-arable, moderate potential grazing land as well as marginal potential arable land. The Welkom region forms part of the Maize Triangle, which stretches over three of South Africa's provinces. The region is also a major producer of sunflowers, poultry and beef cattle.

=== Renewable Energy ===
Several large-scale solar power projects are currently under development or construction in the Welkom area as part of a significant renewable energy push in the Free State, with at least five major projects/clusters identified in recent reports.

Key solar projects and clusters around Welkom include:

- Khauta Solar PV Project/Cluster (NOA Group): Located about 10km-30km north of Welkom, this is a major project consisting of at least two large sites—the 349MW Khauta South and 157MW Khauta West—making it one of the largest in the country.
- Grootspruit Solar Plant (Engie): A 75 MW solar PV plant, with construction announced in mid-2024.
- Springbok Solar Farm (SOLA Group): Located in the Welkom area, this project reached significant construction milestones in 2025.
- Naos 1 and Nyala Solar/Storage Projects (SOLA Group): Part of a "mega-scale" 506 MW cluster involving storage and wheeling capabilities, located in the vicinity.
- Virginia Solar Farm: Located near Welkom, with active construction and testing reported in 2025.

=== Gas exploration ===
The area around Welkom has become a hub for the Virginia Gas project This project, spans approximately 187,000 hectares across Welkom, Virginia, and Theunissen. The LNG gas fields here contain some of the highest helium concentrations recorded globally. While typical wells elsewhere might have 0.04% to 0.5% helium, wells in this project average over 3%, with some reaching as high as 12%.

== Sport ==
=== Motor-sports ===
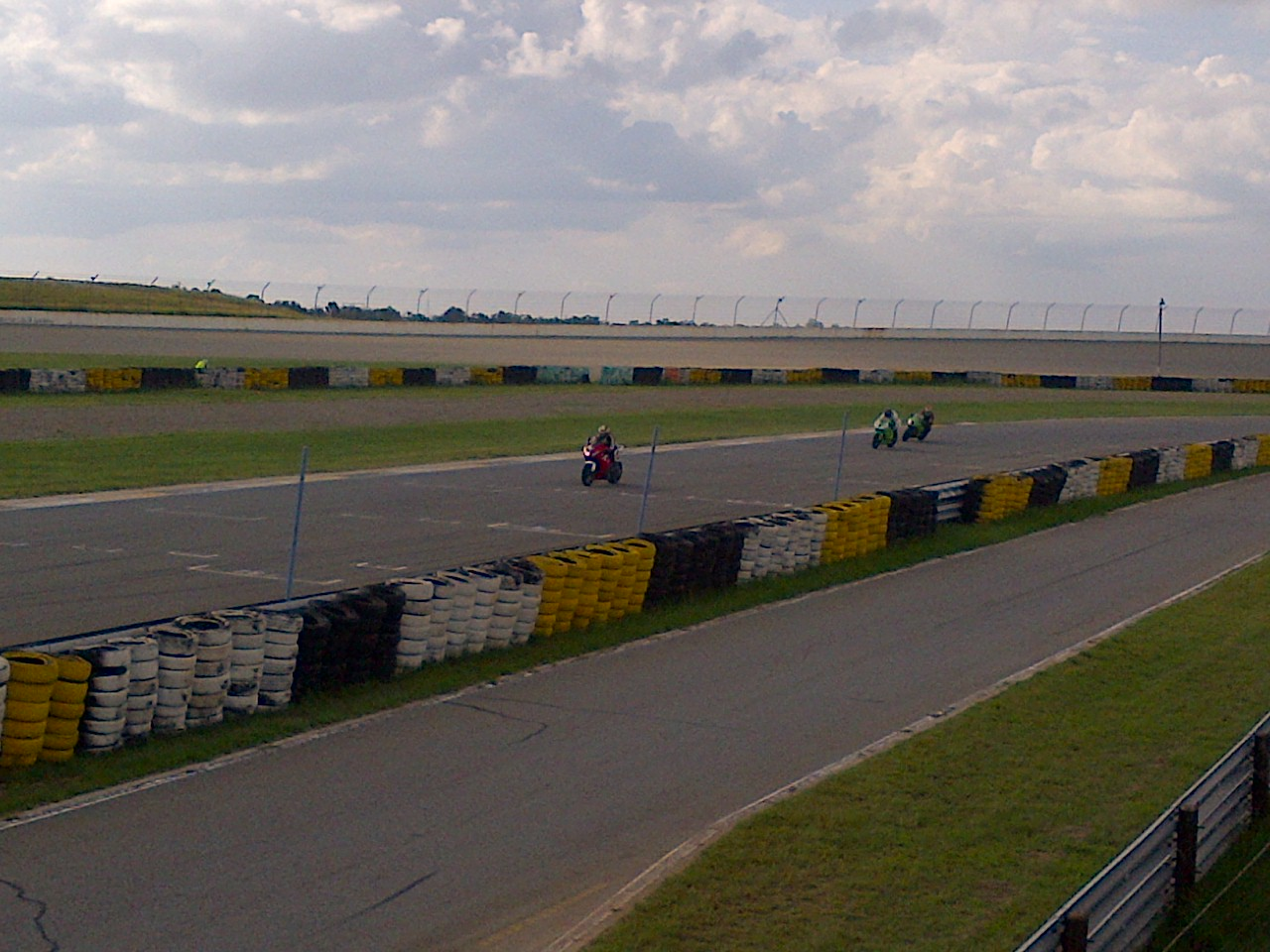
Motorcycle racing at Phakisa Freeway

Welkom's most notable sport feature is the multi-million Rand Phakisa Freeway situated between Welkom and Odendaalsrus, which opened in 1999. Phakisa Freeway is an international standard, multi-purpose motor sport facility. The track features a 4,24 km road course as well as a 2,4 km banked oval track similar to the Las Vegas Motor Speedway in Nevada, United States. It is one of the few oval speedways outside of the United States and the only one in Africa.

The circuit hosted MotoGP's South African motorcycle Grand Prix from 1999 to 2004.

=== Soccer ===
Harmony F.C.'s homeground is the Zuka Baloyi Stadium, a multi-sport facility, that is currently mostly used for soccer. Another soccer stadium is Vuyo Charles Stadium which was formerly known as Thabong Stadium.

=== Rugby ===
The Griffons Rugby Union was formed in 1968 when the late Dr Danie Craven, then the President of SA Rugby spread the game to rural areas in South Africa, Welkom was one of four new provinces formed and called North-Free State.

=== Gliding ===
Welkom's airport is also used on a regular basis for gliding championships on a National and International basis.

=== Stadia and other sports facilities ===
- North West Stadium
- Zuka Baloyi Stadium

== Parks and greenspace ==
- Central Park
- Peter Pan Park
- Van Riebeeck Park
- West Park

== Education ==
Welkom has a well established education system with some schools reaching their 60-year anniversary. Some prominent schools include:

=== Secondary education ===
List of secondary schools
- St Andrews – established in 1963
- St Dominic's College
- Welkom High – established in 1954
- Welkom-Gimnasium – established in 1953
- Welkom Islamic
- Edmund Rice Combined
- Adamsonvlei Combined
- Dunamis Christian
- Vierhoek Combined
- Riebeeckstad Hoërskool
- Goudveld Hoërskool
- Unitas
- Leseding Technical School
- Riebeeckstad High School
- Kingdom Academy
- Edu-College
- Rheederpark High School
- Welkom Secondary
- Paballong Combined
- Welkom Secondary school
- Lenakeng Comprehensive
- Lebokgang Secondary
- Thotagauta Secondary
- Lekgarietse Secondary
- Teto High
- Lephola Secondary
- Letsete Secondary
- Nanabolela Secondary
- Welkom Technical High(H.T.S) – established in 1961

=== Special needs schools ===
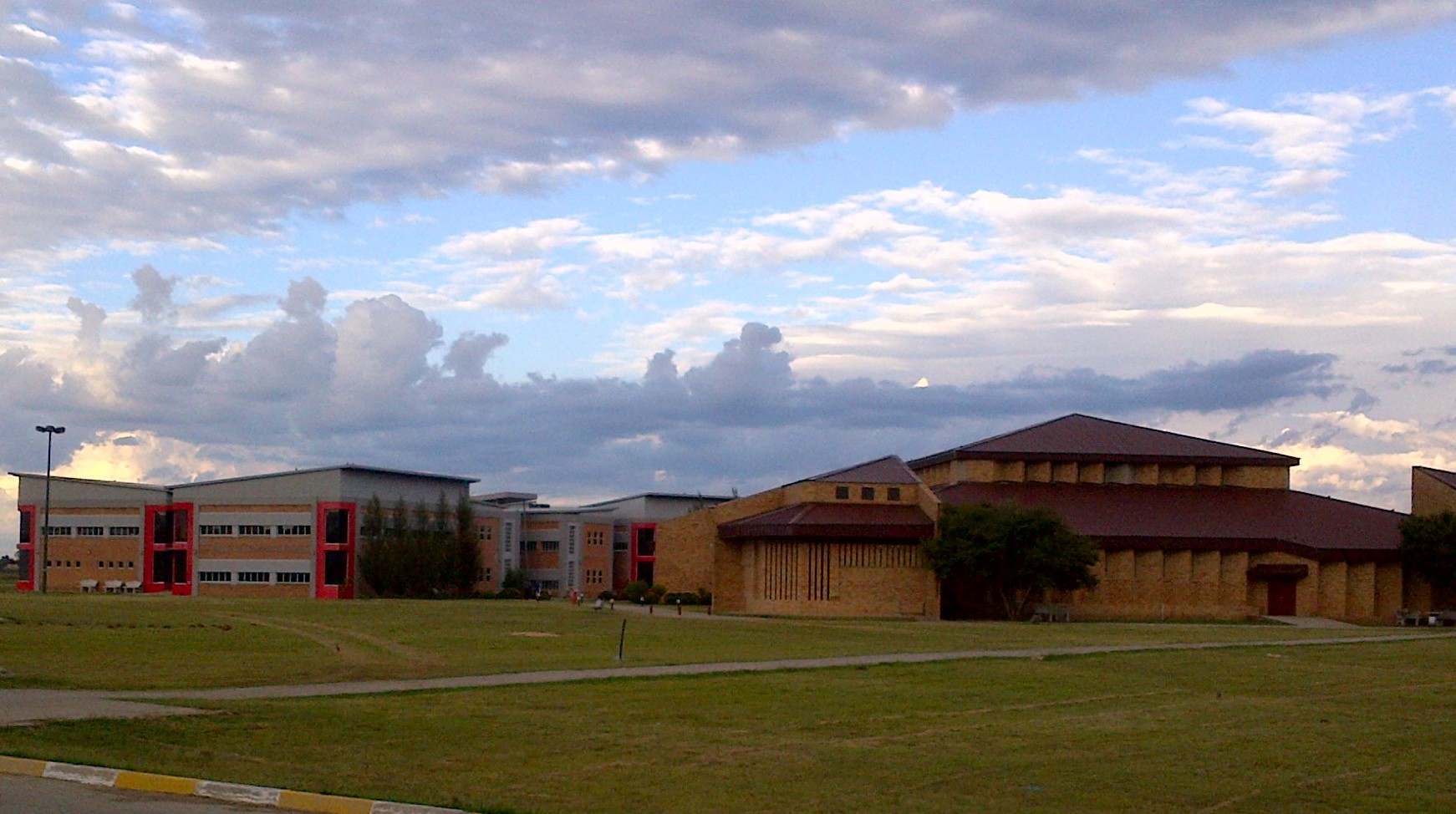
Campus of the Central University of Technology

- Amari for mentally handicapped
- St Vincenzo School for the Deaf (located at St. Dominic's Catholic Church)
- Orion (Formerly Japie smit)
- Leboneng Special School

=== Tertiary education ===
- Welkom Technical College
- Welkom Technological Institute
- Welkom Nursing College
- FET College Goldfields – geared towards employment opportunities
- Central University of Technology, Free State (CUT) satellite campus – is also situated in Welkom. CUT's core competencies are in science, engineering, and technology.

== Infrastructure ==
=== Transportation ===
==== Road ====
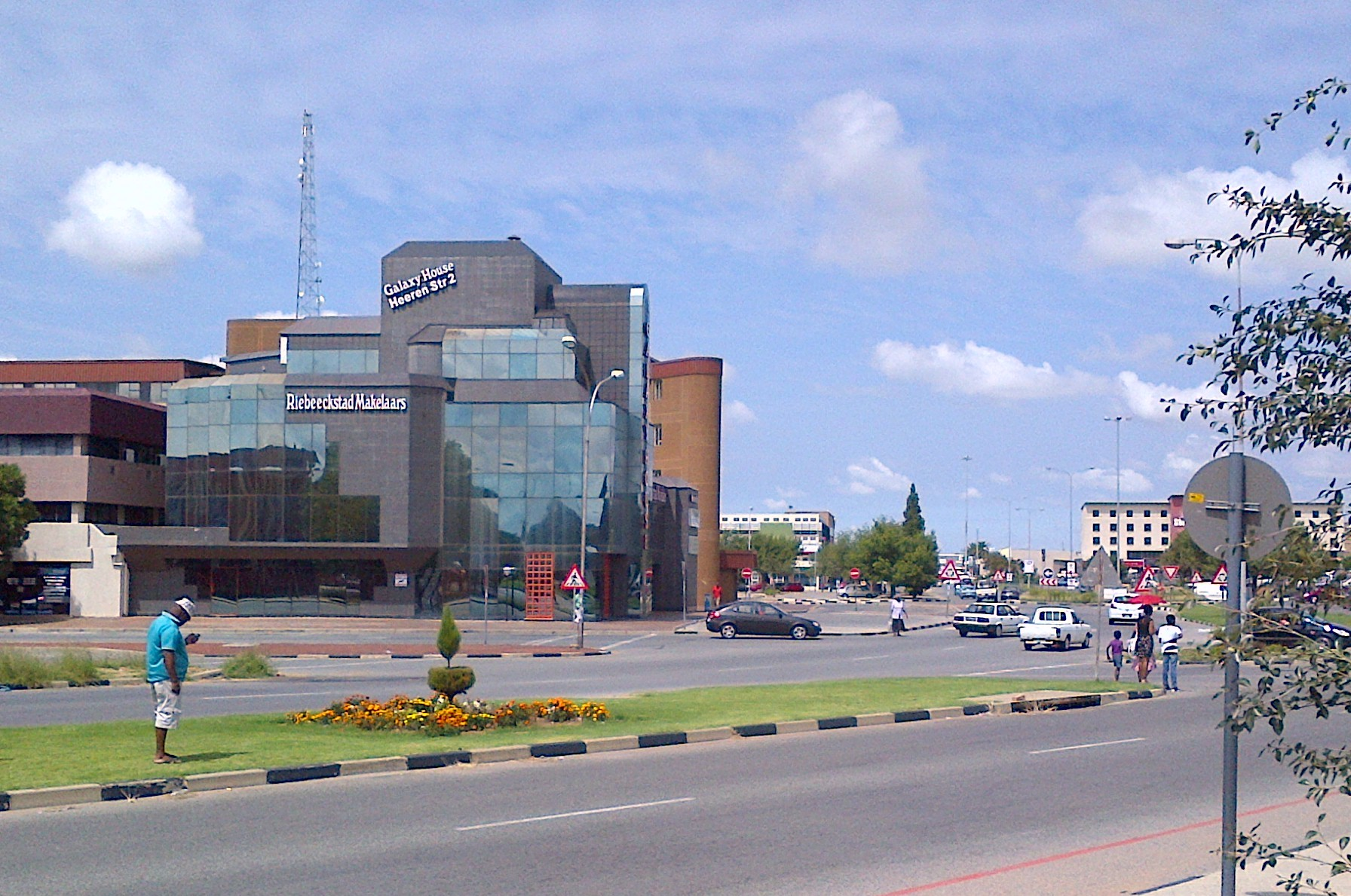
Buiten Street, Welkom

Welkom is connected to Kroonstad to the north-east by the R730 and the R34. It is also connected to Brandfort and Bloemfontein in the south and to Bothaville and Klerksdorp in the north by the R30.

Welkom is connected to Bultfontein to the south-west by the R710 and to Virginia and Winburg in the south-east by the R73.

==== Rail ====
There is a goods rail link with Hennenman to the main Johannesburg – Bloemfontein line. Trains from there go to Johannesburg and Cape Town.

==== Air ====
Welkom is served by a small airport. There are no scheduled flights.

=== Health systems ===
Welkom hosts a number of public and private hospitals as well as several specialised clinics:

- Bongani Regional Hospital (Public)
- Ernest Oppenheimer Hospital (Semi-private) (reopened, now called the RH Matjhabeng Hospital)
- Mediclinic Welkom (Private)
- St Helena Hospital (Private, Closed down)
- Rand Mutual Care Hospital (New: Opened on 16 April 2016)

Various hospices also exist. Thabong and Bronville also host various primary care clinics.

== Notable people ==
- Mark Richard Shuttleworth – entrepreneur, cosmonaut, and founder of Canonical Ltd.
- Judy Croome (née Heinemann) – author and poet, matriculated Welkom High School (1975)
- Rev Stephen Brislin – Roman Catholic Archbishop of Cape Town, born in Welkom on 24 September 1956.

=== Sportspeople ===
- Dricus Du Plessis – mixed martial artist, UFC Former Middleweight Champion
- Jan Hendrik de Beer (Jannie) – Springbok rugby player
- Wynand Olivier – Springbok rugby player
- Khwezi Mkhafu-rugby player
- Hannes Strydom – Springbok rugby player
- Bradley Moolman – rugby player
- C.J. van der Linde – Springbok rugby player
- Joubert Horn – rugby player
- Jandré Marais – rugby player, who matriculated at Welkom-Gimnasium
- Peet Marais – rugby player, who matriculated at Welkom-Gimnasium
- Dewald Pretorius – rugby player
- Franco Mostert – Springbok rugby player
- Louis Strydom – rugby player
- Lerato Manzini – professional footballer for Bloemfontein Celtic in the Premiership
- Mosa Lebusa – professional footballer for Ajax Cape Town in the Premiership
- Paseka Sekese – professional footballer for Bidvest Wits in the Premiership
- Gerard Louis Brophy – cricketer
- Brian Mervin McMillan – won South African Cricket Annual Cricketer of the Year awards in 1991 and 1996
- Dean Elgar – Protea cricketer. On 11 March 2017, against New Zealand he became the first South African opener to face 200 or more ball in both innings of a Test.
- Thandi Tshabalala
- Seabelo Senatla – professional rugby player
- Elinda Vorster (Rademeyer) – South African athlete who competed for South Africa to reach the semi-finals of the Women's 200 metres event at the 1992 Summer Olympics inside the Estadi Olimpic de Montjuic in Barcelona, Spain in August 1992, who matriculated at Welkom-Gimnasium
- Linda Olivier – South African women cricketer and golfer, who matriculated at Welkom-Gimnasium
- Gerrie Sonnekus – Springbok rugby player, who matriculated at Welkom-Gimnasium
- Lukas van Biljon – Springbok rugby player, who matriculated at Welkom-Gimnasium
- Zarck Visser – South African long jumper (Athletics) – silver medal at 2014 Commonwealth Games in Glasgow, Scotland, who matriculated at Welkom-Gimnasium
- Christo Ferreira – Springbok rugby player, who matriculated at Welkom-Gimnasium
- Jaco van Zyl – South African golfer, who matriculated at Welkom-Gimnasium
