= R730 (South Africa) =

Road in Free State, South Africa

Regional route R730

Route information
- Maintained by SANRAL
- Length: 40.4 km (25.1 mi)

Major junctions
- South end: R30 near Welkom
- R73 in Welkom; R70 in Welkom
- North end: R34 near Odendaalsrus

Location
- Country: South Africa

Highway system
- Numbered routes of South Africa
← R727	→ M1

The R730 is a Regional Route in Free State, South Africa. The entire 40-kilometre route is part of the ZR Mahabane Toll Route maintained by the South African National Roads Agency, which goes from Bloemfontein to Kroonstad (an alternative route to the N1 national route). Although there are no tollgates on this stretch at the moment, it is labelled as a toll road to the near public and to motorists using the road (indicated on road signage).

It begins south of Welkom at an off-ramp junction with the R30 road (which takes over as the ZR Mahabane Highway to Bloemfontein) and ends east of Odendaalsrus at a t-junction with the R34 road (which takes over as the ZR Mahabane Highway to Kroonstad).

== Route ==
Its northern terminus is at a t-junction with the R34 road east of Odendaalsrus. It heads south into Welkom as a dual carriageway and after 5 kilometres, it meets the R70 road at a 4-way junction. After another 2 kilometres, as the dual carriageway proceeds southwards towards Welkom Central, the R730 becomes the road to the south-south-east towards Thabong.

Just after leaving the dual carriageway, it encounters a roundabout west of the Riebeeckstad suburb and encounters another roundabout 1.5 kilometres later, which marks its entrance into Thabong. It passes through Thabong southwards for 3.5 kilometres (with one off-ramp junction) before reaching an intersection with the R73 road coming from the centre of Welkom.

The R730 and the R73 join to become one road and form a dual carriageway southwards. They are one road for 10 kilometres before the R73 becomes its own road eastwards just north of Virginia, heading towards Winburg, while the R730 continues southwards on the dual carriageway. The R730 continues for another 22 kilometres south-south-west, crossing the Sand River (where it becomes a single carriageway, still with 2 lanes in each direction), to reach its southern terminus where it meets the R30 road south of Welkom (south-west of Virginia). The R30 takes over the single carriageway here.

The entire route is designated as a toll road (although there are no tollgates) and maintained by the South African National Roads Agency.
