= Hoopstad =

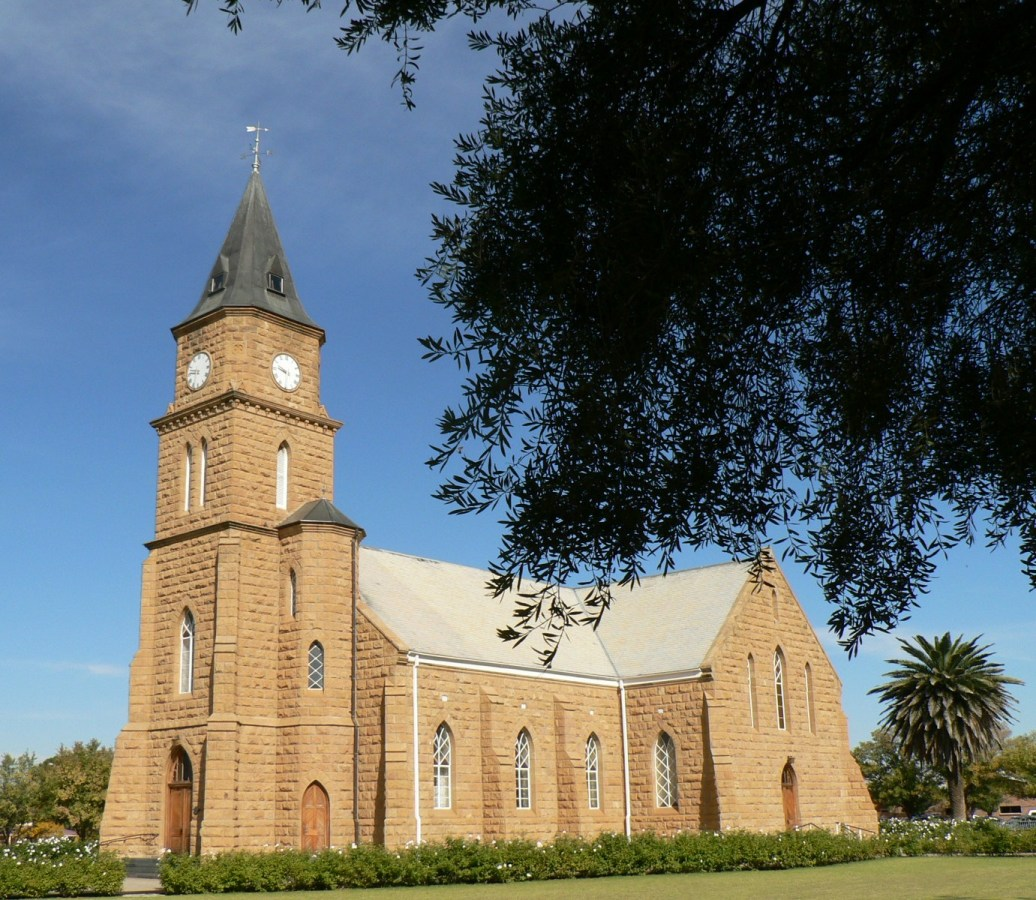
- Hoopstad Church

- Location within Free State (South African province) Location within South Africa
- Coordinates: 27°50′S 25°55′E
- Country: South Africa
- Province: Free State
- District: Lejweleputswa
- Municipality: Tswelopele
- Established: 1873

Area
  - Total: 27.8 km^{2} (10.7 sq mi)

Population (2011)
  - Total: 89,917
  - Density: 3,230/km^{2} (8,380/sq mi)

Racial makeup (2011)
  - Black African: 30%
  - Coloured: 1.9%
  - Indian/Asian: 1.2%
  - White: 66%
  - Other: 1.7%

First languages (2011)
  - Sotho: 3.7%
  - English: 3.1%
  - Tswana: 1.6%
  - Afrikaans: 86.8%
  - Other: 4.8%
- Time zone: UTC+2 (SAST)
- Postal code (street): 9479
- PO box: 9479
- Area code: 053

Hoopstad is a town situated at the intersection of the R34, R59 & R700 in the Free State Province. This area is considered to be the richest maize-producing district in South Africa. The town is located near the Bloemhof Dam which is situated on the Vaal River. The Sandveld Nature Reserve is positioned alongside the Bloemhof Dam. Hopetown and Hoopstad are two different towns and are often confused.

== History and activities ==
The town of Hoopstad was initially founded in 1876 and named Hauptstad after Mr Haupt, a surveyor. The translation of Hauptstad into Afrikaans means Capital, which it clearly wasn't and the town was therefore renamed Hoopstad. The town, whose name means "Hope City" in Afrikaans, was established on the one side of the large farm Kameeldoorns, with another town Bultfontein on the other side.

== See also ==
- Hoopstad (House of Assembly of South Africa constituency), which existed from 1910 to 1948
