= Bultfontein =

- Location within Free State (South African province) Location within South Africa
- Coordinates: 28°17′13″S 26°09′02″E
- Country: South Africa
- Province: Free State
- District: Lejweleputswa
- Municipality: Tswelopele
- Established: 1873

Area
  - Total: 44.0 km^{2} (17.0 sq mi)

Population (2011)
  - Total: 23,365
  - Density: 531/km^{2} (1,380/sq mi)

Racial makeup (2011)
  - Black African: 93.3%
  - Coloured: 0.5%
  - Indian/Asian: 0.5%
  - White: 5.5%
  - Other: 0.2%

First languages (2011)
  - Sotho: 56.7%
  - Xhosa: 22.7%
  - Tswana: 9.5%
  - Afrikaans: 6.1%
  - Other: 5.0%
- Time zone: UTC+2 (SAST)
- Postal code (street): 9670
- PO box: 9670
- Area code: 051

Bultfontein is a town in the Free State province of South Africa with a total population of about 23,400 people. It is situated in the Tswelopele Local Municipality, about 100 kilometres (60 mi) north of Bloemfontein. The town site was laid out in 1873; it had been delayed because of a location dispute which also led to the establishment of Hoopstad 55 kilometres (35 mi) to the north-west. The township of Phahameng was established on the outskirts of Bultfontein in the 1970s.

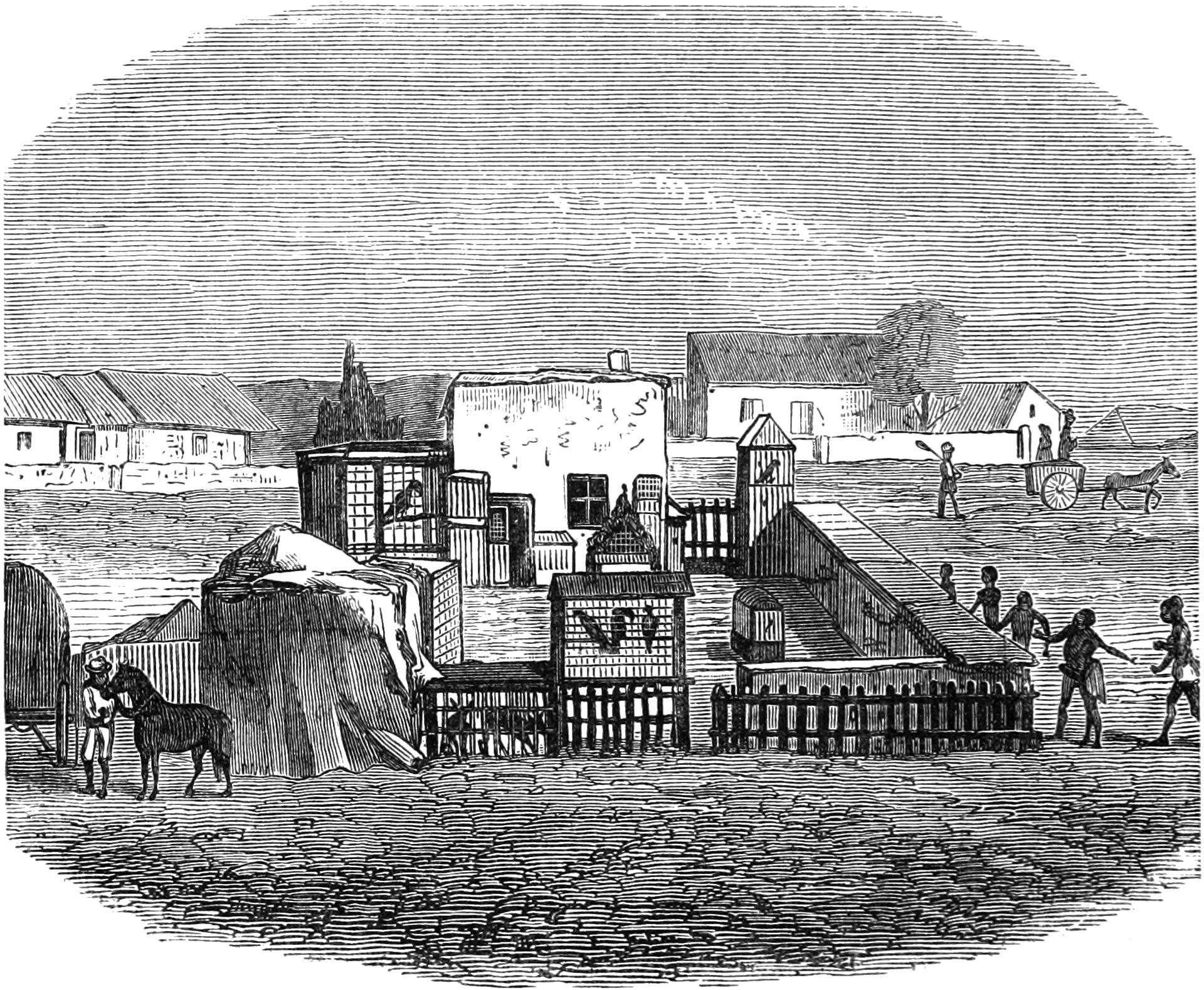
Emil Holub's house in Bultfontein in 1870s

According to the 2011 census, Bultfontein proper has a population of 2,176, while Phahameng has a population of 21,189, giving the urban area a total population of 23,365. Of this population 93% described themselves as Black African, 5.5% as White, and 0.5% as Coloured. 57% spoke Sotho as their home language, 23% spoke Xhosa, 9.5% spoke Tswana and 6% spoke Afrikaans as first language.

Bultfontein has 8 public schools. Two are high schools, three are combined schools, and three are primary schools. The town is 60 km away from Welkom and 80 km away from Bloemfontein. It has several retail stores.
