= Bothaville =

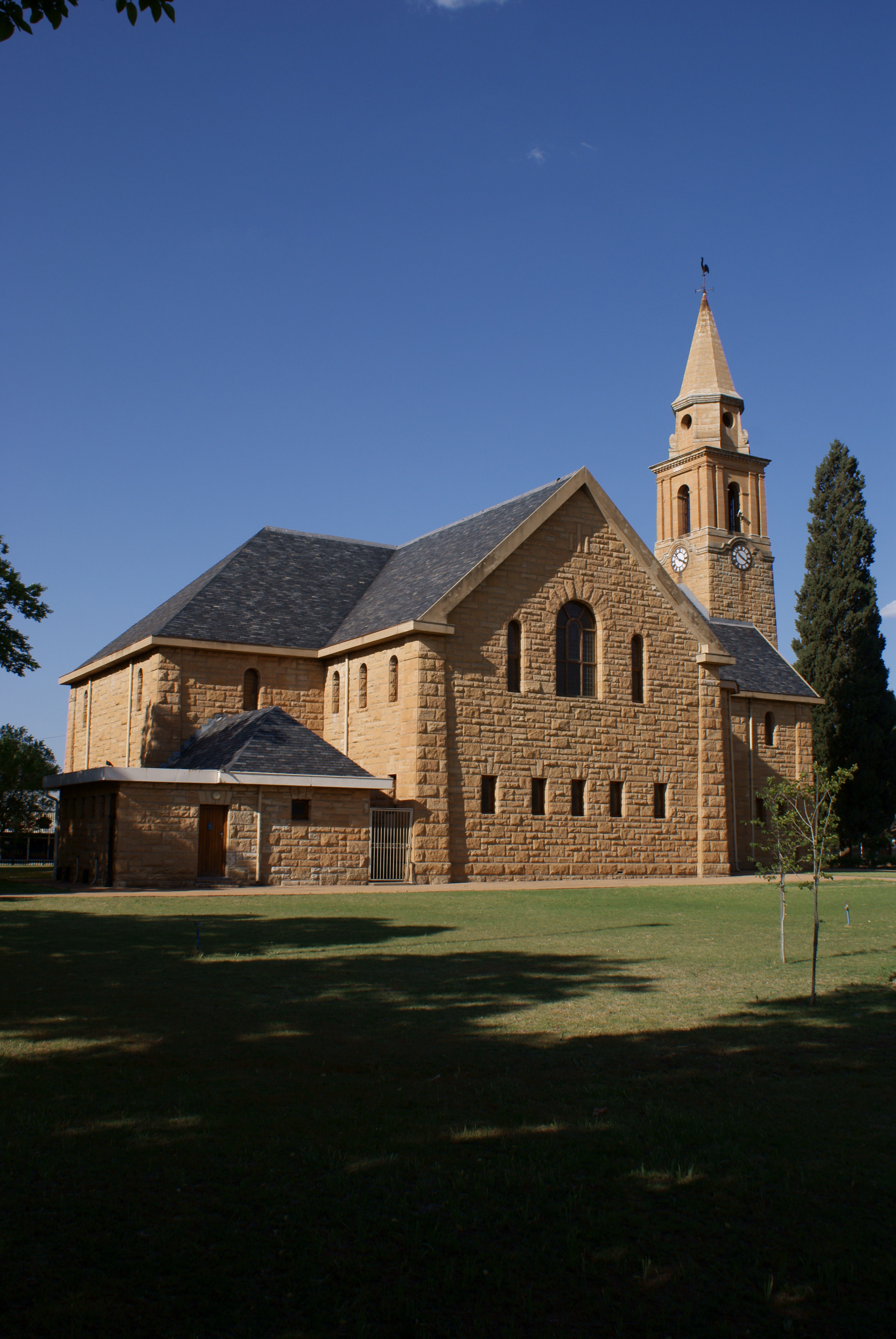
- Bothaville Church

- Location within Free State (South African province) Location within South Africa
- Coordinates: 27°23′S 26°37′E
- Country: South Africa
- Province: Free State
- District: Lejweleputswa
- Municipality: Nala
- Established: 1889

Area
  - Total: 43.0 km^{2} (16.6 sq mi)

Population (2011)
  - Total: 46,030
  - Density: 1,070/km^{2} (2,770/sq mi)

Racial makeup (2011)
  - Black African: 93.8%
  - Coloured: 0.6%
  - Indian/Asian: 0.2%
  - White: 5.1%
  - Other: 0.3%

First languages (2011)
  - Sotho: 72.9%
  - Xhosa: 9.1%
  - Afrikaans: 6.5%
  - Tswana: 3.9%
  - Other: 7.7%
- Time zone: UTC+2 (SAST)
- Postal code (street): 9660
- PO box: 9660
- Area code: 056

Bothaville is a maize farming town situated near the Vaal River in the Lejweleputswa DM of the Free State province, South Africa. It is situated 60 km east of the Vaal, on the bank of its Vals River tributary. Bothaville and the adjacent Kgotsong township have a total of approximately 46,000 residents.

The indigenous Sesotho name for the town is Mophate, which is the name of a clay pot used when traveling.

== History ==
A 'church town', Botharnia, was established in 1891 on a portion of Gladdedrift farm, by Voortrekker JP van Wyk who left Pretoria after religious persecution. The town was renamed Bothaville in 1893, after Theunis Louis Botha, the original owner of the farm.

The Battle of Doornkraal took place some distance south of town on 6 November 1900. Doornkraal Monument is a granite memorial built in honour of Boers who died here in the surprise attack by British soldiers. Some of the Boer soldiers were buried in a communal grave.

The town received municipal status in 1914. It was recently amalgamated into the Nala Local Municipality, along with Wesselsbron and a part of the Vetvaal rural council.

=== Wall of Remembrance ===
In NAMPO Park lies the Wall of Remembrance, a monument erected in 2007, in remembrance of all the commercial farmers and farm-workers who have died in farm-murders in South Africa since May 1961. The memorial consists of nine pillars, representing each province, and a statue of a farmer holding a Bible.

== Agriculture ==
Bothaville lies in the centre of the maize triangle, thus surrounded by vast maizelands, some irrigated from the Vals and Vaal Rivers. Other agricultural activities are sheep, sunflower, wheat and peanuts.

=== NAMPO Harvest Day ===
The NAMPO agricultural trade show, known as "Nampo Harvest Day" or "Nampo Oesdag", has been held annually at Bothaville since 1974. Described as one of the largest in the world, it attracted some 70,000 visitors in recent years. It is held in the middle week of May at Nampo Park just north of town. The show, organised by Grain South Africa (GSA), features a large variety of agricultural machinery and livestock.
