= Ethnic groups in South Africa =

Racial groups in South Africa (2022 census)
1. Black (81.5%)
2. Coloured (8.15%)
3. White (7.30%)
4. Indian/Asian (2.74%)
5. Other (0.39%)

Dominant population groups in South Africa. Black Coloured White Indian/Asian None dominant Little or no population

Ethnic groups in South Africa have a variety of origins. Racial categories were introduced by the post-colonial apartheid regime by legally classifying them according to racial categories . Today, the governing party of South Africa, the African National Congress (ANC) continues to classify the population as belonging to one of the four colonial-era constructed racial groups: Whites , Indians , Coloureds / Khoi-San and Bantu Black Africans.

The ANC government claims that using these categories is essential in order to identify and track the progress of Historically Disadvantaged Individuals (HDI) which are people who, before democratisation and the Constitution of the Republic of South Africa, 1993 (Act No. 200 of 1993), came into operation, were disadvantaged by unfair discrimination on the basis of race under the former colonial apartheid regime.

The National Census of 1996 was the 1st comprehensive national census by the ANC government, after the democratic transition. Statistics South Africa (SSA) provides the limited categories based on the classifications of the previous regime by which people must use to classify themselves, including a fifth category of "unspecified/other".

Population change by SSA census category
Category	1996	2001	2011	2022	Change
Black	76.7%	78.4%	79.2%	81.4%	2.2%
Coloured	10.9%	7.7%	8.9%	8.2%	−0.72%
White	8.9%	8.3%	8.9%	7.3%	−1.6%
Indian/Asian	2.6%	2.2%	2.5%	2.7%	0.2%
Other	No Data	No Data	0.5%	0.4%	−0.1%
Total population	40,600,000	44,819,778	51,770,560	62,027,503	14, 39%

Note: The 2022 South African census has been criticised for its inaccuracies, such as the overestimation of the Indian and White population.

== Black African South Africans ==
The majority population of South Africa are those who are Bantu Africans, who are culturally and linguistically heterogeneous. They include Zulu, Xhosa, BaPedi (North Sotho), BaTswana, BaSotho (South Sotho), Tsonga, Swazi, Venda and South Ndebele people, all of whom are represented in the languages of South Africa. According to the 2022 census, the twelve official languages according to usage are: isiZulu 24.4%, isiXhosa 16.3%, Afrikaans 10.6%, English 8.7%, Sepedi 10.0%, Setswana 8.3%, Sesotho 7.8%, Xitsonga 4.7%, siSwati 2.8%, Tshivenda 2.5%, isiNdebele 1.7% and South African Sign Language.

These cultural groups are also found across southern Africa. The BaSotho are the majority ethnic group of Lesotho. The Tswana make up the majority of the population of Botswana. The Swazi are the majority in Swaziland. The Tsonga are also found in Southern Mozambique.

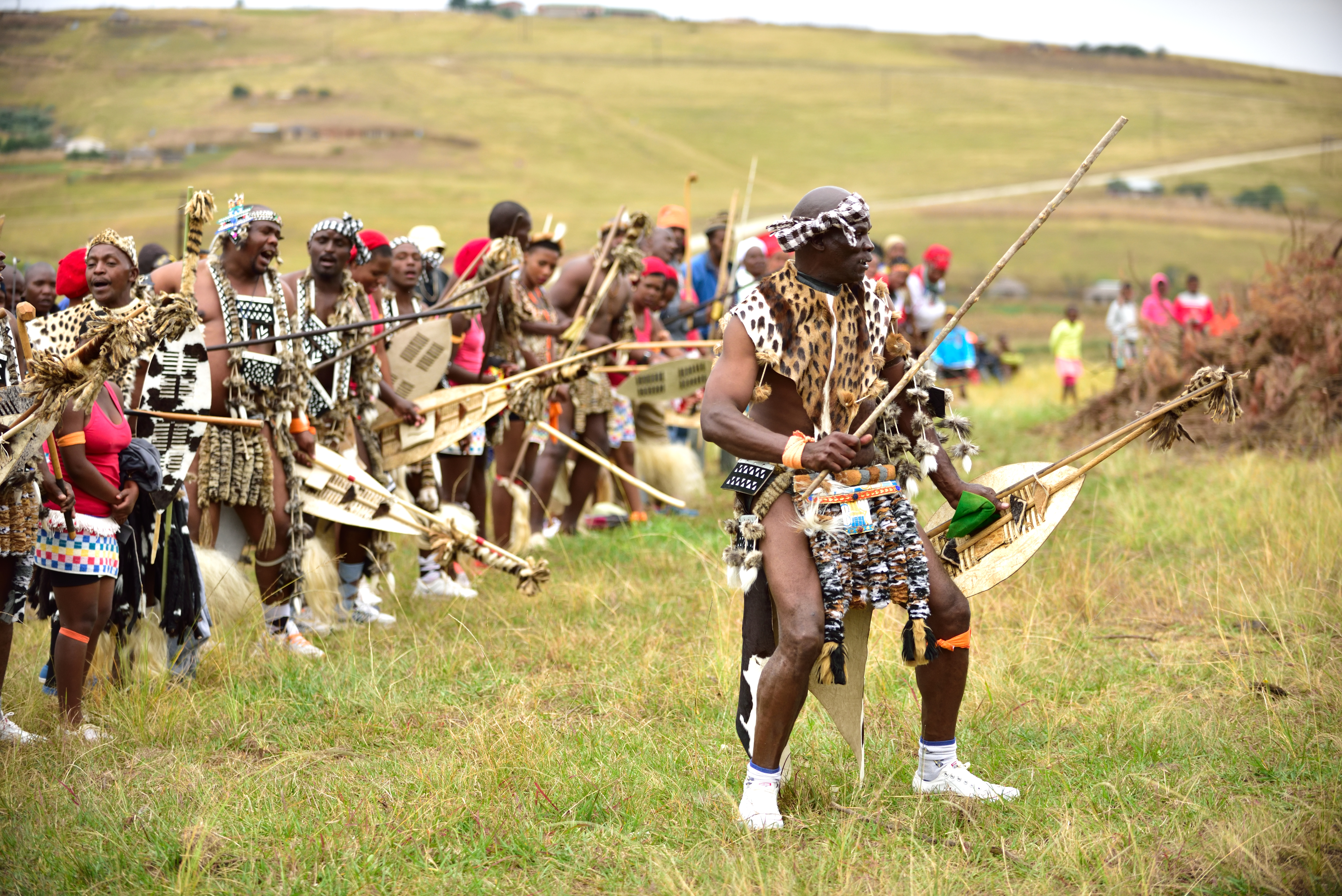
Zulu people in KwaZulu-Natal

The term African in South Africa generally refers to individuals who can trace their ancestral lineage exclusively on the continent, excluding Europe, Oceania, the Americas or Asia

=== Demographics ===
As of the calculations of 2004, there were 34,216,164 people and 8,625,050 households in this category. Their population density is 29/km^{2} and the density of African households is 7/km^{2}. They made up 79% of the total population of South Africa in 2011 and 81% in 2016. The percentage of all African households that are made up of individuals is 19.9%. A little over a quarter (26.5% of households had just one member. More than three-quarters (87%) of homes had four to five members or fewer. Only 13% of households contained six members or more.

This population is dispersed across South Africa with 34 under the age of 15, 21.6% from 15 to 24, 28.3% from 25 to 44, 11.8% from 45 to 64 and 4.3% who are 65 years of age or older. The median age of an African South African is 21 years. For every 100 females there are 91.1 males. For every 100 females age 18 and over, there are 86.2 males.

With regard to education, 22.3% of African people aged 20 and over have received no schooling, 18.5% have had some primary, 6.9% have completed only primary school, 30.4% have had some high education, 16.8% have finished only high school and 5.2% have an education higher than the high school level. Overall, 22% of African people have completed high school and 59% aged 25 to 64, have an upper secondary education as their highest level of education. This places South Africa above the G20 average of 32% and the OECD average of 38%.

The percentage of housing units having a telephone and/or mobile phone in the dwelling is 31.1%. The percentage having access to a nearby phone is 57.2%, and 11.7% do not have nearby access or any access. The percentage of households that have a flush or chemical toilet is 41.9%. Refuse is removed from 41.3% of 'African households by the municipality at least once a week and 11% have no rubbish disposal. Some 17.9% have running water inside their dwelling, 51.7% have running water on their property and 80.2% have access to running water. The percentage of African households using electricity for cooking is 39.3%, for heating, 37.2% and for lighting, 62%. Radios are owned by 68.7% of African households while 44.2% have a television, 1.8% own a computer, 40% have a refrigerator and 24.6% have a mobile phone.

'The unemployment rate of the African population aged 15–65 is 28.1%. The median annual income of African working adults aged 15–65 is ZAR 12,073. Males have a median annual income of ZAR 14,162 versus ZAR 8,903 for females.

== Coloured South Africans ==
The 'Coloured' population include people of mixed heritage who are concentrated in the Cape region, who can have as many as 140 or more ethnicities identified in their DNA.

Not all people of multiracial heritage in South Africa identify as 'Coloured'. Some individuals of mixed heritage prefer to identify as 'Black, 'White', Indian or indigenous South Africans for example, as they are now free to choose. However, during the apartheid era this categorisation was enforced by law for anyone who was determined to be of multiracial descent by the government. This cultural group doesn't have a particular language or traditions because their identity stems from their shared history and sense of community. Although they are an extremely diverse group, many speak Afrikaans as a first language.

The Cape 'Coloureds' originally descended sexual unions of European colonists with indigenous, African and Asian (ie: Javanese, Malay, Indian, Malagasy) slaves or indentured labourers. The Cape Malay identity, which was considered a subgroup of 'Coloured' under the apartheid regime, was generally held to encompass people of multiracial heritage from the Cape who practised Islam.

There is also a significant group of Chinese South Africans (approximately 300,000 or more). They were also classified as a subgroup of 'Coloured' under apartheid. In 2008, the Pretoria High Court ruled that the descendants of mainland Chinese who arrived before 1994, and had been classified as a subgroup of 'Coloured' by the apartheid government, were eligible for redress. As a result of this ruling, about 12,000–15,000 ethnically Chinese citizens who arrived before 1994, numbering 3%–5% of the total Chinese population in the country are now included in the HDI group and benefit from government BEE policies.

However, other Asian cultural groups such as Hong Kongers, Taiwanese and Japanese South Africans were categorised as honorary whites during apartheid.

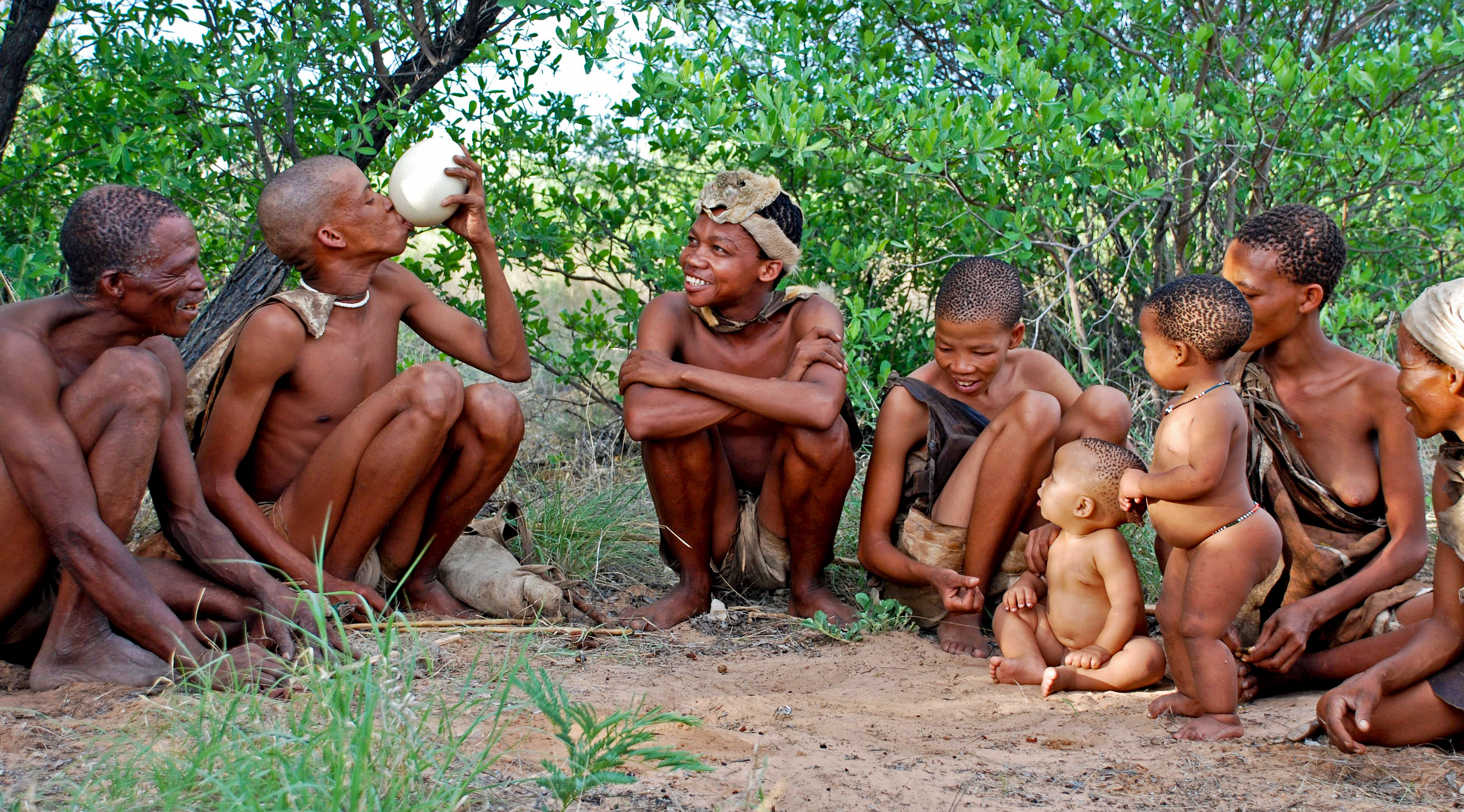
San family in South Africa

Within the Coloured community, more recent immigrants will also be found i.e. Coloureds from the former Rhodesia (now Zimbabwe); Namibia and immigrants of mixed descent from India (such as Anglo-Indians) who were welcomed to the Cape when India and Burma received their Independence.

== White South Africans ==
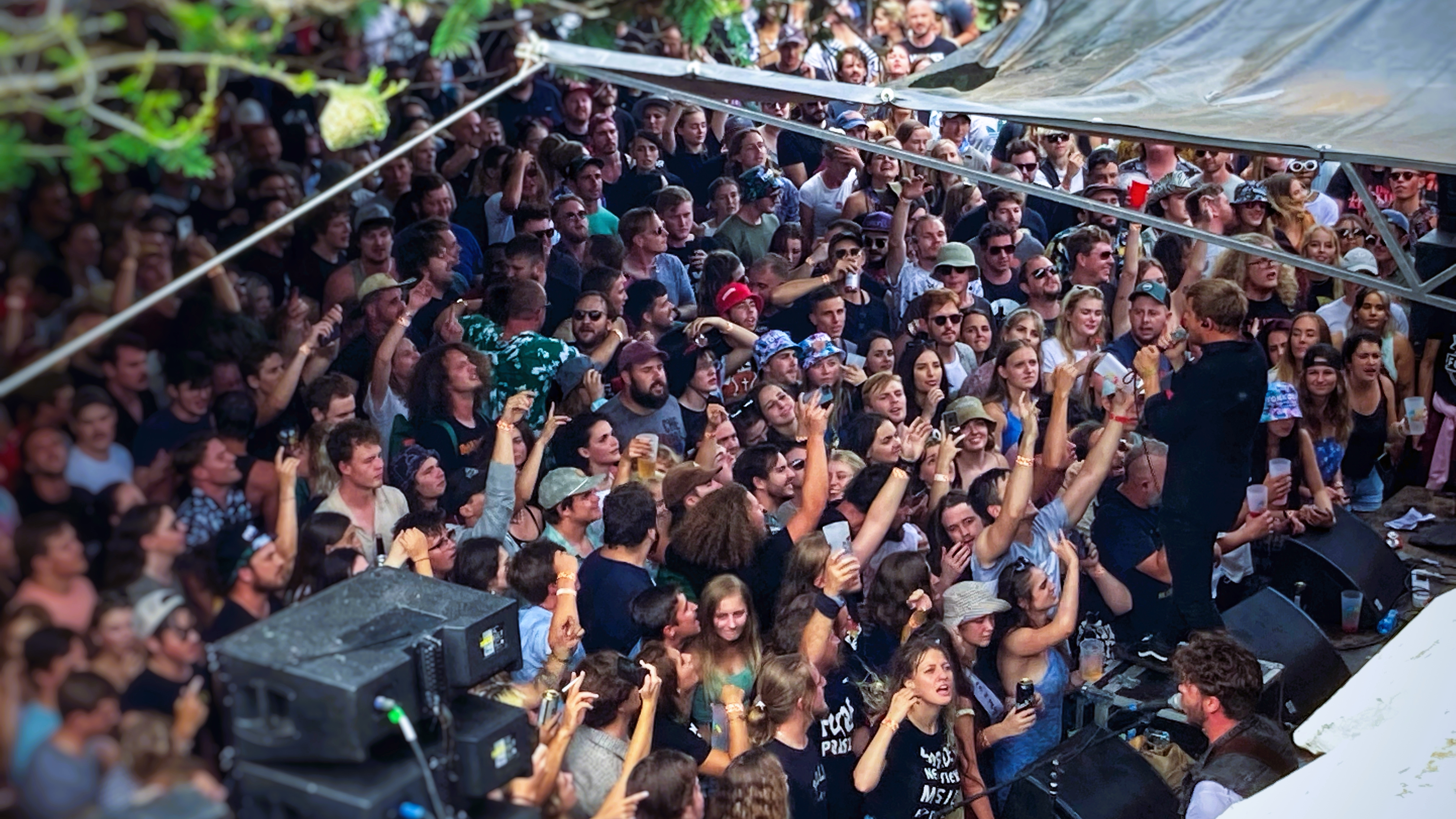
Afrikaners in Pretoria

This group consists predominantly of Dutch, German, French Huguenot, British, Portuguese and other European descendants. Culturally and linguistically, they are divided into Afrikaans-speaking and English-speaking groups. According to the 2022 census, one of the top three most spoken languages in South Africa is Afrikaans (10.6%).

The first census in South Africa in 1911 showed that Whites made up 22% of the population; which declined to 7% in 2022. The white population decreased significantly in the 1990s and 2000s due to a low birth rate and emigration. As a factor in their decision to emigrate, many cite the high crime rate, affirmative action policies and racial discrimination.

In the 1970s, many European descendants living in Portuguese colonies such as Angola and Mozambique moved to South Africa after the independence of those nations.. Forty thousand white Rhodesians also immigrated to South Africa after independence in 1980.

In the 1980s and early 1990s the apartheid government encouraged immigration particularly from Poland, Hungary, Turkey, Azerbaijan, and Armenia. By 2005, an estimated 212,000 British citizens had sought out new lives in South Africa, growing up to 500,000 by 2011.

Between 2000 and 2010 South Africans of European descent returned in large numbers. By May 2014, it was estimated that around 340,000 former South Africans had returned home after immigrating elsewhere in the preceding decade. However, between 1990 and 2026 South Africa lost approximately 1,000,000 White people in total.

July 2026, almost 8,000 Afrikaners have taken up US president Donald Trump's refugee offer and relocated to the USA, with a possible 70,000 who are considering to apply.

=== Demographics ===
As of the census of 2001, there are 4,293,638 Whites and 1,409,690 households in South Africa. Their population density is 4/km^{2} and the density of their households is 1.16/km^{2}. They made up 9.6% of the total population.

The percentage of all White households that are made up of individuals is 19.1%. The average household size is 3.05 members. In South Africa, this population is spread out, with 19% under the age of 15, 15.1% from 15 to 24, 31.0% from 25 to 44, 23.8% from 45 to 64, and 11.1% who are 65 years of age or older. The median age of a White person is 35 years. For every 100 females there are 94 males. For every 100 females age 18 and over, there are 91.1 males.

With regards to education, 1.4% of Whites aged 20 and over have received no schooling, 1,2% have had no more than some primary school education, 0,8% have only completed primary school, 25.9% have had no more than some high school education, 41.3% have finished only high school, and 29.8% have an education higher than the high-school level. Overall, 70.7% of Whites have completed high school.

The percentage of housing units having a telephone and/or mobile phone in the dwelling is 95.4%. The percentage having access to a nearby phone is 4,4%, and 0,2% do not have nearby access or any access. The percentage of White households that have a flush or chemical toilet is 98.7%. Waste is removed from 90,8% of White households by the municipality at least once a week, and 0.5% have no rubbish disposal. Some 87.2% of White have running water inside their dwelling, 95.6% have running water on their property, and 99.4% have access to running water. The percentage of households using electricity for cooking is 96.6%, for heating, 93.2%, and for lighting, 99.2%. Radios are owned by 94.7% of households while 92.6% have a television, 46% own a computer, 97.6% have a refrigerator, and 74.6% have a mobile phone.

The unemployment rate of the White population aged 15–65 is 4.1%. The median annual income of working adults aged 15–65 is ZAR 650,000. White males have a median annual income of ZAR 810,701 versus ZAR 520,392 for females.

== Indian South Africans ==
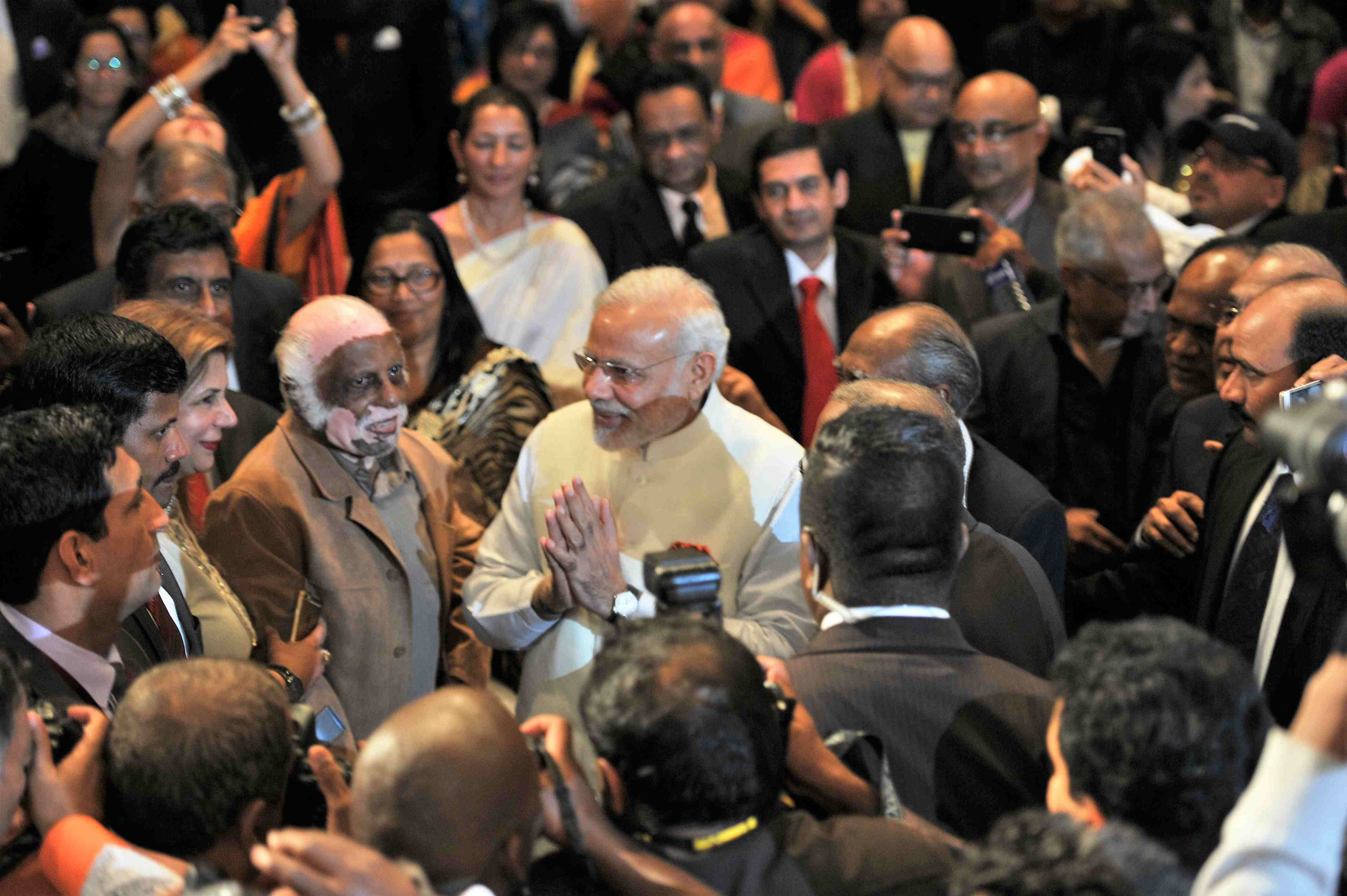
Indian Prime Minister Narendra Modi meets members of Indian community in Durban

Descendants of migrants from British India in the late 19th and early 20th century have an estimated population of 1.2 million or 2.5% of the South African population; many of whom descended from indentured workers brought in the nineteenth century to work on the sugar plantations of the eastern coastal area of Natal and adhered to different religions and spoke different languages. A smaller group, referred to as Passenger Indians came independently for work purposes and business interests at around the same time.

== Other cultural groups ==
The Khoikhoi and San people of South Africa are a minority indigenous population. The Khoikhoi were pastoralists and extensively integrated into the colonial economy, many converting early to Christianity. The San people were hunter-gatherers. These groups were not identified as Black South African, Native South African, or Black African by the colonists, despite being the first inhabitants of South Africa. In the 2011 census for example, the overwhelming majority of the San community in Platfontein originating from the northern parts of Namibia and southern Angola opted to be classified as 'Other' whereas descendants of Namaqualand Khoikhoi classify themselves as Coloured.

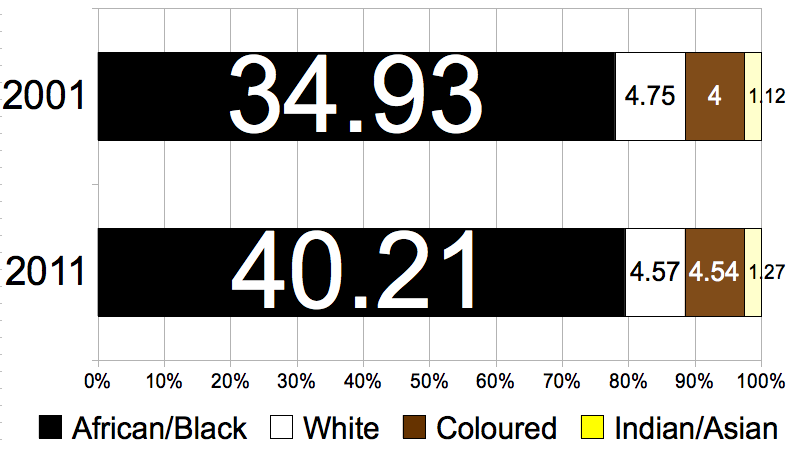
Ethnic groups, 2001–2011 (Numbers are millions of people; horizontal scale is percentage of total population).

=== Lemba ===
There is a small but notable population of Lemba people who live primarily in the north eastern regions of South Africa who have Bantu and Semitic origins.

=== Romani ===
A small population of Kalderash Roma people have also made South Africa their home.

=== Recent immigrants ===
Zimbabweans, Somalis, Ethiopians, Bangladeshis, Pakistanis and Nigerians constitute the largest migrant communities in the last two decades. There are also Vietnamese, Koreans and Filipinos in South Africa.

== Population growth ==
Between 2009 and 2016, South Africa's population increased by 11.6% from an estimated 49.9 million to an estimated 55.7 million.

Population change
Year	'Black African'		'Coloured'		'White'		Indian/Asian		Total	
Year	Pop.	±% p.a.	Pop.	±% p.a.	Pop.	±% p.a.	Pop.	±% p.a.	Pop.	±% p.a.
1996	31,127,631	—	3,600,446	—	4,434,697	—	1,045,596	—	40,583,573	—
2001	35,416,166	+2.6%	3,994,505	+2.1%	4,293,640	−0.6%	1,115,467	+1.3%	44,819,778	+2.0%
2011	41,000,938	+1.5%	4,615,401	+1.5%	4,586,838	+0.7%	1,286,930	+1.4%	51,770,560	+1.5%
2014	43,333,700	+1.9%	4,771,500	+1.1%	4,554,800	−0.2%	1,341,900	+1.4%	54,002,000	+1.4%

== See also ==
- South African National Census of 1996
- South African National Census of 2001
- South African National Census of 2011
- South African National Census of 2022
- Demographics of South Africa
