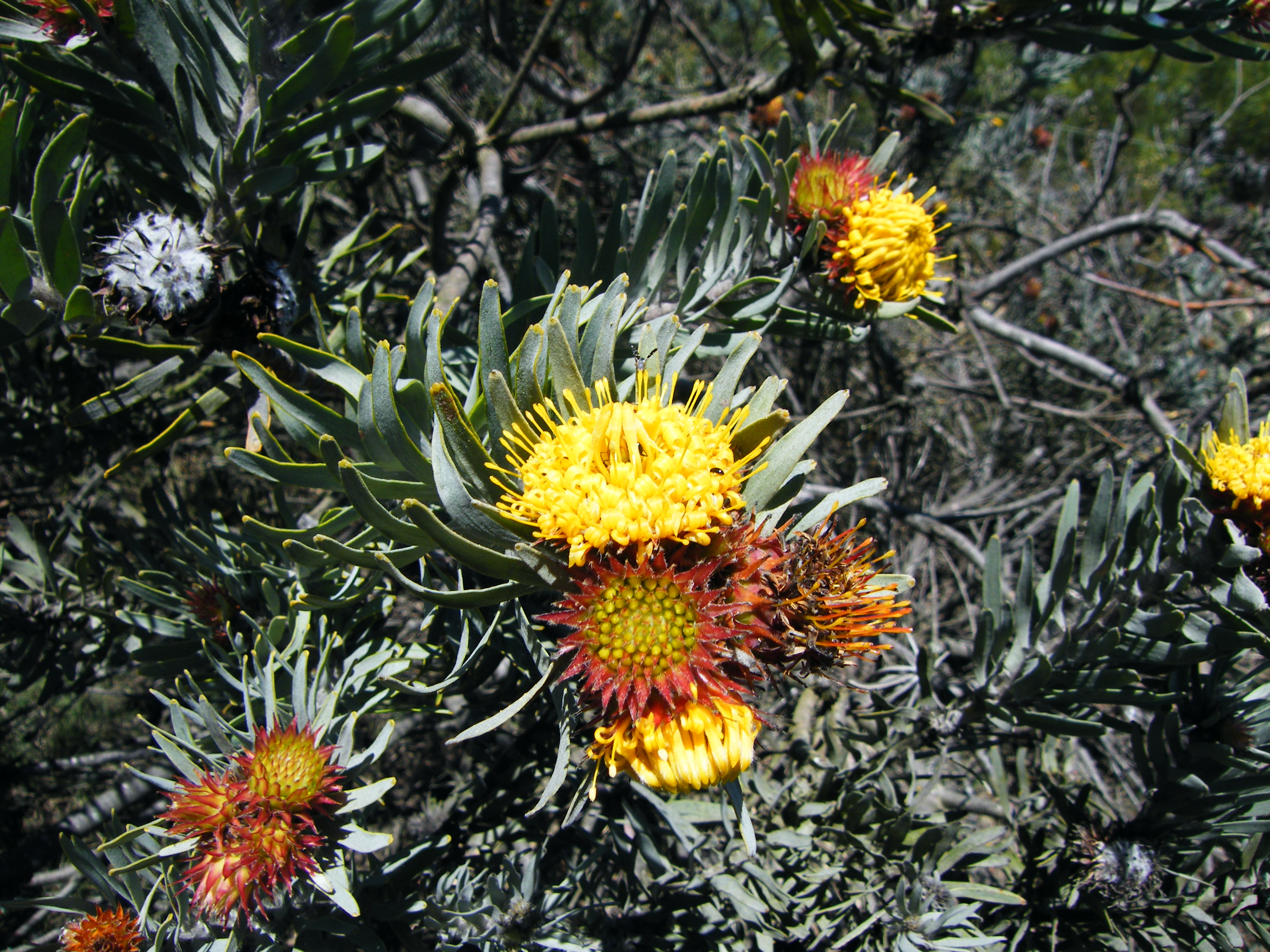

Conservation status
- Vulnerable (IUCN 3.1)

Scientific classification
- Kingdom: Plantae
- Clade: Embryophytes
- Clade: Tracheophytes
- Clade: Angiosperms
- Clade: Eudicots
- Order: Proteales
- Family: Proteaceae
- Genus: Leucospermum
- Species: L. parile

Binomial name
- Leucospermum parile (Thunb.) Rourke

Synonyms
- Leucadendrum parile; Leucospermum dregei

= Leucospermum parile =

Species of plant native to South Africa

Leucospermum parile is a rounded shrub, of up to 1 1/2 m (4.9 ft) high that is assigned to the family Proteaceae. It has narrow, grey felty leaves of about 2 cm (0.79 in) long and 7 mm (0.28 in) wide, with rich yellow, globular, well-scented flower heads of about 3 cm (1.2 in) across. It grows in pure white sand in the sandveld of a very small area in the Western Cape province of South Africa. It is called Malmesbury pincushion in English and Malmesburyluisie in Afrikaans. It flowers from July till November.

== Description ==
The Malmesbury pincushion is a more or less upright, rounded shrub, of up to 1 1/2 m (4.9 ft) high, that develops from a single and stout stem. Many of the lowest branches spread along the ground, while the flowering branches are upright, round in cross-section, and felty hairy. The leaves are slightly pointing upwards and somewhat overlapping, line-shaped or broadly line-shaped, 4–6 cm (1.6–2.4 in) long and 6–8 mm (0.24–0.31 in) wide and are covered in a dense grey layer of short cringy hairs. The tip may be entire or carry up to 3 teeth.

The flower heads, that occur between July and November, are strongly scented, globular or slightly flattened on top, 3–3 1/2 cm (1.2–1.4 in) in diameter, without a stalk or nearly so, and occur in clusters of one to six together near the tip of the flowering branches. The common base of the flowers in the same head is broadly cone-shaped, with a pointy tip, about 14 mm (0.55 in) high and 10 mm (0.39 in) across. The bracts subtending the flower head quickly become hairless, are reddish brown, about 1 cm (0.39 in) long and 1/2 cm (0.20 in) wide, papery in consistency, oval in shape with a pointy tip, which may be upright or somewhat recurved and sometimes with a thin tuft of stiff hairs, and sometimes with a regular row of hairs along the rim. The bracts subtending the individual flower is lance-shaped with a pointy tip, 10 mm long and 3 mm wide, the outside woolly near the base and hairless higher up except for a tuft of stiff hair at the tip. The rich yellow, 4-merous perianth is straight in the bud and 1 1/2–2 cm (0.59–0.79 in) long. The lower part, where the lobes remain merged when the flower has opened (called tube), is hairless, cylinder-shaped, but slightly compressed sideways and about 4 mm (0.16 in) long. The lobes in the middle part (or claws), where the perianth is split lengthwise, are 9–12 mm (0.35–0.47 in) long, the claw facing the rim of the flower head hairless, the other three softly hairy. The upper part, which enclosed the pollen presenter in the bud consists of four narrowly lance-shaped limbs are about 4 mm (0.16 in) long, the one facing the rim of the head hairless and the three with few glandular hairs. From the perianth emerges a straight style of 1 1/2–2 cm (0.6–0.8 in) long. The ovary is subtended by four opaque awl-shaped scales of about 1 1/2 mm (0.06 in) long. The flowers of Leucospermum parile are sweetly scented.

== Taxonomy ==
The Malmesbury pincushion was probably collected for science for the first time by Francis Masson and herbarium specimens and seeds presumably arrived in England in 1789. It was first described in a book in 1809 titled On the cultivation of the plants belonging to the natural order of Proteeae, that was written by Joseph Knight, as part of an extensive revision of the Proteaceae that is attributed to the famous botanist Richard Anthony Salisbury. Salisbury assigned twenty four species to his new genus Leucadendrum, including the newly named Leucadendrum parile. In 1818, Robert Sweet assigned the species to Robert Brown's genus Leucospermum, conforming to the general rejection of Salisbury's names of Proteaceae in favour of those suggested by Brown, on the basis of the assumed plagiarism. So Sweet created the new combination Leucospermum parile. In 1910, Edwin Percy Phillips also assigned Salisbury's species to Leucospermum, but named it in honor of Johann Franz Drège, creating the superfluous name Leucospermum dregei.

The Malmesbury pincushion is assigned to the section Leucospermum.

The species name parile is a Latin word meaning "equal".

== Distribution habitat and ecology ==
Leucospermum parile only occurs over a small area between the Mamre Moravian Road station and Abbotsdale in the north, Dassenberg in the west and Kalbaskraal in the south, all within the Malmesbury District.

It grows on flats in the strandveld consisting of fairly fine, white sands effectively devoid of organic matter, of Tertiary origin. It can be found at 30–150 m (98–492 ft) elevation. Within its distribution, the annual precipitation is 375–500 mm (14.8–19.7 in), mainly falling during the winter half year. The vegetation further consisting of several Erica species, Cryptadenia, Serruria, Passerina, and low, tufted Restionaceae.

Most plants start flowering about three years after germination. The species is pollinated by insects, particularly butterflies, bees and beetles, and the fruits that fall to the ground about two months after flowering are collected by ants, who carry them to their underground nests. Here they eat a pale outer part that is attractive to ants. The remaining seeds are left in the nests and are both protected against consumption by rodents and birds, and against fire. Adult plants do not survive fire.

The phosphorus content of Leucospermum parile has been studied over its biological life cycle. It was found that the seeds contained much phosphorus compounds. During the first two years after germination, phosphorus compounds concentrated in the leaves. In senescent plants, the phosphorus content of the leaves was lower, and phosphorus had moved to the seeds. Such a change over the life cycle is probably representative for many other species in the fynbos and other nutient-poor soils.

== Conservation ==
Some dense and extensive stands occur, but agricultural development has decimated the populations of L. parile. Where it still survives, is may be transplanted by invasive alien Acacia species. Plants can now mainly be found in uncultivated road sides. It is considered an endangered species.
