= Oukloof =

- Location within Western Cape Location within South Africa
- Coordinates: 33.387252°S 18.900792°E
- Country: South Africa
- Province: Western Cape
- Municipality: Swartland
- Time zone: UTC+2 (SAST)
- Postal code (street): 7307
- Area code: 022
- Website: https://oukloof.riebeeklegacy.org

Oukloof was a small rural community in the Western Cape of South Africa that was forcibly removed from their homes in 1965, and relocated in a nearby location now known as Esterhof.

== Location ==
The community was located at the southeast edge of Riebeek-Kasteel.

== History and context ==
One of the earliest available references to the community is from a Dominee (Ds Johannes Stephanus Hauman, a strong supporter of missionary work), who recorded the membership of congregations in Riebeek Kasteel between 1881 and 1907, identifying a Mission Church in Riebeek Kasteel having about 30 'coloured' members. They continued to live and work in the area near the mission church for the next 60 years.

On 23 December 1961, Riebeek Kasteel is declared a white-only group area (Procl. 152 of 1961) that was outlined in the local Swartland newspaper.

The whole area west of the railway track will be white, the Southeast will be coloured. It is the responsibility of the Village Management to plan the new area and to supply services. The Village Management must also supply houses to those who cannot afford it. Individuals can apply for a loan if they want to buy their own houses. Three months' notice should be given prior to the move.

On 6 January 1965, the Provincial Administration approved the establishment of a new coloured township on the other side of the railway tracks, that was later named Esterhof. On 1 August 1968, the original land known as Oukloof was transferred from the Village Management Board to the Dutch Reformed Church, for R250. It is now largely set out as a commercial vineyard.

== See also ==
Forced displacement
