= 1996 census =

1996 census may refer to:

- Canada 1996 Census
- South African National Census of 1996
