= Esterhof =

Settlement in Western Cape, South Africa

- Location within Western Cape Location within South Africa
- Coordinates: 33°23′08″S 18°55′19″E
- Country: South Africa
- Province: Western Cape
- District: West Coast
- Municipality: Swartland

Area
  - Total: 0.51 km^{2} (0.20 sq mi)

Population (2011)
  - Total: 3,617
  - Density: 7,100/km^{2} (18,000/sq mi)

Racial makeup (2011)
  - Coloured: 83.7%
  - Black African: 14.2%
  - Indian/Asian: 1.0%
  - White: 0.6%
  - Other: 0.5%

First languages (2011)
  - Afrikaans: 85.1%
  - Xhosa: 8.9%
  - English: 2.8%
  - Other: 3.2%
- Time zone: UTC+2 (SAST)

Esterhof is a settlement and housing development in West Coast District Municipality in the Western Cape province of South Africa. Esterhof is located roughly two kilometers to the east of Riebeek-Kasteel, separated by a railway and industrial buildings, and was originally created as part of apartheid initiatives that forcibly displaced Coloured people out of Oukloof in the 1960s.

== Geography ==
Esterhof is two kilometers east of Riebeek-Kasteel's center, and is part of the broader agrarian Swartland region. The settlement is also approximately 6 kilometres (3.7 mi) west of the Berg River. Esterhof is in the hot-summer Mediterranean climate (Csa) zone of the Köppen climate classification system.

== History ==
Esterhof was founded by the local white-run Village Management Board in the mid-1960s to house the Coloured community that the Board was forcibly displacing from Oukloof, near Riebeek-Kasteel. A local Swartland newspaper announced in December 1961 that Riebeek-Kasteel had been declared a whites-only area, stating:

The whole area west of the railway track will be white, the Southeast will be coloured. It is the responsibility of the Village Management to plan the new area and to supply services. The Village Management must also supply houses to those who cannot afford it. Individuals can apply for a loan if they want to buy their own houses. Three months notice should be given prior to the move.

— Swartland newspaper, 23 December 1961 (Cape Town Archive Repository: 1961 Group Act Press release CDC 597 G7/493/1)

The Department of Coloured Affairs disputed the chosen location of the new community, noting that the land wasn't suitable for new housing, resembled a swamp, was too far from the town, and was too close to wine cellars and a wine waste sediment dam. The local Village Management Board went ahead regardless, naming the new settlement Esterhof after its chair, Johannes Esterhuysen. Forced displacement out of Oukloof began in September 1965, and ultimately 62 families were moved to Esterhof. New residents were promised titled deeds after they had lived in Esterhof for 10 years, but this never happened.

In 1997, following apartheid's end, 56 former Oukloof residents lodged a land claim with the Commission on Restitution of Land Rights, providing documentation of having previously lived in Riebeek-Kasteel and asking for both monetary compensation and title deeds to their Esterhof homes. The Commission decided that financial compensation could be used by individuals to settle their debts to the municipality, which would then allow them to acquire full land tenure. In 2000, R17,500 (2000) (equivalent to R55,855.46 or US$4,220.63 in 2018) was paid to each of the 56 claimants. One claimant noted that many former Oukloof residents thought the amount was too small, but by then "it was December and everybody became desperate to have something rather than nothing." Residents used the restitution money on basic needs, renovations, furniture, and purchases associated with memories of their former lives in Oukloof. For others, it enabled geographic and social mobility, allowing them to leave Riebeek-Kasteel and the Riebeek Valley, which many viewed as a site of entrenched oppression.

As of 2004, Esterhof is a low-income majority-Coloured community with high rates of unemployment and overcrowding. Most of its population are seasonally employed on farms, in factories, or as domestic workers. Esterhof's population has grown from around 2,000 in 2004 to over 3,600 in 2011.
