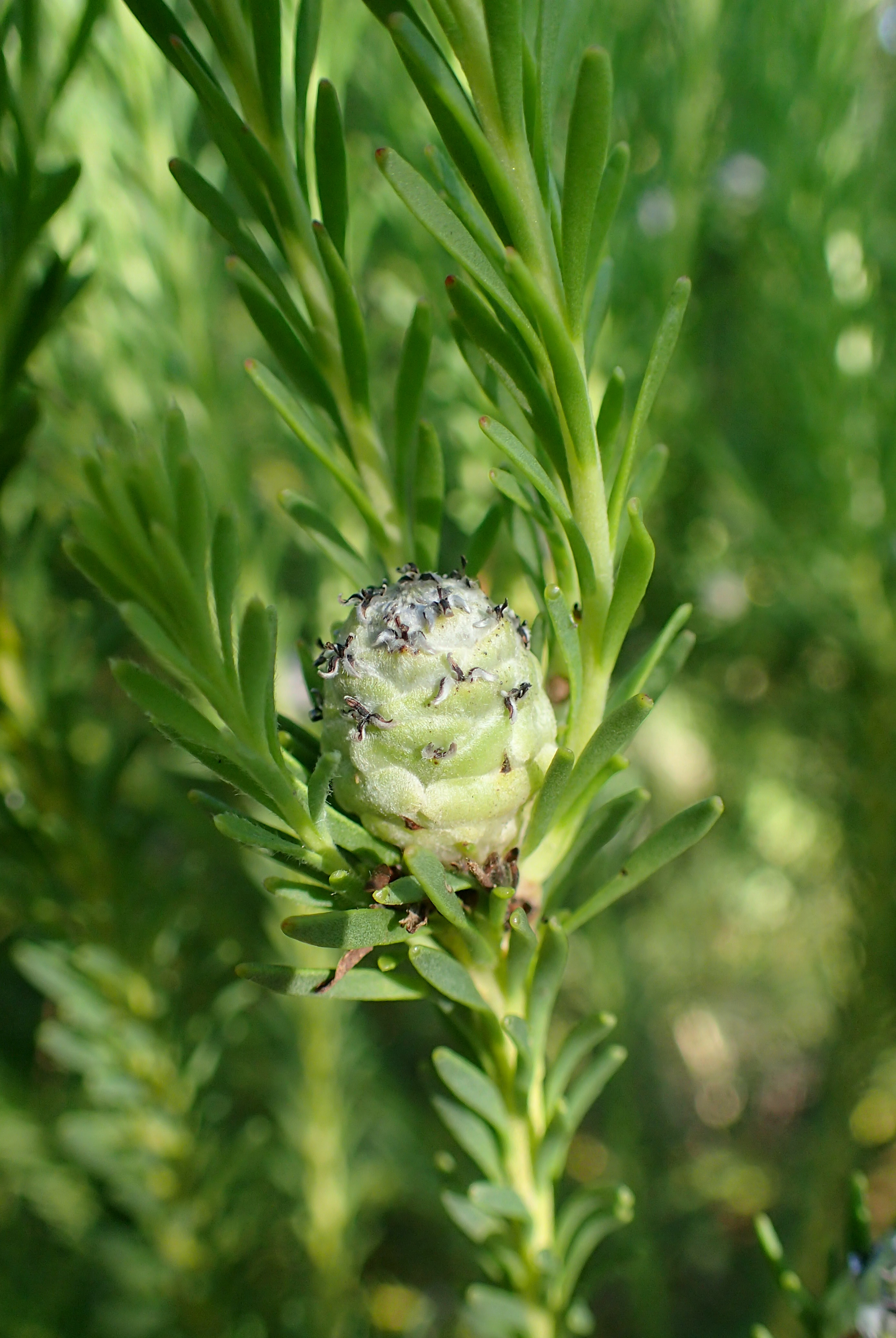

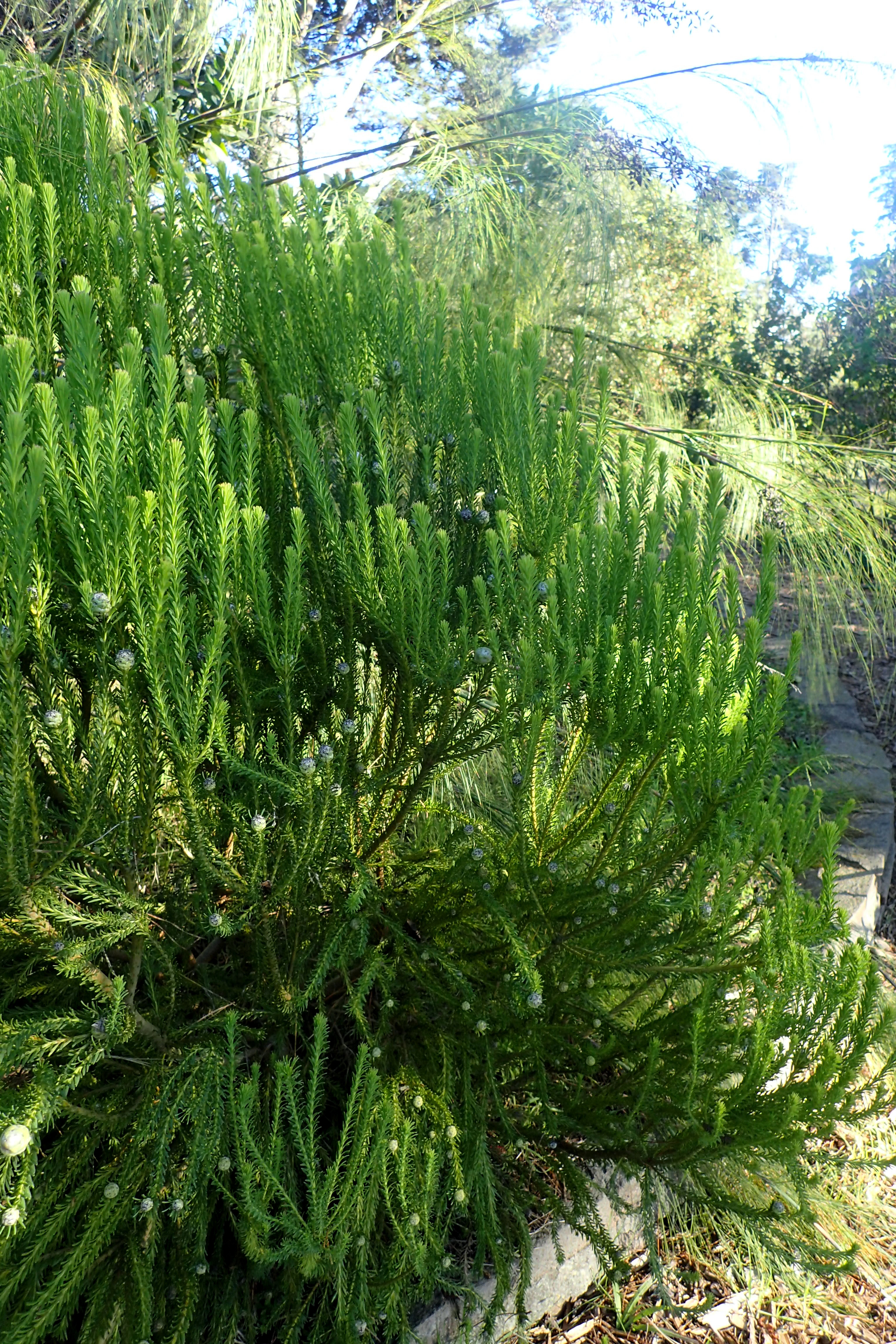

Conservation status
- Near Threatened (IUCN 3.1)

Scientific classification
- Kingdom: Plantae
- Clade: Tracheophytes
- Clade: Angiosperms
- Clade: Eudicots
- Order: Proteales
- Family: Proteaceae
- Genus: Leucadendron
- Species: L. linifolium

Binomial name
- Leucadendron linifolium (Jacq.) R.Br.

= Leucadendron linifolium =

Species of plant

Leucadendron linifolium, the line-leaf conebush, is a flower-bearing shrub that belongs to the genus Leucadendron and forms part of the fynbos. The plant is native to the Western Cape, South Africa.

== Description ==
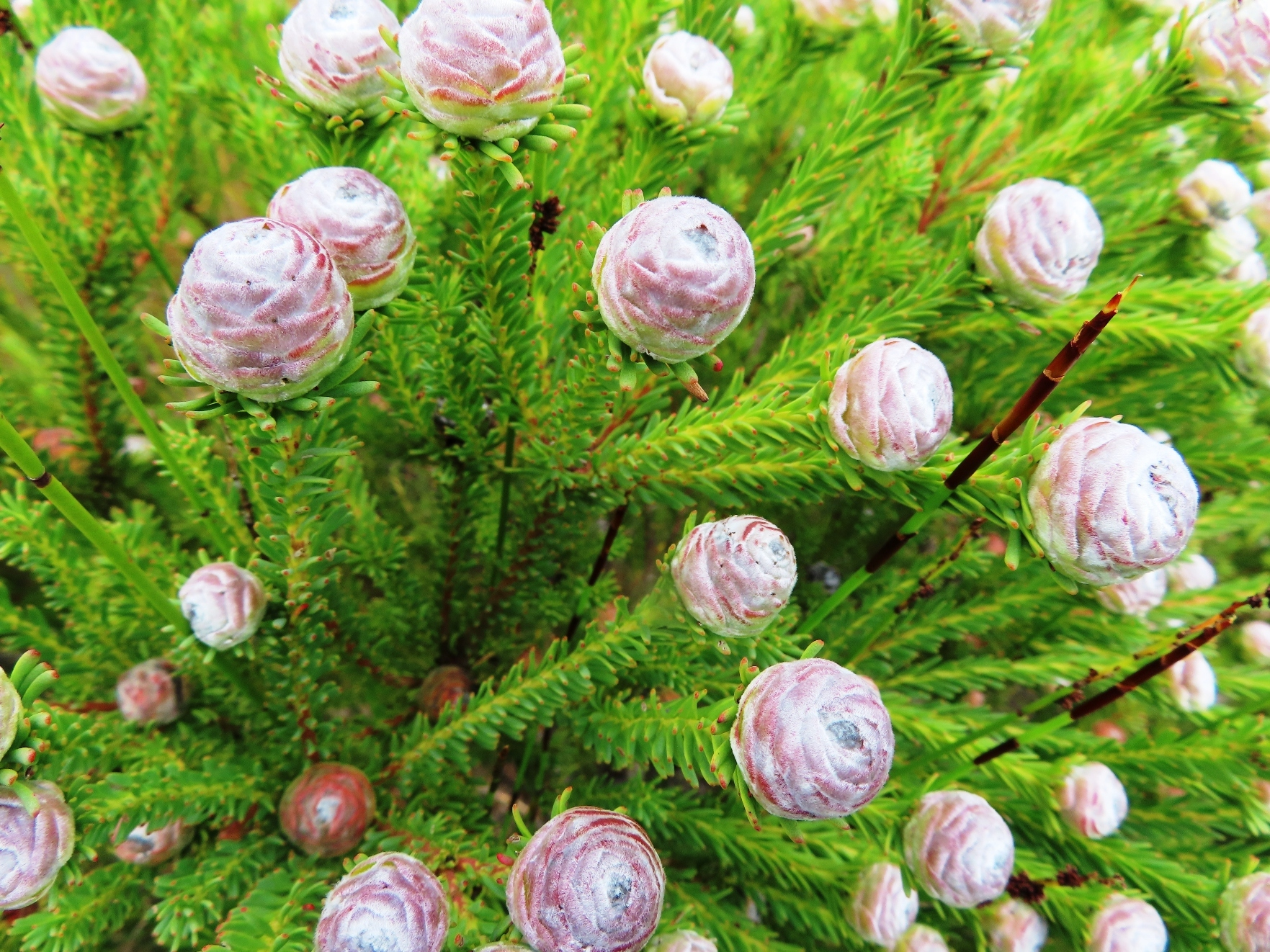

The shrub grows 2 m (6.6 ft) tall and bears flowers in September to October. Fire destroys the plant but the seeds survive. The seeds are stored in a toll on the female plant and are released where they fall to the ground and are possibly spread by the wind. The plant is unisexual and there are male and female plants. Insects do the pollination.

In Afrikaans, it is known as the Duineknoppiesbos.

== Distribution and habitat ==
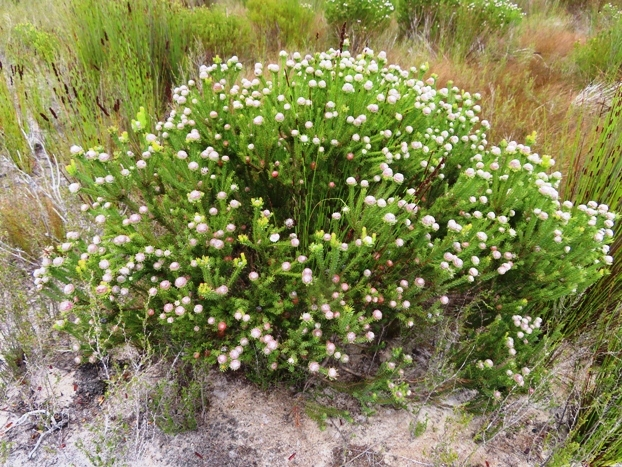

The plant occurs in the Cape Flats from Eerste River to the Strand, Bot River to Elim and Bredasdorp, Potberg, and Jakkalsfontein to Riversdal Plains. It grows mainly in water-permeable, sandy soil at altitudes of 5–120 m (16–394 ft).

== Bibliography ==
- https://redlist.sanbi.org/species.php?species=794-76
- https://pza.sanbi.org/leucadendron-linifolium
- https://biodiversityexplorer.info/plants/proteaceae/leucadendron_linifolium.htm
- https://www.proteaatlas.org.za/conebu9.htm
