= Nigerians in South Africa =

Ethnic group in South Africa

- (Nigeria) (South Africa)
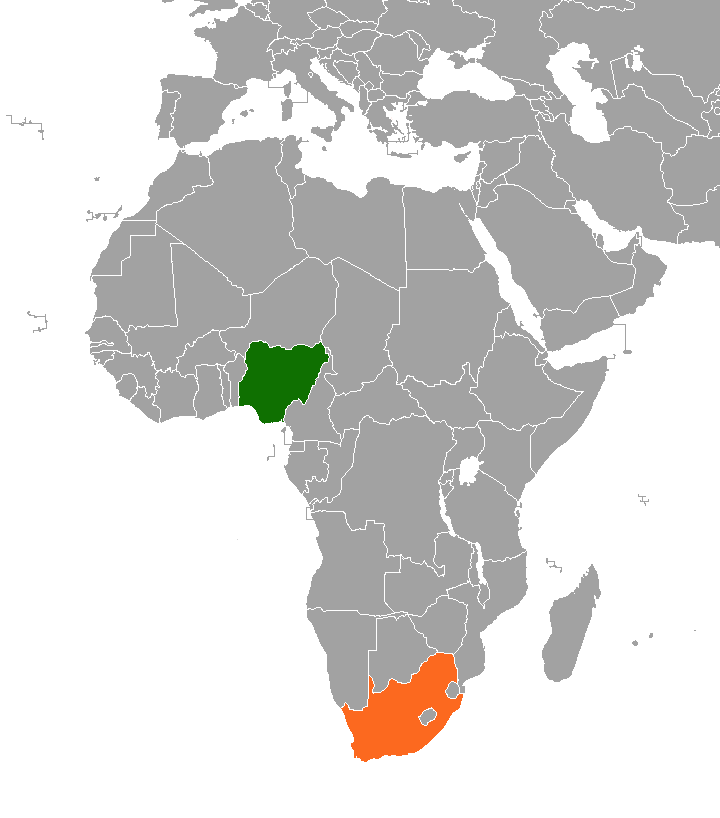

Total population
- 500 000 - 800 000

Regions with significant populations
- Throughout the country, but mostly urban areas: Cape Town, Johannesburg, Pretoria, Durban, Pietermaritzburg, Polokwane, Nelspruit.

Languages
- Hausa, Igbo, Yoruba, South African English, Afrikaans, Nigerian Pidgin and other Languages of South Africa

Religion
- Christianity, Islam

Related ethnic groups
- Nigerian diaspora

Nigerians in South Africa are people currently residing in South Africa, who were either born, raised in or have ancestry from Nigeria. The number of documented Nigerians in South Africa was estimated to be 24,000 in 2011, and 30,314 according to the 2016 Community Survey. In 2023, it was found that over 500,000 Nigerians were living in South Africa as Illegal immigrants.

The end of Apartheid in 1994 saw a large migration of Nigerians to South Africa, due to lax immigration laws as the country opened up after years of international sanctions. The arrival of Nigerians to South Africa began to increase drastically in 2004 when monthly entries became 2,000 and then 4,000 in 2010. Ultimately, the entries of Nigerian Nationals from 2004 to 2010 were about 36,000. Among these increased migrants were entrepreneurs, skilled workers, students and their dependents. Nigerians tend to move to Gauteng, KwaZulu-Natal and Western Cape provinces.

== Motivations ==
Nigerians first moved to South Africa after 1994, due to overpopulation and harsh conditions in Nigeria. A considerable number of Nigerian migrants initially travelled on tourist visas, before deciding to overstay their visas and settle in South Africa illegally. Others came in as students while some came seeking asylum due to the activities of terrorists in Nigeria.

About 1,000 to 3,000 Nigerians applied for asylum over the past ten years, with significant annual variation in the number of applications. These numbers represent a minority of total asylum seekers to the country, which include people from Somalia, Ethiopia and the Congo. Among these set of individuals, 99.9% of Nigerian cases are rejected.

== Social networks ==
Nigerian social networks have spread from the urban neighborhoods where immigrant Nigerians landed in South African cities in the mid-1990s. There has been a dispersal of Nigerians from Hillbrow (Johannesburg), Yoeville and Berea, Gauteng to other parts of Joburg. There are at least four Nigerian organizations in Johannesburg alone Which including, the West Rand Nigerian Association, the Diamond Brothers Club (Randburg), the Nigerian Union of South Africa, the Egbe Omo Oodua (Yeoville). However, these organizations are on an ethno-cultural basis of which the first two are particularly Igbo while the last two belong to the Yoruba tribe. These organizations carry out charitable activities towards fellow Nigerians in South Africa.

The Nigerian High Commission in South Africa honors certain South African-based individuals including doctors, engineers, fashion designers and academics during award ceremonies. Recent qualitative research suggests that intermarriages do occur between Nigerian men and South African women.

== Crime ==
The relationship between South Africa and Nigeria slowly became severed as a result of a trend that grew rapidly between 1994 and 1998. Many Nigerian nationals have ventured into organized crimes involving illegal drug trafficking, sex slaves, prostitutions and internet scams. This was portrayed very negatively by the South African media, which portrayed immigrants as criminals and a threat to the South African economic security. However, these widely accepted claims of criminal activities by Nigerians represent a larger amount of the community.

The view of Nigerians as drug dealers, human traffickers and internet scammers, spurred attacks by South Africans on various occasions. The relatively higher qualifications of some Nigerians, gave them an advantage in the job market thereby, making it difficult for the locals to get access to high paying jobs given South Africa's already high youth unemployment rate. Recent attacks took place in 2009, 2015 and 2019, leading to the deaths and injuries of many poor Nigerians. The attacks instigated violent reactions on South African businesses in Nigeria as many condemned the xenophobic violence taking place there.

In response, South African President Cyril Ramaphosa made an apology to Nigeria in 2019 through his envoy Jeff Radebe, saying that he was ashamed of the violence towards Nigerians. He said, "The incident does not represent what we stand for," adding that South African police would "leave no stone unturned" in bringing those involved to justice. Ramaphosa, addressing the BBC, further said "We are very concerned and of course as a nation we [are] ashamed because this goes against the ethos of what South Africa stands for". President Buhari responded to the apologies from the South African president, pledging that the relationship between the two countries will be solidified," a statement from his office said.

== Notable people ==
- Glenn Mena, musician
- Akin Omotoso, Film Maker
- Yewande Omotoso, Author
- Alex Okosi, Media, Entertainment
- Willy Okpara, Sport
- Idah Peterside, Sport
- Chidimma Adetshina, Beauty Pageant Queen

== See also ==
- Nigeria-South Africa relations
