= Risenga Maluleke =

South African politician

The Honourable Risenga Maluleke Statistician-General of South Africa

Mr Maluleke

Statistician-General of South Africa
- Incumbent
- Assumed office 6 March 2017
- President: Cyril Ramaphosa
- Preceded by: Pali Lehohla

Manager for Stats SA in Limpopo
- In office 1 November 1997 – 1 November 2017
- President: Cyril Ramaphosa

Personal details
- Born: Risenga Maluleke; 1 February 1963 (age 63)
- Party: African National Congress
- Occupation: Politician; trade union leader; educator

Risenga Maluleke (born 1 February 1963) is a South African politician and educator who is the current Statistician-General of South Africa since 2017 and head of Statistics South Africa. He previously served as manager for Statistics South Africa in Limpopo Province, head of Department of Economic Development, as well as executive manager in the Office of the Statistician-General.

== Early life and education ==
Maluleke was born on 1 February 1963. He has a bachelor's in mathematical statistics from University of Limpopo. In the early 1990s, he worked with Southern African Development Community and the United Nations Statistics Commission, as well as the Economic Commission for Africa.
