= Trilly =

American record producer (born 1992)

- Born: Darlington Chika Njoku; 16 September 1992 (age 33); California, United States
- Genres: Hip-Hop
- Occupations: Record producer; rapper
- Years active: 2018–present
- Label: Trillion Dollar Records
- Website: tdrecords.com

Darlington Chika Njoku (born 16 September 1992) known professionally as Trilly, is an American record producer, rapper, and ex-basketball player. He is the founder and the CEO of Trillion Dollar Records.

== Early life ==
Trilly was born Darlington Chika Njoku in Los Angeles, California, on 16 September 1992, the son of Marcel Njoku and Mrs Therese Njoku.

== Career ==
In an interview in May 2020, Trilly announced that he has a song with Tory Lanez and Joe Moses but didn't disclose when it will be released; instead he teased a new video for the song "Ay Bishhh", which was released in June.

In August 2020, Trilly announced a collaboration with afrobeat artist Davido. In November of that year, the record titled 1942 was released. In September 2020, he released the "T-shirt" video featuring Sada Baby. Later that month, Guardian Music reported that the record has surpassed over 100,000 streams across DSPs. In November, Trilly released his new single with a video titled "Sheikhs". He was also featured on singer Glenn Mena new record, Standard.
