= Koringberg =

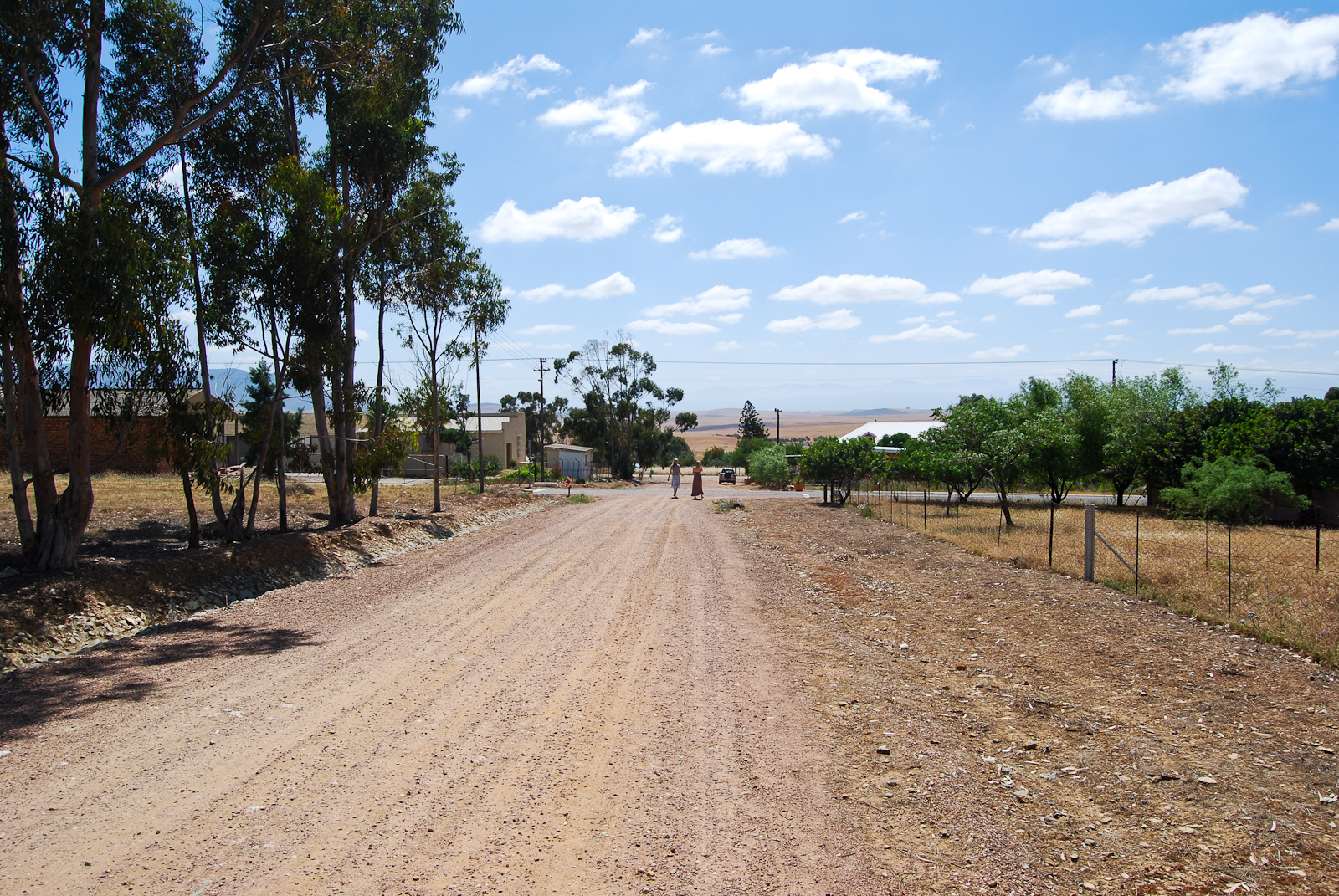
- Koringberg

- Location within Western Cape Location within South Africa
- Coordinates: 33°02′S 18°40′E
- Country: South Africa
- Province: Western Cape
- District: West Coast
- Municipality: Swartland

Area
  - Total: 3.86 km^{2} (1.49 sq mi)

Population (2011)
  - Total: 1,214
  - Density: 315/km^{2} (815/sq mi)

Racial makeup (2011)
  - Black African: 3.2%
  - Coloured: 84.9%
  - Indian/Asian: 0.1%
  - White: 11.3%
  - Other: 0.5%

First languages (2011)
  - Afrikaans: 95.5%
  - English: 3.8%
  - Other: 0.7%
- Time zone: UTC+2 (SAST)
- PO box: 7312

Koringberg is a settlement in West Coast District Municipality in the Western Cape province of South Africa.

Village 118 km north-north-east of Cape Town and 17 km north of Moorreesburg. Founded at Warren's Camp in 1923, it was thus named because it is situated in a wheat growing area. The name is Afrikaans and means ‘wheat mountain’.
