= 2001 South African census =

2001 National Census
- 9 October 2001
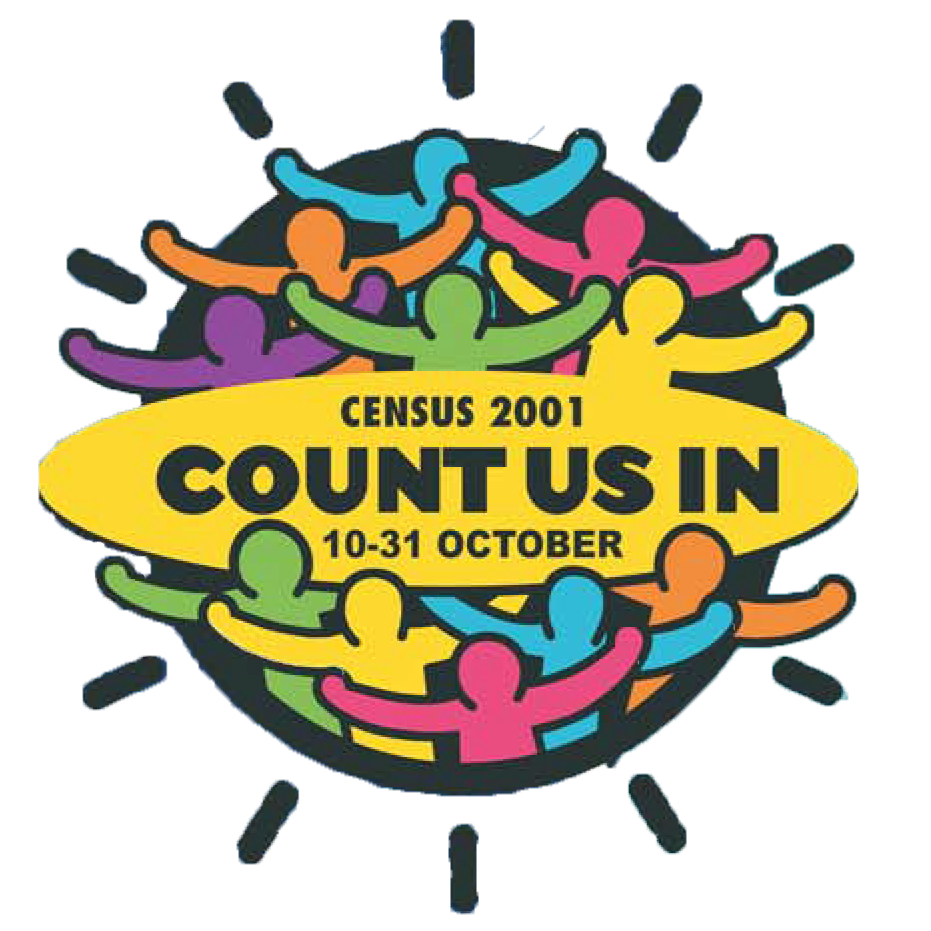

General information
- Country: Republic of South Africa
- Authority: Statistics South Africa

Results
- Total population: 44,819,778 (9.92% ▲)
- Most populous province: KwaZulu-Natal
- Least populous province: Northern Cape

The National Census of 2001 was the 2nd comprehensive national census of the Republic of South Africa, or Post-Apartheid South Africa. It undertook to enumerate every person present in South Africa on the census night between 9–10 October 2001 at a cost of R 987,000,000.

It was organised and planned by Statistics South Africa in terms of the Statistics Act from the beginning of 1999, under the commission of the Statistician-General Pali Lehohla. The enumeration primarily took place from 10 to 31 October 2001 and the results were published in 2003.

== Pre-enumeration ==
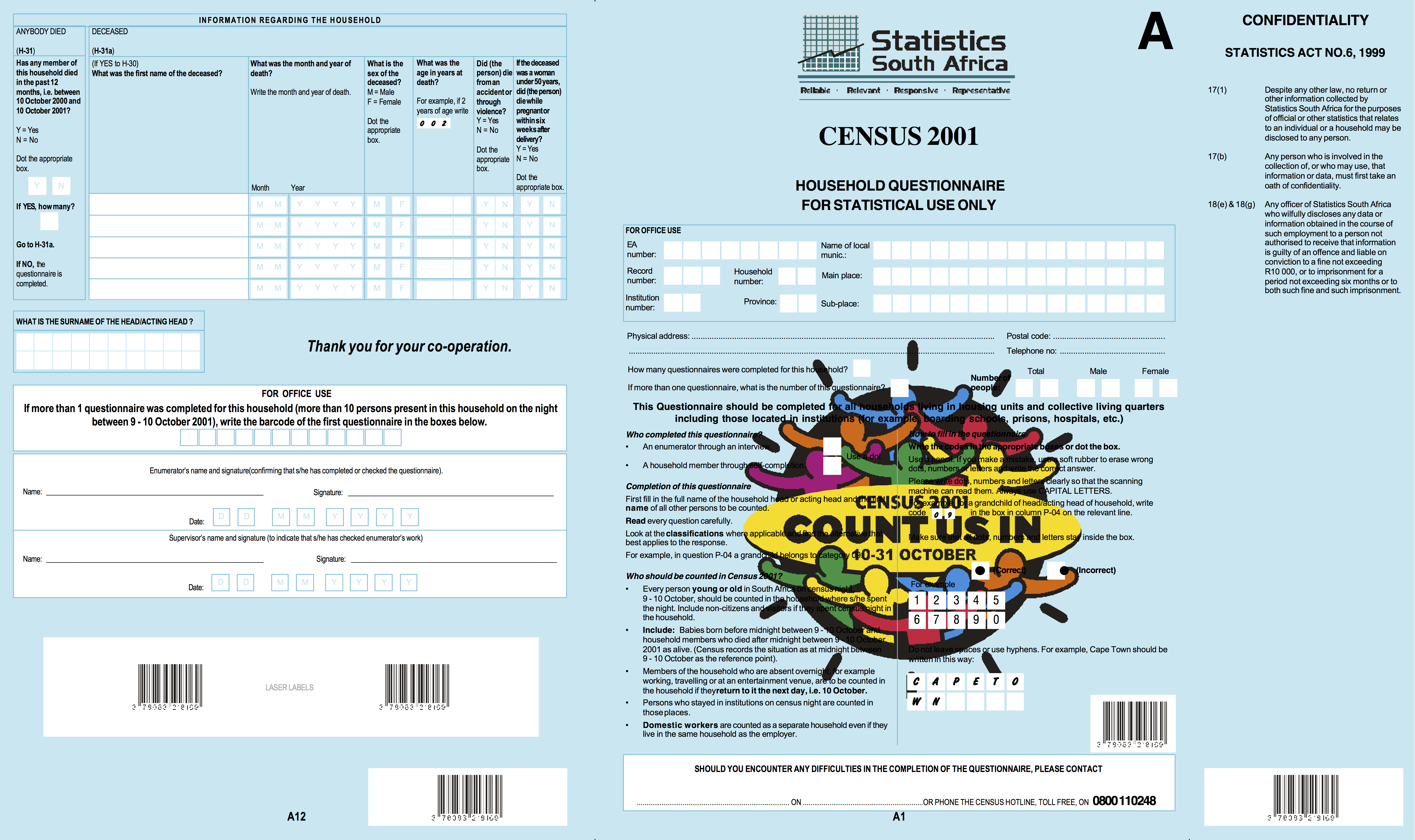
Questionnaire A

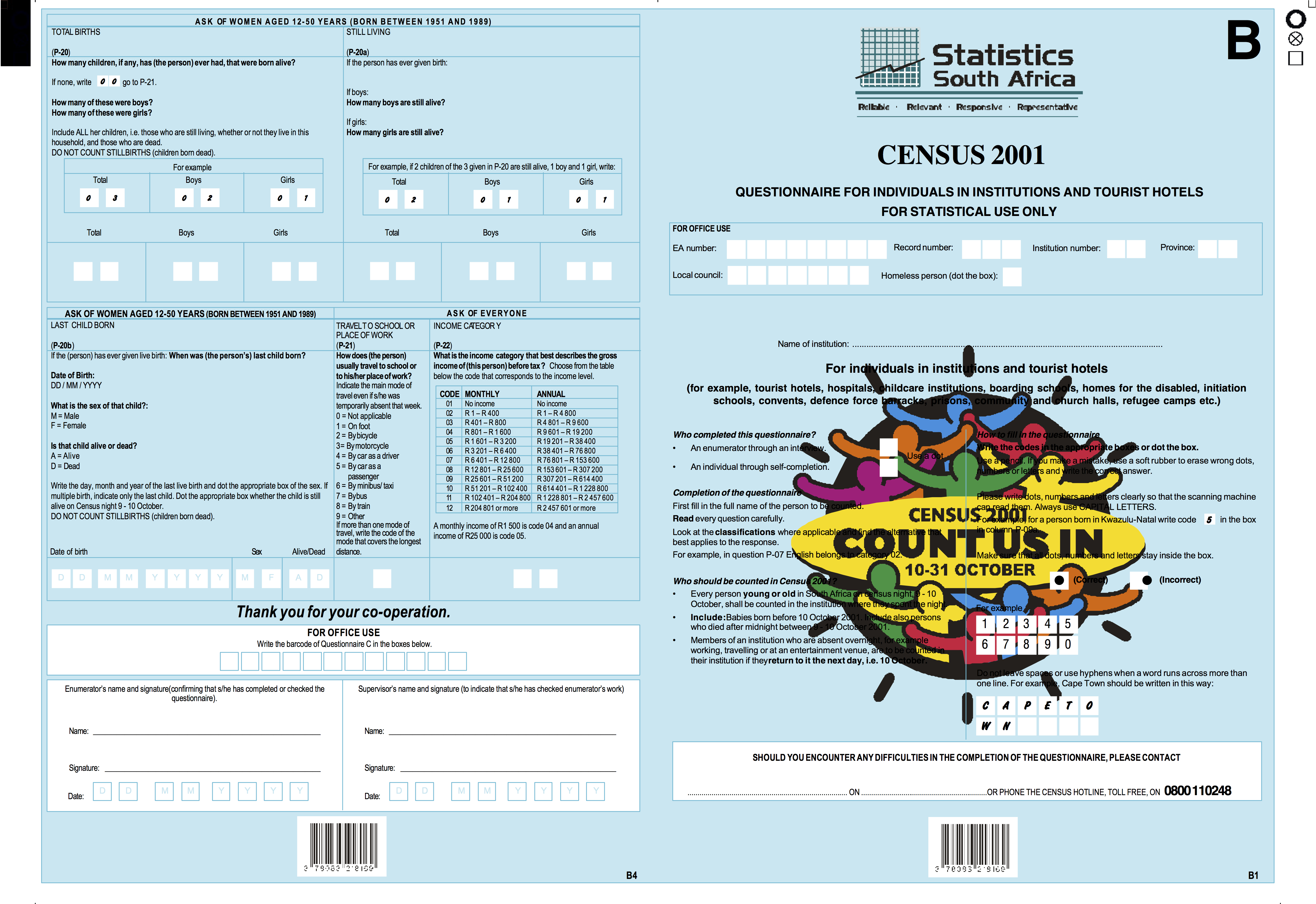
Questionnaire B

This was the first South African census to use a Geographic Information System to determine the Enumeration Areas. Traditionally, the areas were created using analogue and sketch maps. This geographic database was created out of several data sets acquired from government departments and private sector companies. It included topographic maps, cadastral data, administrative boundaries, aerial photography, satellite imagery and videography. Each area was classified according to its location as one of four types:

- Formal urban area
- Informal urban area
- Rural area (commercial farms)
- Tribal (traditional) area

The country was divided into approximately 80,000 manageable "pockets of land" with an average of 150 living spaces in each Enumeration Area. The intention was that each area could be handled by a single enumerator, to allow every household in the country to be visited within the timeframe provided.

The census questionnaire was developed and tested on a computer-based census administration system at the end of 2000. The main pilot for the census was conducted in February and March 2001, all aspects of enumeration were tested. It resulted in many revisions of both processes and management methods. The 1996 census questionnaire was used as a basis, with some key differences in labour related questions. Three questionnaires were printed:

- The household questionnaire (A) could collect information for ten people in workers' hostels, student hostels, residential hotels or private residencies.
- The individual in an institution questionnaire (B) was an individual form for a person in institutions or tourist hotels, additionally it was used for the homeless.
- The institution questionnaire (C) was for the institution as a whole to provide a list of all the residents on census night, against which completed B questionnaires could be checked.

== Data Processing ==
As the 2001 Census was paper-based, an enormous amount of data needed to be converted to a digital format. The task of data processing consists of primarily four parts: data capture, post-data capture, coding and product generation.

Over 1000 temporary staff members were employed by Statistics South Africa to assist in the process. These employees worked in shifts, 7 days a week for almost 18 months. In total, 10 249 185 questionnaires were received which resulted in the generation of over 117 million images once scanned.

== Results ==
The census population results revealed 44.8 million people live in a 1,219,090 square kilometres (470,690 sq mi) area, that is 36.8 inhabitants per square kilometre (95/sq mi).

=== Demographics ===
Population change in the South Africa by race
Rank	Race	1996 Census	2001 Census	Change	Percent change
1	Black African	31,127,631	35,416,166	4,288,535 ▲	12.89% ▲
2	White	4,434,697	4,293,640	141,057 ▼	3.23% ▼
3	Coloured	3,600,446	3,994,505	394,059 ▲	10.38% ▲
4	Asian or Indian	1,045,596	1,115,467	69,871 ▲	6.47% ▲
Total population		40,583,573	44,819,778	4,236,205 ▲	9.92% ▲

Population change in the South Africa by language
Rank	First language	1996 Census	2001 Census	Change	Percent change
1	IsiZulu	9,200,144	10,677,305	1,477,161 ▲	14.86% ▲
2	IsiXhosa	7,196,118	7,907,153	711,035 ▲	9.42% ▲
3	Afrikaans	5,811,547	5,983,426	171,879 ▲	2.91% ▲
4	Sepedi	3,695,846	4,208,980	513,134 ▲	12.98% ▲
5 ▲	Setswana	3,301,774	3,677,016	375,242 ▲	10.75% ▲
6 ▼	English	3,457,467	3,673,203	215,736 ▲	6.05% ▲
7	Sesotho	3,104,197	3,555,186	450,989 ▲	13.54% ▲
8	Xitsonga	1,756,105	1,992,207	236,102 ▲	12.60% ▲
9	SiSwati	1,013,193	1,194,430	181,237 ▲	16.42% ▲
10	Tshivenda	876,409	1,021,757	145,348 ▲	15.31% ▲
11	IsiNdebele	586,961	711,821	124,860 ▲	19.23% ▲
12	Other	228,275	217,293	10,982 ▼	4.93% ▼

Population change in the South Africa by gender
Rank	Gender	1996 Census	2001 Census	Change	Percent change
1	Female	21,062,685	23,385,737	2,323,052 ▲	10.45% ▲
2	Male	19,520,887	21,434,040	1,913,153 ▲	9.34% ▲

Population change in the South Africa by province
Rank	Province	1996 Census	2001 Census	Change	Percent change
1	KwaZulu-Natal	8,417,021	9,426,017	1,008,996 ▲	11.31% ▲
2	Gauteng	7,348,423	8,837,178	1,488,755 ▲	18.40% ▲
3	Eastern Cape	6,302,525	6,436,763	134,238 ▲	2.11% ▲
4	Limpopo	4,929,368	5,273,642	344,274 ▲	6.75% ▲
5	Western Cape	3,956,875	4,524,335	567,460 ▲	13.38% ▲
6	North West	3,354,825	3,669,349	314,524 ▲	8.96% ▲
7	Mpumalanga	2,800,711	3,122,990	322,279 ▲	10.88% ▲
8	Free State	2,633,504	2,706,775	73,271 ▲	2.74% ▲
9	Northern Cape	840,321	822,727	17,594 ▼	2.16% ▼
Total population		40,583,573	44,819,778	4,236,205 ▲	9.92% ▲

== See also ==
- Official 2001 Census Website
- Census in South Africa
- South African National Census of 1996
- South African National Census of 2011
- Demographics of South Africa
