= Dutch Reformed Church, Riebeek Kasteel =

Church in Riebeek Kasteel, South Africa

Coordinates: 33.3827°S 18.8974°E

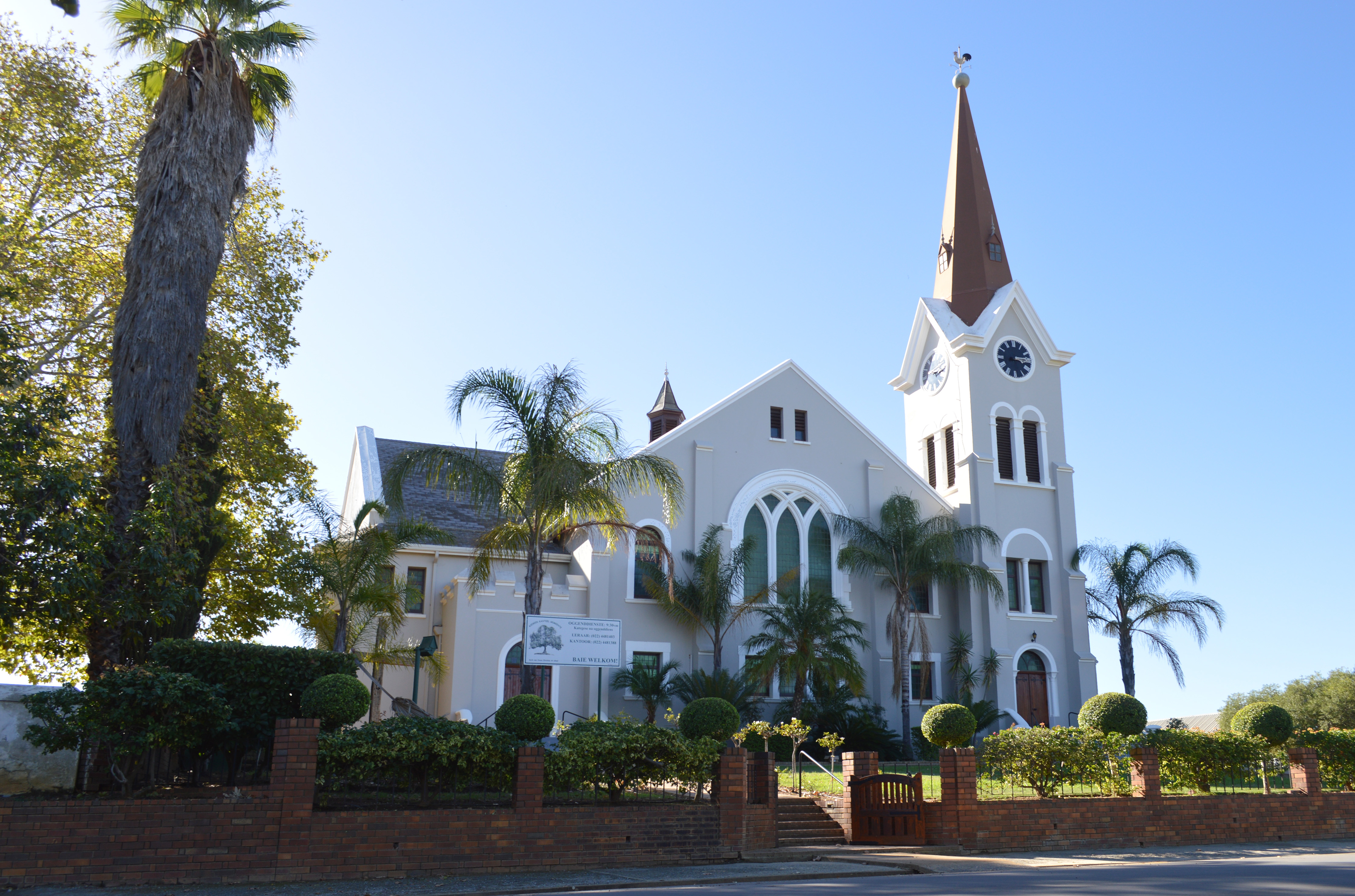

The Dutch Reformed Church in Riebeek–Kasteel is a congregation in the Dutch Reformed Church's Synod of the Western and Southern Cape with its center on the Swartland village of Riebeek-Kasteel.
