= Chatsworth, Western Cape =

Chatsworth
- Location within Western Cape Location within South Africa
- Coordinates: 33°32′46″S 18°34′58″E
- Country: South Africa
- Province: Western Cape
- District: West Coast
- Municipality: Swartland

Area
  - Total: 1.23 km^{2} (0.47 sq mi)

Population (2011)
  - Total: 2,326
  - Density: 1,890/km^{2} (4,900/sq mi)

Racial makeup (2011)
  - Black African: 9.2%
  - Coloured: 85.5%
  - Indian/Asian: 2.3%
  - White: 0.6%
  - Other: 2.3%

First languages (2011)
  - Afrikaans: 72.2%
  - English: 23.8%
  - Xhosa: 1.5%
  - Other: 2.5%
- Time zone: UTC+2 (SAST)
- Postal code (street): 7354
- PO box: 4030

Chatsworth is a settlement in West Coast District Municipality in the Western Cape province of South Africa.
