= Jakkalsfontein =

- Location within Western Cape Location within South Africa
- Coordinates: 33°24′26″S 18°15′05″E
- Country: South Africa
- Province: Western Cape
- District: West Coast
- Municipality: Swartland

Area
  - Total: 10.76 km^{2} (4.15 sq mi)

Population (2011)
  - Total: 96
  - Density: 8.9/km^{2} (23/sq mi)
- Time zone: UTC+2 (SAST)

Jakkalsfontein is a settlement in Swartland Local Municipality in the Western Cape province of South Africa, located on the West Coast R27 Road. It is located near the Jakkalsfontein Private Nature Reserve.
