= Swartland Local Municipality =

Swartland
- Local municipality
- Seal

- Location in the Western Cape
- Coordinates: 33°20′S 18°40′E
- Country: South Africa
- Province: Western Cape
- District: West Coast
- Seat: Malmesbury
- Wards: 12

Government
  - Type: Municipal council
  - Mayor: Harold Cleophas (DA)

Area
  - Total: 3,707 km^{2} (1,431 sq mi)

Population (2022)
  - Total: 148,331
  - Density: 40.01/km^{2} (103.6/sq mi)

Racial makeup (2022)
  - Black African: 18.3%
  - Coloured: 64.1%
  - Indian/Asian: 0.4%
  - White: 15.7%

First languages (2011)
  - Afrikaans: 82.8%
  - Xhosa: 8.9%
  - English: 4.7%
  - Sotho: 1.5%
  - Other: 2.1%
- Time zone: UTC+2 (SAST)
- Municipal code: WC015

Swartland Municipality (Afrikaans: Swartland Munisipaliteit) is a local municipality located in the Western Cape province of South Africa. Malmesbury is the seat of the municipality. As of 2022, it had a population of 148,331. Its municipality code is WC015.

== Geography ==
Topographic map of the Swartland Municipality

The municipality covers an area of 3,707 square kilometres (1,431 sq mi), stretching from the Atlantic Ocean in the west to the Berg River in the east. To the south it abuts on the City of Cape Town, to the east the Drakenstein Municipality, and to the north the Bergrivier Municipality and Saldanha Bay Municipality.

According to the 2022 South African census, the municipality had a population of 148,331 people. Of these, 64.1% identify as "Coloured," 18.3% as "Black Africans," and 15.7% as "White."

According to the 2016 Stats SA Community Survey the municipality has a population of 133,762 people in 39,139 households. Of this population, 65.1% describe themselves as "Coloured", 15.7% as "Black African", and 18.6% as "White". The first language of 78.13% of the population is Afrikaans, while 12.34% speak Xhosa, 5.14% speak English and 1.20% speak Sotho.

The principal town and seat of the council is Malmesbury, which is situated in the south-east of the municipality and has a population (according to the 2011 census) of 25,176. Other large towns are Moorreesburg (pop. 12,877) to the north, and Darling (pop. 10,420) to the west. In the Riebeek Valley north-east of Malmesbury are the sister towns of Riebeek-Kasteel (pop. 4,761) and Riebeek West (pop. 4,350).

In the vicinity of Malmesbury there are the smaller villages of Abbotsdale, Chatsworth, and Kalbaskraal, while in the vicinity of Moorreesburg is found the village of Koringberg. Yzerfontein on the Atlantic coast is a fishing village and holiday town.

== Economic Base ==
Malmesbury is the administrative centre of the Municipality and fulfils an important urban niche in the region and the province. Its high development potential can be attributed to factors such as its relative accessibility along the N7 road/rail corridor; closeness to Cape Town; diversified economic base, which not only accommodates agriculture but also well-developed industrial and commercial sectors; and supportive infrastructure. Malmesbury is home to a number of large companies, as well as regional offices of provincial and national government departments.

In 2016 the main contributors to the regional GDP were: Manufacturing (R1,689.0 million or 22.9%), wholesale and retail trade, catering and accommodation (R1,289.2 million or 17.5%), agriculture, forestry and fishing (R1,173.4 million or 15.9%) and general government (R851.0 million or 11.5%).

== History ==
At the end of the apartheid era, in the area that is today the Swartland Municipality there were municipal councils for Malmesbury, Moorreesburg, Darling, Riebeek-Kasteel, Riebeek West and Koringberg, and a local council for Yzerfontein. These councils were elected by the white residents, while the coloured residents of Malmesbury, Moorreesburg, Greenville (Darling), Riebeek-Kasteel (Esterhof) and Riebeek West were governed by management committees subordinate to the white councils. The remaining rural areas were served by the West Coast Regional Services Council.

While the negotiations to end apartheid were taking place a process was established for local authorities to negotiate voluntary mergers. Moorreesburg took part in this process, which resulted in the municipality merging with its management committee to form a new non-racial municipality in June 1993.

After the national elections of 1994 a process of local government transformation began, in which negotiations were held between the existing local authorities, political parties, and local community organisations. As a result of these negotiations, the existing local authorities were dissolved and transitional local councils (TLCs) were created for each town and village. In December 1994 Darling TLC replaced Darling Municipality and Greenville Management Committee. In January 1995 Malmesbury TLC replaced the municipalities of Malmesbury, Riebeek-Kasteel and Riebeek West, as well as their respective management committees. In the same month Moorreesburg TLC replaced the merged Moorreesburg Municipality. In October 1995 Koringberg Municipality and Yzerfontein Local Council were each converted to TLCs.

The transitional councils were initially made up of members nominated by the various parties to the negotiations, until May 1996 when elections were held. At these elections the West Coast District Council was established, replacing the West Coast Regional Services Council. Transitional representative councils (TRCs) were also elected to represent rural areas outside the TLCs on the District Council; the area that was to become Swartland Municipality included much of the Malmesbury TRC and a small part of the Paarl TRC.

At the local elections of December 2000 the TLCs and TRCs were dissolved and the Swartland Municipality was established as a single local authority incorporating both rural and urban areas.

== Politics ==
The municipal council consists of twenty-three members elected by mixed-member proportional representation. Twelve councillors are elected by first-past-the-post voting in twelve wards, while the remaining eleven are chosen from party lists so that the total number of party representatives is proportional to the number of votes received.

In the election of 4 November 2026 the Democratic Alliance (DA) obtained a majority of fourteen seats on the council..

The following table shows the results of the 2026 election.

Party	Ward			List			Total seats
Party	Votes	%	Seats	Votes	%	Seats	Total seats
Democratic Alliance	18,285	60.23	10	18,739	61.23	4	14
Patriotic Alliance	4,909	16.17	1	4,659	15.22	3	4
African National Congress	3,489	11.49	1	3,481	11.37	2	3
Freedom Front Plus	2,068	6.81	0	2,167	7.08	2	2
Independent candidates	57	0.19	0				0
10 other parties	1,553	5.12	0	1,557	5.09	0	0
Total	30,361	100.00	12	30,603	100.00	11	23
Valid votes	30,361	99.29		30,603	99.31		
Invalid/blank votes	216	0.71		214	0.69		
Total votes	30,577	100.00		30,817	100.00		
Registered voters/turnout	58,703	52.09		58,703	52.50		
