= Glenn Mena =

Nigerian singer and songwriter

- Also known as: Glenn Mena
- Born: Akauveh Erumena Glenn; July 22, 1985 (age 40); Delta State, Nigeria
- Genres: Afropop; African hip hop; hip hop
- Occupations: Singer, songwriter
- Instrument: Piano
- Years active: 2012–present
- Labels: Mask and Music Group
- Spouse: Stella N. Akarah
- Website: maskandmusic.com

Akauveh Erumena Glenn (born July 22, 1985), stage name Glenn Mena, is a Nigerian singer, songwriter, and instrumentalist.

== Personal life ==
Glenn Mena is the second son of five siblings, born to Meshach Akauveh Akarah and Regina I. Akarah. He is a Business Administration graduate from Lead City University, Ibadan. On 6th June, 2024, the singer embraced fatherhood with the birth of his daughter, Heaven O. Akarah with his longtime partner, Stella N. Akarah.

== Career ==
Mena began making music with a friend in secondary school.

He was nominated for a City People Entertainment Award. At the 2013 MAYA Awards he was the winner of the "Best New Act" category, and the same song won him another nomination in the "Next Rated Act" category at the 2015 Scream All Youths Awards.

In 2015, he released a single titled "Packaging". In January 2017, he was featured on TV presenter Shine Begho's Mischief Show, where he hinted at the release of his first EP, Mask&Music. In August 2017, he released the low-tempo song "Take Over” which was produced by American producer Nino Fresh. In 2018, he released the single "Swerve".

On 20 June 2019, Mena had his first international feature as he premièred his new single "Yoruba Demon" on Complex Magazine. The single, which features Problem Solved, is off the singer's upcoming album.

== Discography ==
As lead artist
Year	Title	Album
2012	"Movement"	Non-album single
2015	"Packaging"	Non-album single
2017	The Mask&Music EP project (Cut one)	Mixtape
2017	"Take Over"	Non-album single
2018	"Swerve" (featuring Problem Solved)	
2018	"Pull Up" (featuring Dremo)	
2020	"Yoruba Demon" (featuring Problem Solved)	
2020	"KOLA"	
2021	"Warri Boy" (Featuring Erigga)	
2023	"Standard" (Featuring Trilly)	
2025	Night Bus	Album

== Awards and nominations ==
Year	Awards ceremony	Award description(s)	Recipient	Results	Ref
2013	MAYA Awards	Best New Act	Himself	Won	
2013	City People Awards	New Act	Himself	Nominated	
2015	Scream All Youths Awards	Next Rated Act	Himself	Nominated	
