= Zimbabweans in South Africa =

Total population
- +- 1,000,000

Regions with significant populations
- Urban Areas: Johannesburg, Pretoria, Cape Town, Durban, Pietermaritzburg, Port Elizabeth, East London Rural Areas: Limpopo, Mpumalanga, Western Cape, Gauteng and Free State.

Languages
- South African English; Afrikaans; Ndebele; Shona

Religion
- Christianity mostly Roman Catholicism and Protestantism.

Related ethnic groups
- Zimbabwean diaspora, White Zimbabweans

There is a significant population of Zimbabweans in South Africa, making up South Africa's largest group of foreign migrants. Estimates of their numbers range from one to five million.

== History ==
Temporary labour migration to South Africa has long been a feature of Rhodesian and then Zimbabwean society. A 2002 survey by the Southern African Migration Project showed that almost 25% of adult Zimbabweans' parents or grandparents had worked in South Africa at some point in their lives. Zimbabweans who went to South Africa in the then Rhodesia were largely black males who sought employment in mostly in the South African mines. Immigrant labour at this time was much more preferable to the apartheid government of South Africa as it was much cheaper to hire workers from Zimbabwe and other neighbouring countries. Some Zimbabweans who went to South Africa at this time decided not to go back to Zimbabwe, deciding to marry locally and settling there permanently. However, permanent emigration is a relatively new phenomenon.

There have been three major waves of emigration from Zimbabwe. The first was that of white people in Zimbabwe who left the country soon after the Lancaster House Agreement ended the Zimbabwe Rhodesia government. Some whites decided that South Africa was a more secure environment for their investments as they did not trust the new black government that was preaching socialist idealist theories at the time of independence. The second was that of ethnic Zimbabweans known as Gukurahundi, beginning in the 1990s. In this particular case the Ndebele people fled the country to seek refuge in neighboring South Africa. The third was triggered by the economic woes in the country in year 2000 and beyond. These woes were social, political and economic. They culminated in enactment of the Fast Track Land Program, hyperinflation and poor living standards in the country. In all cases, South Africa was again their primary destination.

From 1994 onwards, the South African government displayed increasing hostility to skilled immigration from the rest of Africa. However, this has not served to limit the number of immigrants; Zimbabwean migration to South Africa since 2000 has been described as the "largest concentrated flow" in the country's history. This displeasure at the large number of Zimbabweans who were taking menial jobs from the locals led to xenophobic attacks across the country. Migrants previously consisted of young people arriving alone to look for work, but since 2000 have increasingly shifted towards women, children, and the elderly who are not able to work and require humanitarian assistance. Migrants also now include professionals like teachers, doctors, nurses and engineers who have applied to stay in the country legally through visa applications in critical skills areas. These Zimbabweans have contributed positively towards the economy of the country. A large number of Zimbabweans in South Africa has also sought political and economic asylum. The South African government has also created special visas for Zimbabweans who had previously been undocumented to regulate their stay.

A large proportion of the migrants are illegal; they typically pay people smugglers to take them across the Limpopo River at night and coordinate with taxi drivers who transport the migrants to Johannesburg and watch for the approach of police or soldiers.

== Numbers and distribution ==
Estimates of the number of Zimbabwean migrants to South Africa around 800 000. Exact figures are difficult to obtain due to the large proportion of undocumented migrants. There was some return migration to Zimbabwe as a result of xenophobic violence in the 2008 riots.

== Features ==
There are estimated to be between eight hundred thousand and one million Zimbabweans in South Africa as of 2018. Migration between the two countries has been a feature throughout the 20th century, traditionally with mostly white South Africans moving north and black Zimbabwean workers temporarily heading south. Beginning in the 1980s, the tide began to turn in favor of South Africa and with large scale emigration a feature since 2000. Today, Zimbabweans in South Africa have faced a tougher time there than in other countries, with many working class and poorer migrants facing xenophobic violence and crime in the country. Additionally, while it is easier to settle in South Africa than in previous years, the government still makes naturalizing as a South African citizen very difficult.

Ironically, Zimbabwean immigrants are the most similar to native South Africans of all major foreign immigrants in the country, and they easily adapt to their new place of residence, due to similarities in environment, culture, lifestyle, language and their relatively higher education levels. Indeed, most immigrants that arrived prior to Zimbabwe's economic crisis in the 2000s, would often assimilate readily in South African society.

Zimbabwean immigration has been accompanied the ups and downs suffered by the country in recent decades in terms of political and economic instability.

However, Zimbabweans still face significant challenges in South Africa, with working class and poorer migrants disproportionately suffering from discrimination and xenophobic violence. The South African Government's perceived indifference to the the plight of Zimbabwe and Zimbabweans, in addition to a relatively high crime rate, has resulted in many Zimbabweans preferring emigration to countries such as the United Kingdom, Australia, Canada, New Zealand and Ireland, which may offer greater economic opportunities, with less discrimination and crime than South Africa.

Despite this numerous academics, students, athletes, journalists, artists and professionals stand out within the Zimbabwean community in South Africa.

== Notable people ==
- Albert Luthuli – activist, politician and Nobel Prize winner
- Trevor Ncube, businessman
- Roy Bennett, former parliamentarian who received asylum in South Africa in May 2007 (died in January 2018)
- Peter Ndoro – broadcaster
- Bobby Skinstad- former Springboks rugby player
- Tawana Kupe – university vice-chancellor and principal
- Tendai 'Beast' Mtawarira – professional Springboks rugby player and World Cup winner
- Gary Teichmann – former Springboks rugby player
- Brad Barritt- former England and Saracens rugby player
- Heidi Holland – journalist
- Barry Hilton – comedian
- Kotaro Matsushima - professional rugby player
- Mpumelelo Mbangwa – cricket commentator
