= Kalbaskraal =

- Location within Western Cape Location within South Africa
- Coordinates: 33°34′S 18°39′E
- Country: South Africa
- Province: Western Cape
- District: West Coast
- Municipality: Swartland

Government
  - Councillor: CLLR MEC

Area
  - Total: 1.38 km^{2} (0.53 sq mi)

Population (2011)
  - Total: 2,411
  - Density: 1,750/km^{2} (4,520/sq mi)

Racial makeup (2011)
  - Black African: 23.4%
  - Coloured: 65.4%
  - Indian/Asian: 0.2%
  - White: 9.5%
  - Other: 1.4%

First languages (2011)
  - Afrikaans: 75.6%
  - Xhosa: 12.7%
  - English: 7.8%
  - Sotho: 1.7%
  - Other: 2.1%
- Time zone: UTC+2 (SAST)
- Postal code (street): 7302
- PO box: 7302

Kalbaskraal is a settlement in the Swartland Local Municipality in the Western Cape province of South Africa. It was established in 1898 at the site of a railway junction for the narrow gauge railway to Hopefield and eventually Saldanha.
