= Abbotsdale =

- Location within Western Cape Location within South Africa
- Coordinates: 33°29′13″S 18°40′33″E
- Country: South Africa
- Province: Western Cape
- District: West Coast
- Municipality: Swartland

Area
  - Total: 8.70 km^{2} (3.36 sq mi)

Population (2011)
  - Total: 3,762
  - Density: 432/km^{2} (1,120/sq mi)

Racial makeup (2011)
  - Black African: 4.2%
  - Coloured: 95.3%
  - Indian/Asian: 0.2%
  - White: 0.2%
  - Other: 0.2%

First languages (2011)
  - Afrikaans: 92.8%
  - English: 3.1%
  - Xhosa: 2.7%
  - Other: 1.4%
- Time zone: UTC+2 (SAST)
- Postal code (street): 7300

Abbotsdale is a settlement in West Coast District Municipality Swartland Municipality in the Western Cape province of South Africa.

Here in around 1854 the Abbotsdale Mission was founded on a 1600 acre farm purchased by Bishop Gray of the Anglican Church.
