= Somalis in South Africa =

- (Somalia) (South Africa)

Total population
- 24,000 including refugees, immigrants and asylum seekers

Regions with significant populations
- Johannesburg, Pretoria, Cape Town and Durban, some rural areas of Western Cape, Gauteng and Limpopo.

Languages
- Somali, South African English, Arabic, Afrikaans and other Languages of South Africa

Religion
- Islam

Related ethnic groups
- Somalis, Cushitic people

Somalis in South Africa are residents of South Africa who are of Somali descent. The earliest communities were formed in Cape Town and surrounding areas in the late nineties and early 2000s. A number of Somali-South African residents have risen to prominence locally and internationally.

== Overview ==
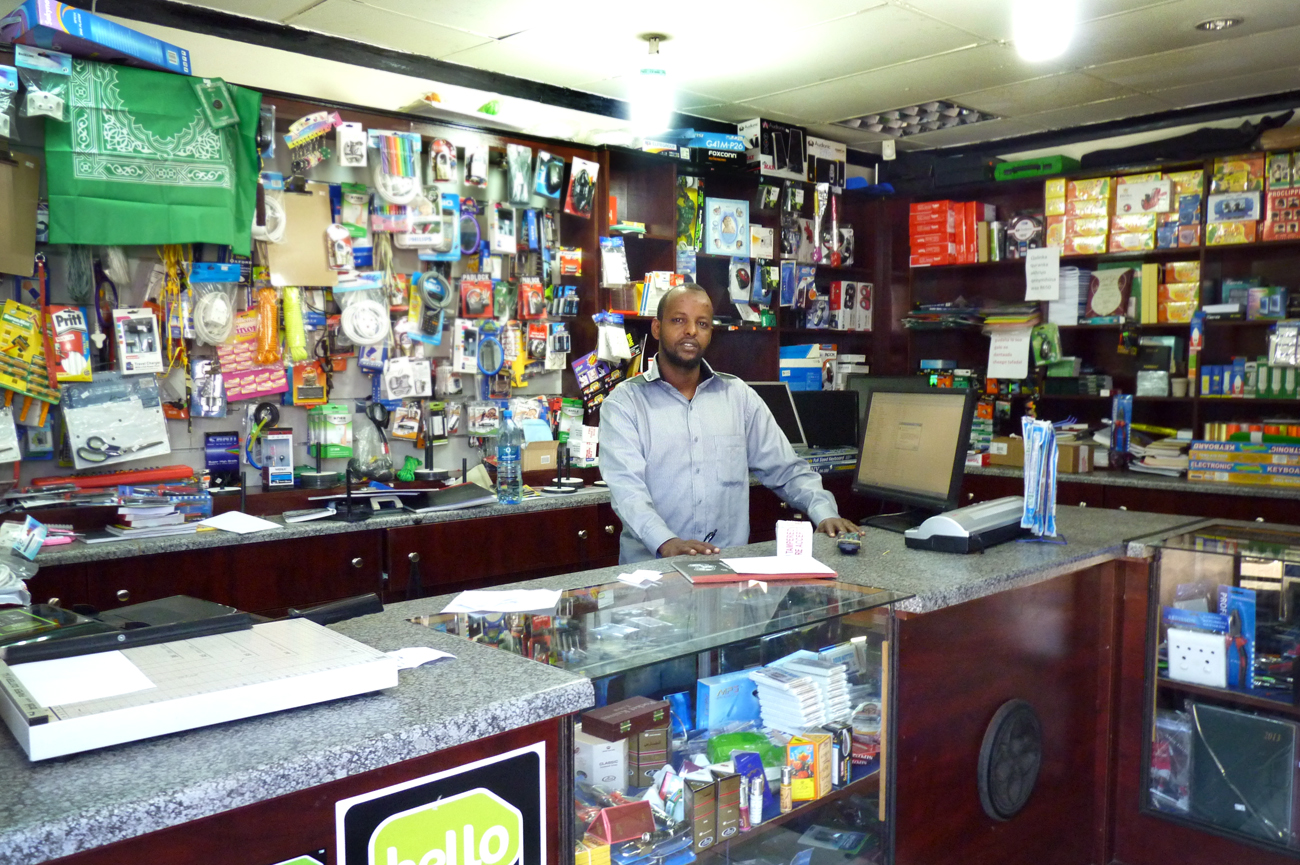
A Somali convenience store in Mayfair, Johannesburg.

Following the civil war in Somalia that broke out in 1991, a number of Somalis emigrated to South Africa. They soon established themselves in the commercial sector, creating employment opportunities for themselves and opening their own stores.

Somali businesses have offered goods to customers at lower prices than their local competitors, cornering the market in many areas. By 2010, Somali entrepreneurs provided most of the retail trade in informal settlements around the Western Cape province, among other places. Somali-owned convenience shops selling products like snacks, soft drinks and clothing have been especially successful.

In 2008, xenophobic riots against immigrants broke out in the Western Cape province, displacing some 20,000 foreign nationals. The Somali community's insular nature reportedly helped protect it from the worst of the violence. However, many Somali-owned stores and supermarkets were destroyed and looted.

Concurrently, Somali traders and establishments have become increasingly targeted for violence and robbery. The willingness of many Somali merchants to work anywhere, including run-down townships, has facilitated the attacks. Although South African business people envious of the Somalis' entrepreneurial success have been blamed for fomenting the hostilities, most of the incidents have been linked to criminals and "tsotsis" (gangsters) working on behalf of local community leaders.

== Culture ==
Somalis in South Africa have formed a unified ethnic network, largely keeping to themselves. A Muslim population, they marry within their own community and seek to preserve their culture. Their customs, physical appearance and religious background distinguish them from other residents.

== Demographics ==
As of 2015, there were an estimated 70,000 Somalis living in South Africa.

== Community organizations ==
The Somali community in South Africa is represented by the Somali Association of South Africa (SASA), chaired by Hanad Mohamed. According to the organization, following a greatly ameliorated political situation in Somalia in 2012, some Somali immigrants have started again repatriating back to their native country for the first time in ten years.

Somalis in South Africa are diplomatically represented by the embassy of Somalia in Pretoria. The office is intended to protect the interests and rights of Somali expatriates in the country, to tap into new commercial opportunities for Somali businesspeople, and to strengthen diplomatic representation in the region.

Due to the conservative nature of the Somali community, tribalism is still very much prevalent, being the most common representative of the community. However, there seems to be a decline in tribal interest amongst first generation Somali South Africans— who consider themselves South Africans.

== See also ==
- Somali diaspora
