= Pali Lehohla =

South African politician

The Honourable Pali Lehohla former Statistician-General of South Africa
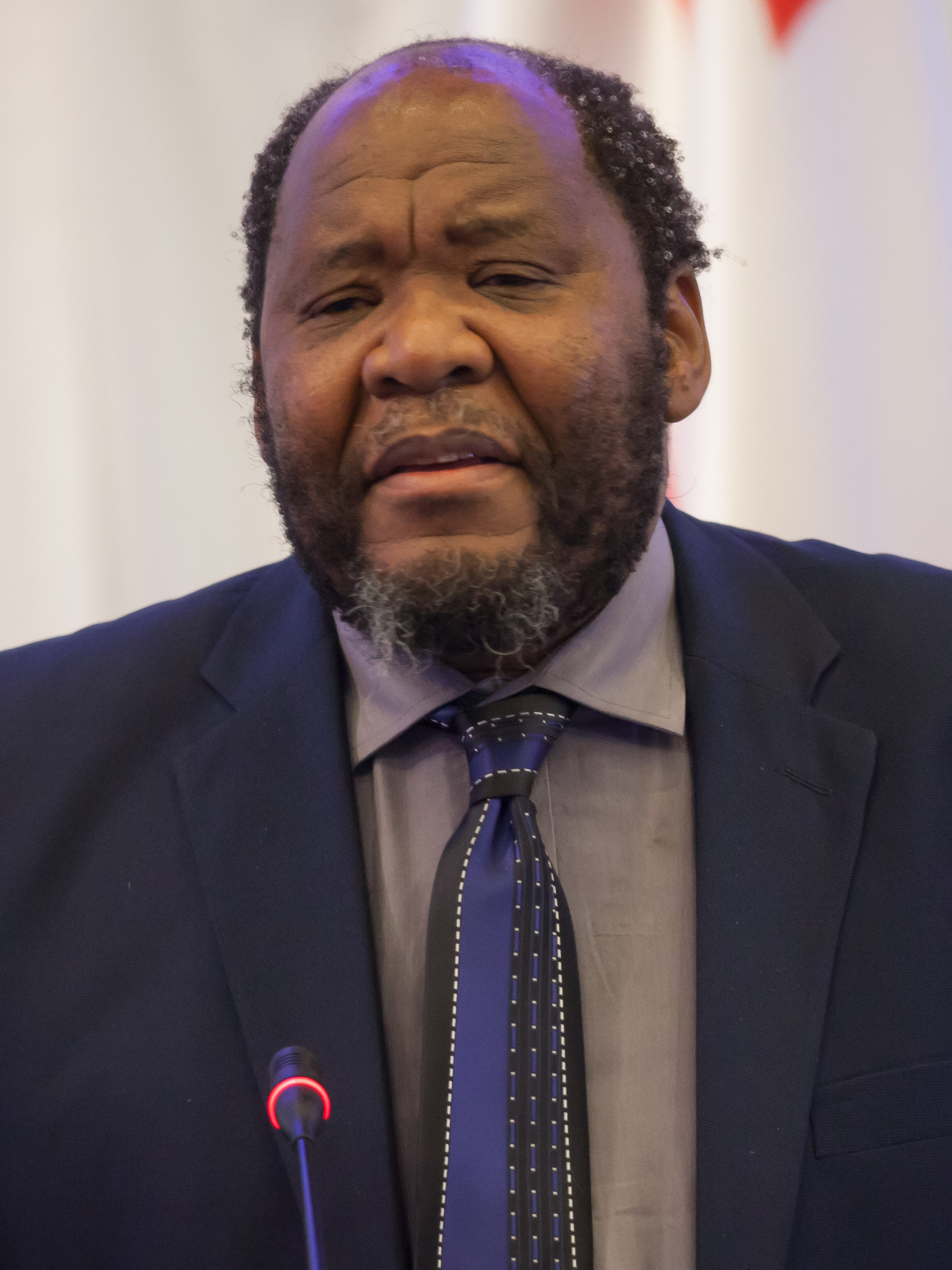
- Lehohla in 2014

Statistician-General of South Africa
- In office 1 March 2000 – 1 March 2017
- President: Cyril Ramaphosa
- Succeeded by: Risenga Maluleke

Personal details
- Born: Pali Lehohla; 27 September 1957 (age 69)
- Party: African National Congress
- Education: University of Stellenbosch; University of Ghana; University of Pretoria; University of Lesotho
- Occupation: Politician; trade union leader; educator; Board Chairman at Suppple Group

Pali Lehohla (born 27 September 1957) is a South African analyst and public educator who was the former Statistician-General of South Africa from 2000 and the chair of Africa Symposium for Statistical Development (ASSD). He previously served as chair of the United Nations Statistics Commission, as well as Chair of Statistics Commission Africa. Lehohla currently serves as Chairman of the Board of Directors of UK - South Africa incorporated, and Luxembourg Stock Exchange listed AI technology company Suppple Group with a market capitalization of £200 million (R4.8 billion)

== Early life and education ==
Lehohla was born on 27 September 1957. He has an honorary doctorate from the University of Stellenbosch, Certificate of Toponymy from University of Pretoria and a Bachelor of Arts from the University of Lesotho. In the early 1990s, he worked with United Nations Statistics Commission and chair for the Sub-Group on Harmonization of Statistics in Africa, as well as the chief advisor to the Monitoring and Evaluation Committee (MOC) of the 2008 Population and Housing Census of Sudan.
