= Riebeek-Kasteel =

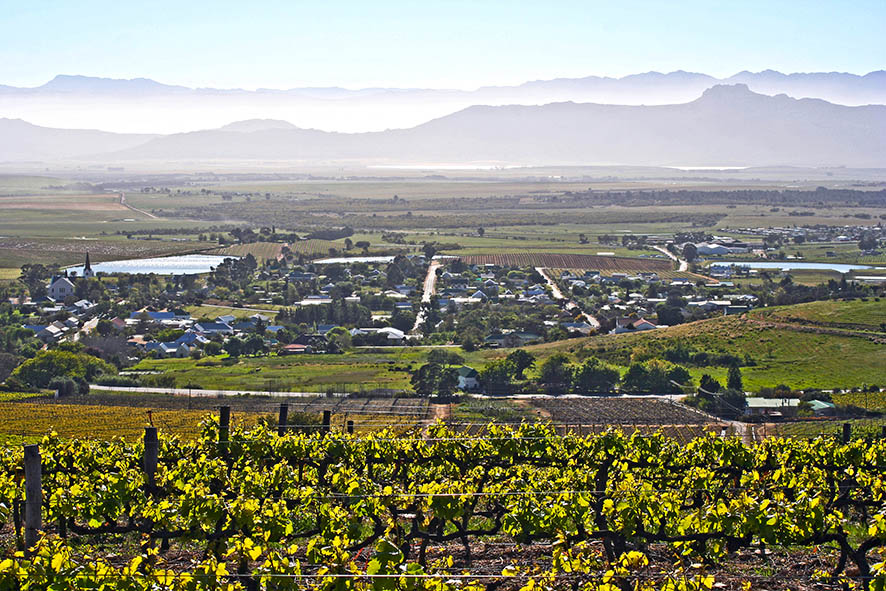
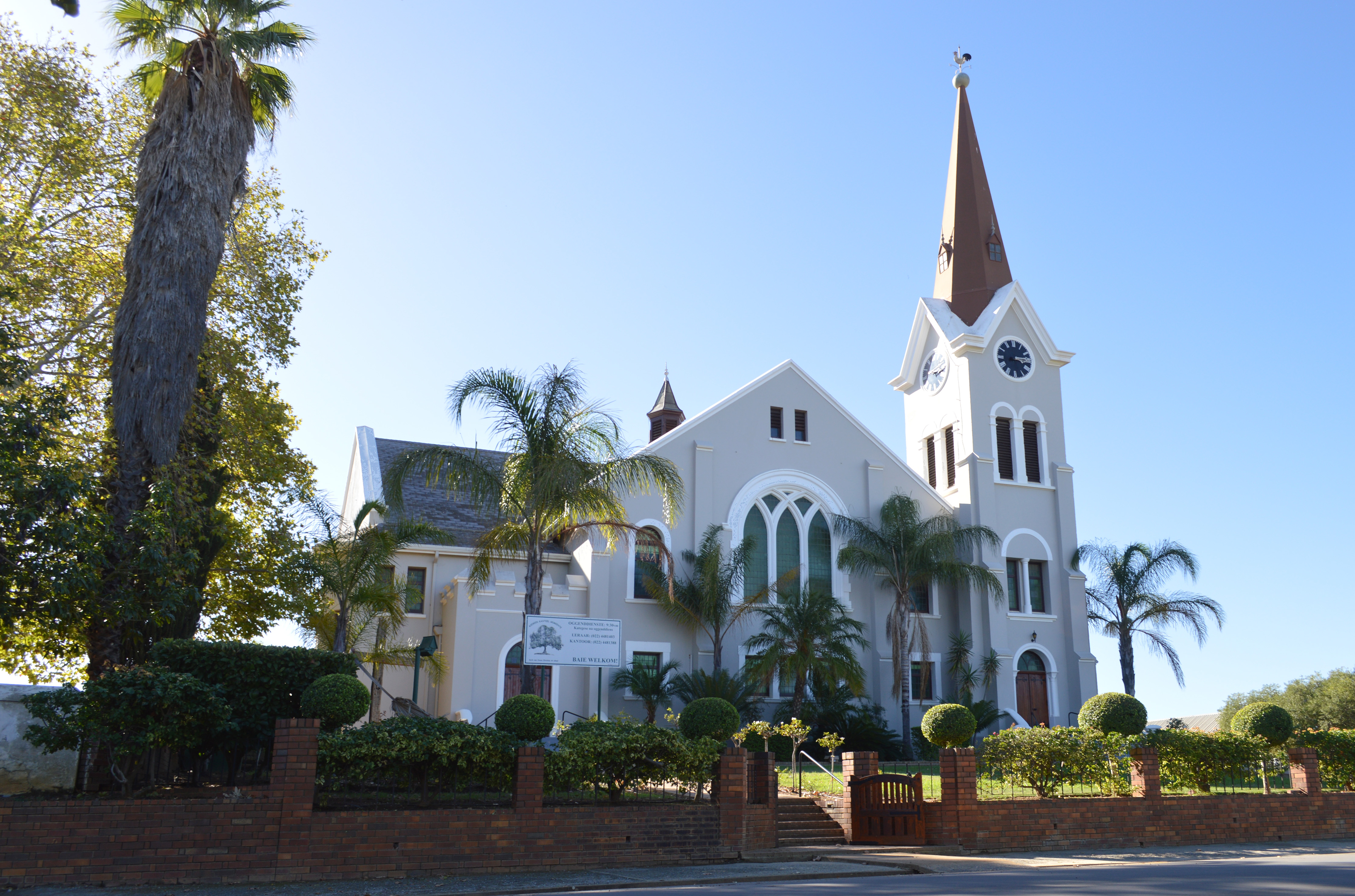
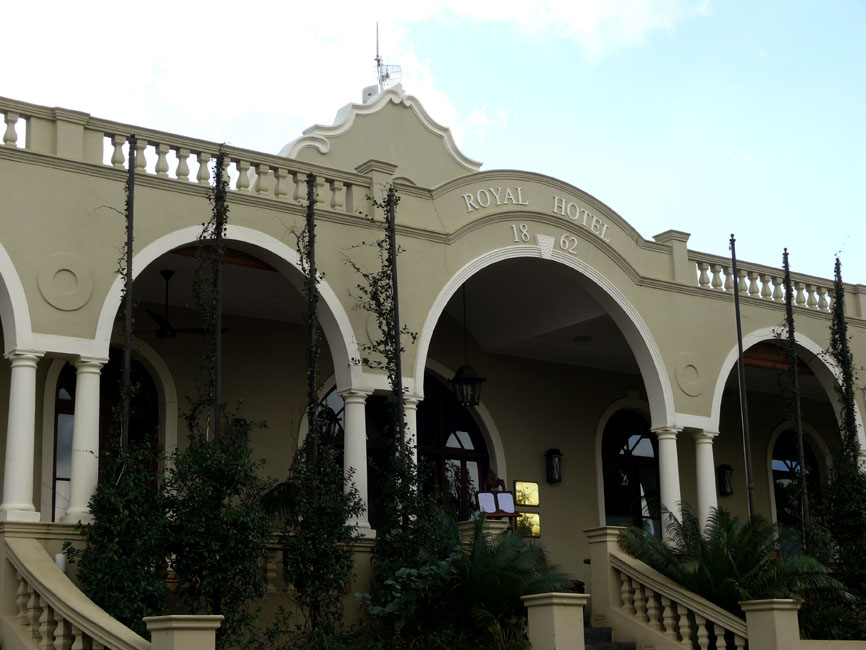
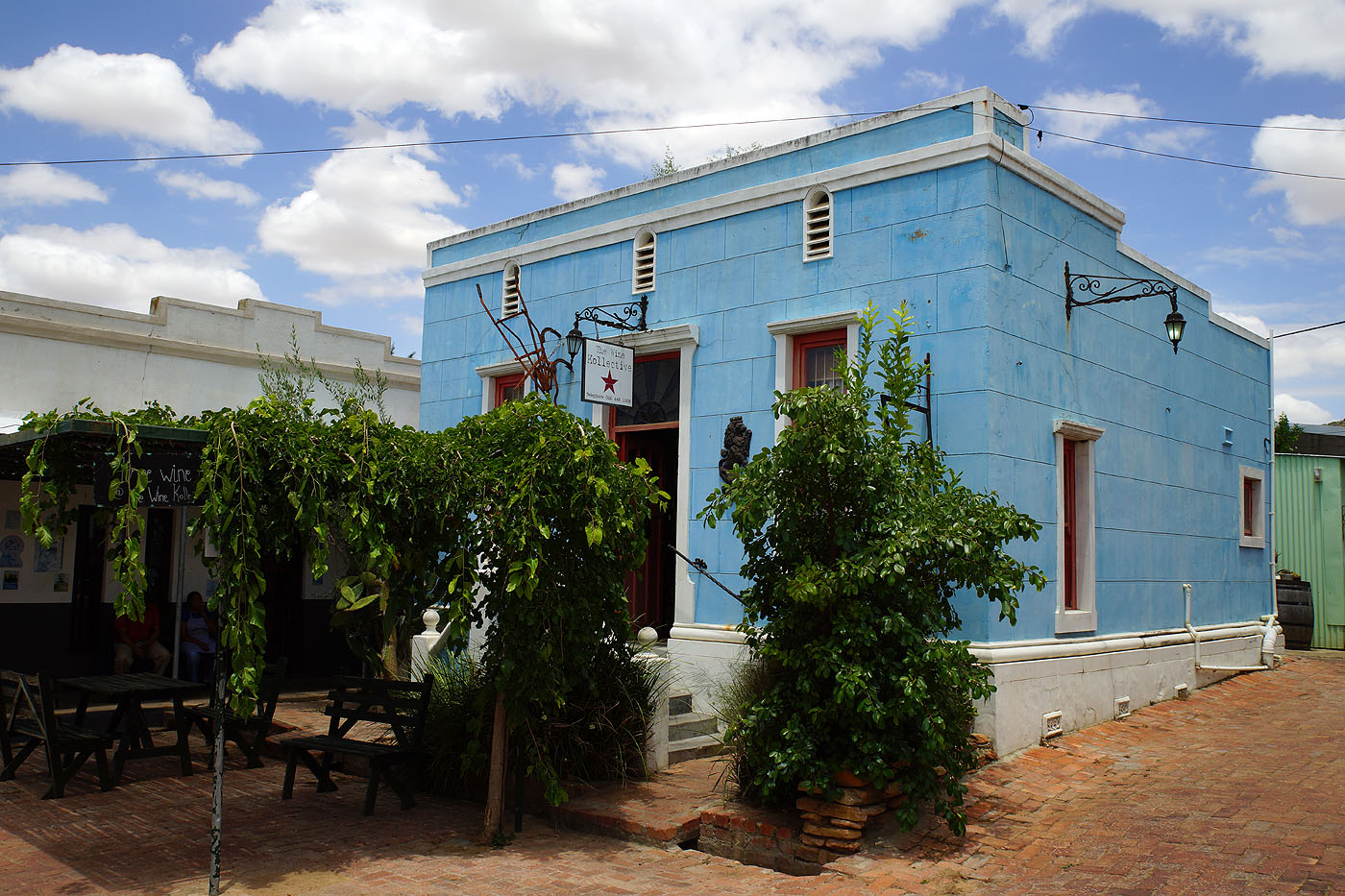
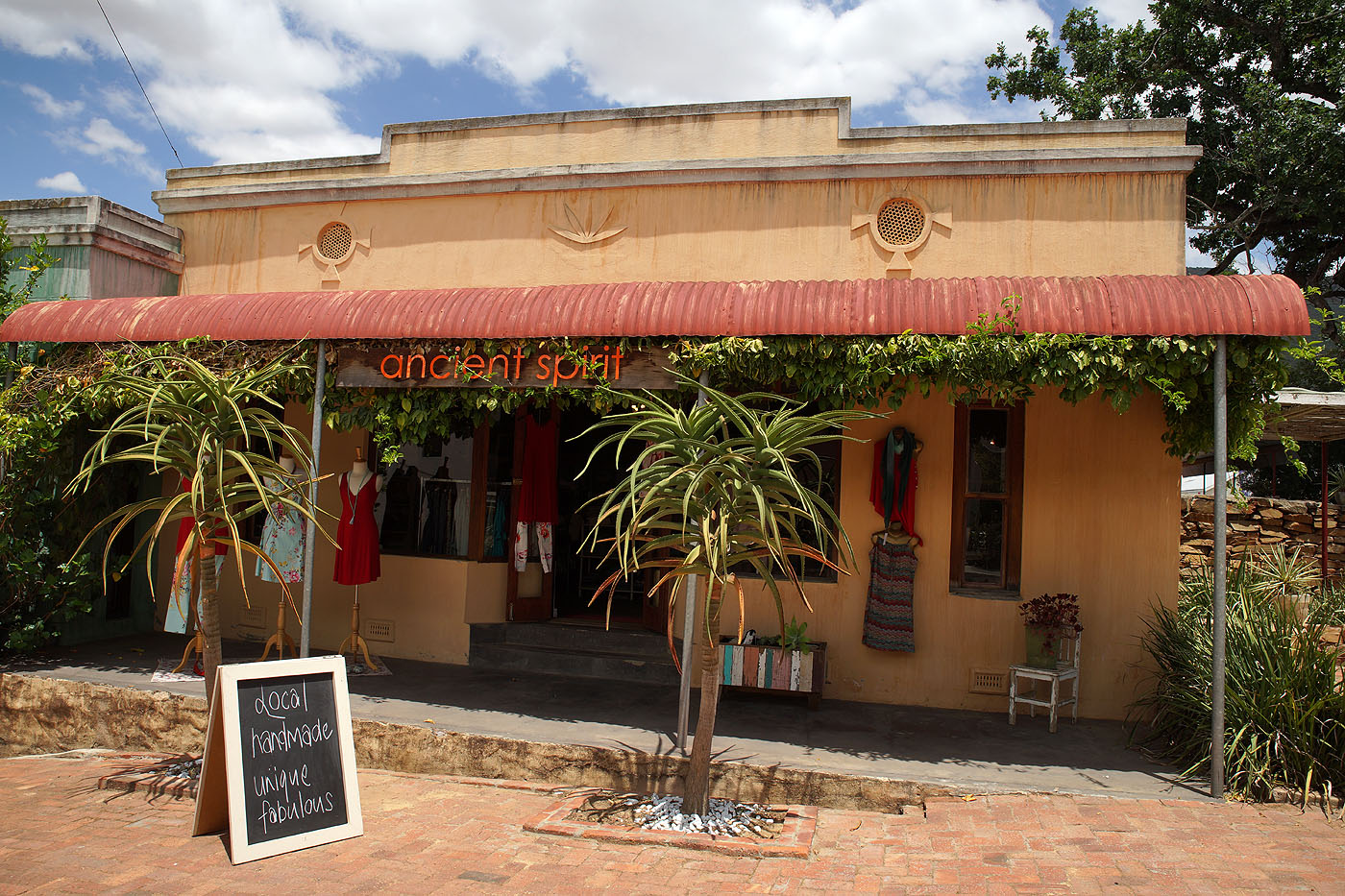
- From top, an aerial view of the town. Left, view of the Dutch Reformed Church. Right, the Royal Hotel. Bottom, old shops in Riebeek-Kasteel.

- Location within Western Cape Location within South Africa
- Coordinates: 33°23′7.21″S 18°53′54.65″E
- Country: South Africa
- Province: Western Cape
- District: West Coast
- Municipality: Swartland

Government
  - Councillor: Desiree Bess (DA)

Area
  - Total: 6.39 km^{2} (2.47 sq mi)

Population (2011)
  - Total: 1,144
  - Density: 179/km^{2} (464/sq mi)

Racial makeup (2011)
  - White: 61.42%
  - Coloured: 30.62%
  - Black African: 6.56%
  - Indian/Asian: 0.09%
  - Other: 1.31%

First languages (2011)
  - Afrikaans: 78.62%
  - English: 18.40%
  - Other: 2.98
- Time zone: UTC+2 (SAST)
- Postal code (street): 7307
- Area code: 022

Riebeek-Kasteel (Afrikaans: [ˈribiək kasˈtiəl]) is one of the oldest towns in South Africa, situated at 80 km north-east of Cape Town in The Riebeek Valley together with its sister town Riebeek West. They set off in the direction of Paardeberg and on 3 February 1661 they ascended a lonely mountain and came upon the fertile vista of the Riebeek Valley. They named it Riebeek Kasteel, in honor of the Commander.

Jan Smuts was born in Bovenplaatz, near Riebeek West, on 24 May 1870. Daniel Malan was born in 1874 in Riebeeck West. Both men later became prime ministers of South Africa.

Subsequently, farmers established themselves in the valley and during 1900 the town was laid out in and around its existing church and its neighbor The Royal Hotel, the oldest hotel in South Africa. The town eventually developed and today it houses more or less 2700 residents including some of South Africa's most famous painters, attracted by the picturesque surroundings of the valley.

The town also serves as a satellite, a residential settlement for Paarl, Malmesbury and even the Cape Town Metropolitan area.

In 2009 Riebeek-Kasteel was chosen one of the three most beautiful towns of the Western Cape by the newspaper "Rapport". The other two finalists were Stellenbosch and Clanwilliam.

== Sources ==
- Swartland Municipality
- Riebeek Valley Handbook
