= 1996 South African census =

1996 National Census
- 9 October 1996

General information
- Country: Republic of South Africa

Results
- Total population: 40,583,573 (▲30.9%)
- Most populous region: KwaZulu-Natal
- Least populous region: Northern Cape

The National Census of 1996 was the 1st comprehensive national census of the Republic of South Africa, after the end of Apartheid. It undertook to enumerate every person present in South Africa on the census night at a cost of R 419,000,000.

== Pre-enumeration ==
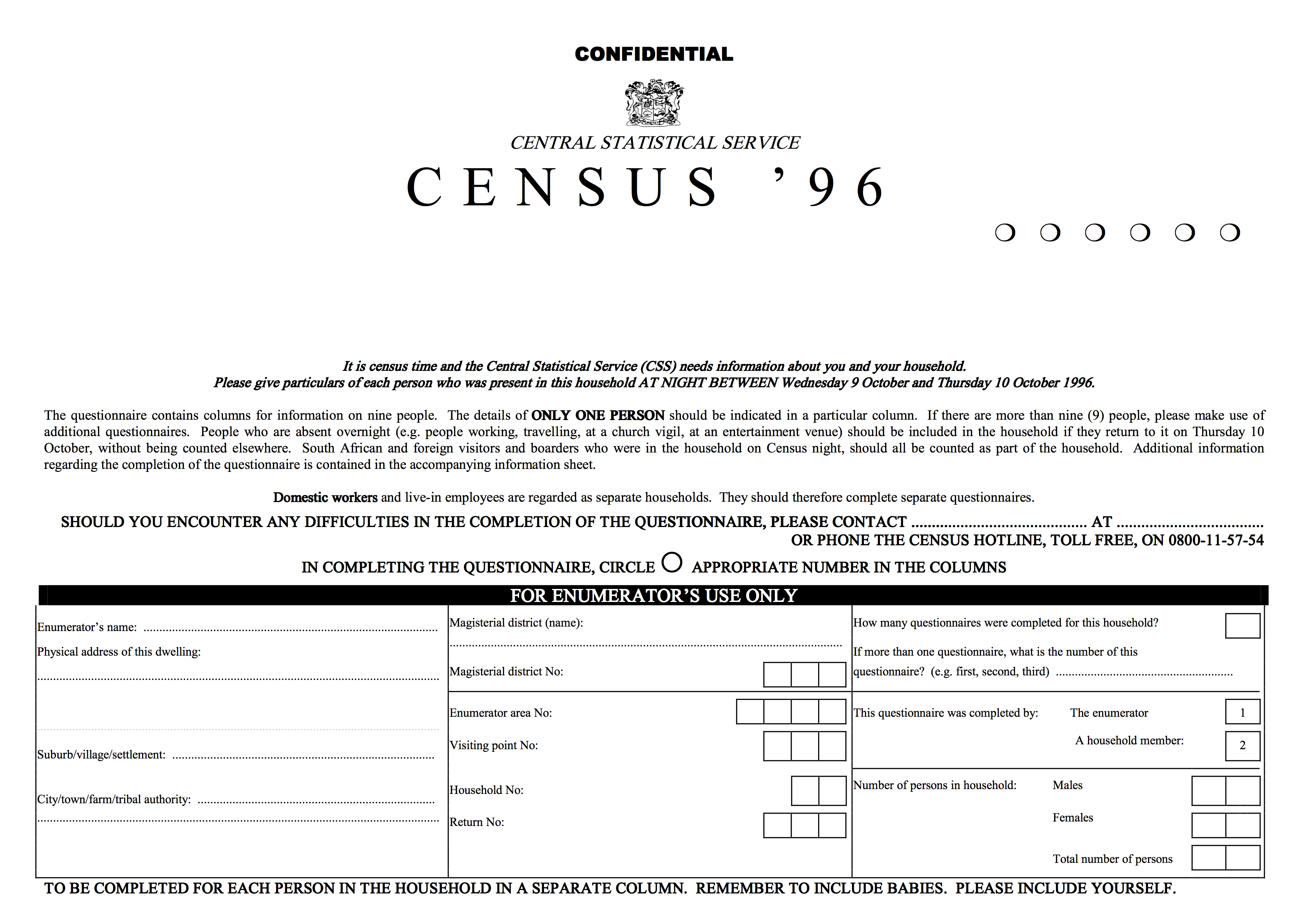
Personal questionnaire

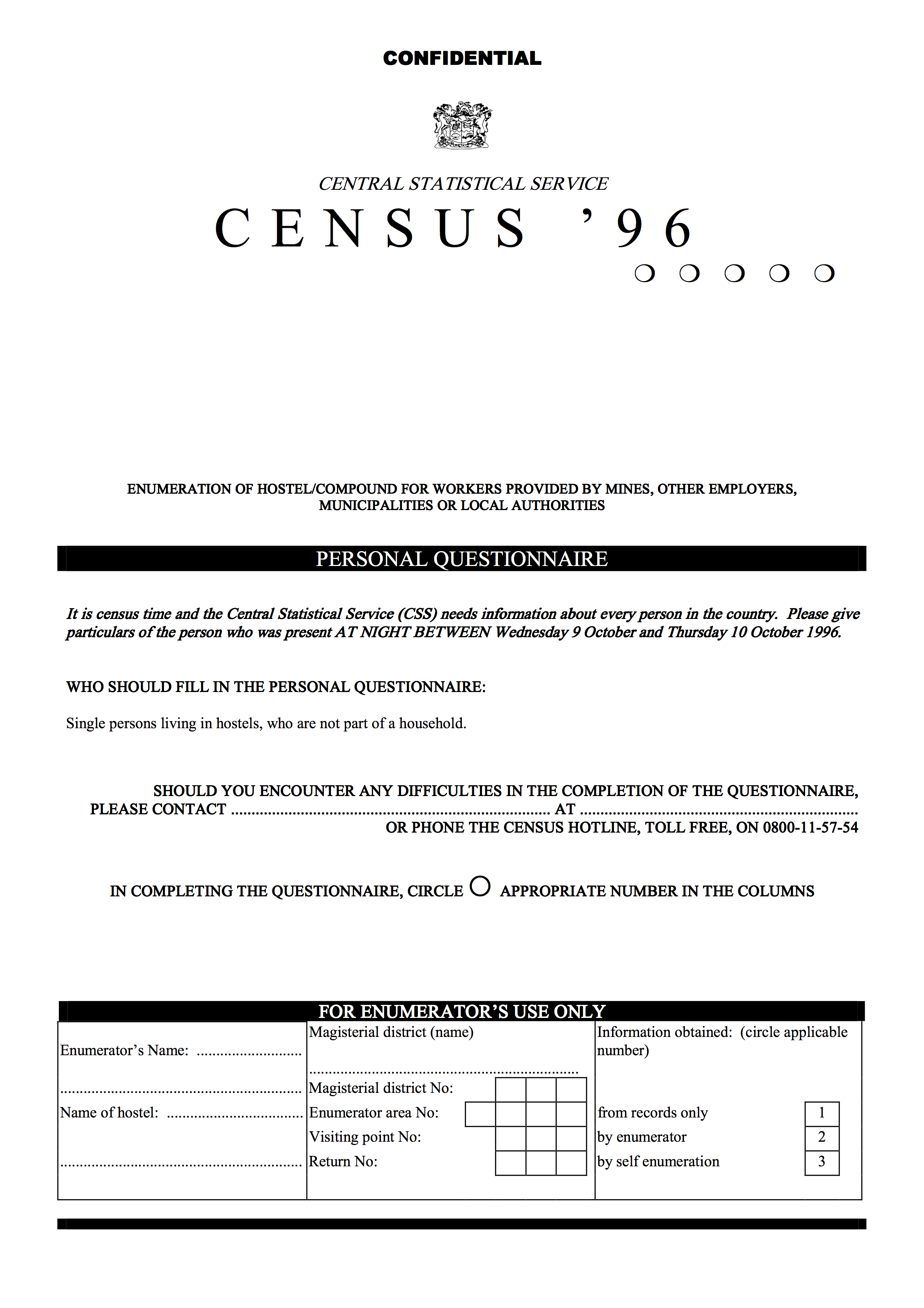
Institution questionnaire

== Results ==
=== Demographics ===
Population change in the South Africa by race
Rank	Race	1991 Census	1996 Census	Difference	Percent difference
1	Black African	21,646,000	31,127,631	▲9,481,631	▲43.8%
2	White	5,068,000	4,434,697	▼633,303	▼12.4%
3	Coloured	3,286,000	3,600,446	▲314,446	▲9.5%
4	Asian or Indian	987,000	1,045,596	▲58,596	▲5.9%
Total population		30,987,000	40,583,573	▲9,596,573	▲30.9%

Population group by province (percentages)
First language	Eastern Cape	Free State	Gauteng	KwaZulu-Natal	Mpumalanga	Northern Cape	Northern Province	North West	Western Cape	South Africa
Black African	86.4	84.4	70	81.7	89.2	33.2	96.7	91.2	20.9	76.7
Coloured	7.4	3	3.8	1.4	0.7	51.8	0.2	1.4	54.2	8.9
Asian or Indian	0.3	0.1	2.2	9.4	0.5	0.3	0.1	0.3	1	2.6
White	5.2	12	23.2	6.6	9	13.3	2.4	6.6	20.8	10.9
Unspecified/Other	0.6	0.4	0.8	0.8	0.6	1.5	0.7	0.5	3.1	0.9
Total	100	100	100	100	100	100	100	100	100	100

Population change in the South Africa by language
Rank	First language	1991 Census	1996 Census	Difference	Percent Difference
1	IsiZulu		9,200,144		%
2	IsiXhosa		7,196,118		%
3	Afrikaans		5,811,547		%
4	Sepedi		3,695,846		%
5	Setswana		3,301,774		%
6	English		3,457,467		%
7	Sesotho		3,104,197		%
8	Xitsonga		1,756,105		%
9	SiSwati		1,013,193		%
10	Tshivenda		876,409		%
11	IsiNdebele		586,961		%
12	Other		228,275		%

Population change in the South Africa by gender
Rank	Gender	1991 Census	1996 Census	Difference	Percent difference
1	Female	15,507,000	21,062,685	▲5,755,685	▲37.1%
2	Male	15,480,000	19,520,887	▲4,040,887	▲26.1%

Population change in the South Africa by province
Rank	Province	1991 Census	1996 Census	Difference	Percent difference
1	KwaZulu-Natal		8,417,021		%
2	Gauteng		7,348,423		%
3	Eastern Cape		6,302,525		%
4	Limpopo		4,929,368		%
5	Western Cape		3,956,875		%
6	North West		3,354,825		%
7	Mpumalanga		2,800,711		%
8	Free State		2,633,504		%
9	Northern Cape		840,321		%
Total population			40,583,573		%

Home language by province (percentages)
First language	Eastern Cape	Free State	Gauteng	KwaZulu-Natal	Mpumalanga	Northern Cape	Northern Province	North West	Western Cape	South Africa
Afrikaans	9.6	14.5	16.7	1.6	8.3	69.3	2.2	7.5	59.2	14.4
English	3.7	1.3	13.0	15.8	2.0	2.4	0.4	1.0	20.3	8.6
IsiNdebele	0	0.2	1.6	0	12.5	0	1.5	1.3	0.1	1.5
IsiXhosa	83.8	9.4	7.5	1.6	1.3	6.3	0.2	54.4	19.1	17.9
IsiZulu	0.4	4.8	21.5	79.8	25.4	0.3	0.7	2.5	0.1	22.9
Sepedi	0	0.2	9.5	0	10.5	0	52.7	4.0	0	9.2
Sesotho	2.2	62.1	13.1	0.5	3.2	0.9	1.1	5.1	0.4	7.7
SiSwati	0	0.1	1.3	0.1	30.0	0	1.2	0.5	0	2.5
Setswana	0	6.5	7.9	0	2.7	19.9	1.4	67.2	0.1	8.2
Tshivenda	0	0.1	1.4	0	0.1	0	15.5	0.4	0	2.2
Xitsonga	0	0.5	5.3	0	3.5	0	22.6	4.7	0	4.4
Other	0.2	0.3	1.3	0.5	0.4	0.8	0.3	0.5	0.6	0.6
Total	100	100	100	100	100	100	100	100	100	100

=== Employment ===
Economically active population by province amongst those aged 15 – 65 years
First language	Eastern Cape	Free State	Gauteng	KwaZulu-Natal	Mpumalanga	Northern Cape	Northern Province	North West	Western Cape	South Africa
Employed	786 818	701 175	2 564 243	1 570 573	605 925	215 523	570 129	725 287	1 374 174	9 113 847
Unemployed	742 427	299 948	1 007 766	1 008 944	297 290	86 060	486 554	443 546	299 114	4 671 647
Total	1 529 244	1 001 122	3 572 009	2 579 517	903 215	301 583	1 056 683	1 168 833	1 673 288	13 785 493
Unemployed as percentage of total	48%	29%	28%	39%	32%	28%	46%	37%	17%	33%

Labour market status of the population aged 15–65 years by population group – October 1996 View source data.

== See also ==
- South African National Census of 2001
- Demographics of South Africa
