= Francina Susanna Louw =

South African missionary and linguist (1872–1935)

Francina Susanna Louw née Malan, known as Cinie Louw (10 March 1872 – 25 June 1935) was a South African missionary and linguist working in South Rhodesia. The linguist Clement Martyn Doke praised her Manual of the Chirakanga Language (1915) as "the best grammatical sketch of any Mashonaland language hitherto published".

== Biography ==
Francina Susanna Malan was born in 1872, the child of a prominent Cape Province family. Her younger brother Daniël later became Prime Minister of South Africa, and at school in Riebeek West she was a classmate of Jan Smuts. After school she trained as a teacher and took miscellaneous jobs. On 25 April 1894 she married Andrew Louw at Paarl. The pair travelled to the Morgenster Mission near Fort Victoria, Rhodesia (today the city of Masvingo). There they both learned the Karanga dialect of Shona, and Louw became a fluent speaker.

Louw edited a Karangaa-language church magagazine, Munyai waShe (The King's Messenger), and translated 210 hymns into Karangaa. Her Manual of the Chikaranga Language was intended for missionaries and colonial officials. It contained a grammatical description, a vocabulary list of 8,000 words, and exercises with conversational sentences. Together with her husband, she also translated the New Testament into Karangaa.

Louw became a member of the Mission Council's Language Commission, and later of the Language Commission of the Southern Rhodesian government.

In 1943 a hospital was built in her memory, the Cinie Louw Memorial Hospital, in Morgenster, present-day Zimbabwe.

== Works ==
- (with J. T. Helm and A. A. Louw) Dzemǵe buko dze Testamente Tsüa dza ka shandorigoa ne tshiKaranga [Books of the New Testament tranaled into chiShona]. London : British and Foreign Bible Society, 1904 [i.e. 1906]
- A manual of the Chikaranga language, with grammar, exercises, useful conversational sentences and vocabulary: English-Chikaranga and Chikaranga-English. Bulawayo: Philpott & Collins, 1915.
- Ev̲angeri ya Mateo [The Gospel of Matthew]. London : British and Foreign Bible Society, 1916.
- (with J. T. Helm and A. A. Louw) Ev̲angeri ya Luka [The Gospel of Luke]. London: British and Foreign Bible Society, 1917.
- Ev̲angeri nna ne Mibato [The Gospels and Acts]. London: British and Foreign Bible Society, 1918.
- (with J. T. Helm and A. A. Louw) Testamente Ts̲a: ya she wedu no muchengeti Yesu Kristu [The New Testament]. London: British and Foreign Bible Society, 1919.
- (with A. A. Louw) Mapsalma a Davide [The Psalms of David]. Morgenster, South Rhodesia: Dutch Reformed Church Mission Press, 1921.
