= Vera Reitzer =

Hungarian Jewish Holocaust survivor

Vera Reitzer (born Schon; 1921–2006) was a Jewish Holocaust survivor, who later moved to South Africa and supported the apartheid regime. In 1950, she joined the governing National Party, which was implementing the first apartheid laws during the tenure of D.F. Malan.

Reitzer was born in Hungary and was sent to Auschwitz in 1944, with her mother (a niece of Sigmund Freud) and sister. After eight months they were sent to a factory in Germany, between Leipzig and Dresden, where they had to fill shells with gunpowder.

On 26 April 1945, they were rescued by American soldiers. Vera, fluent in five languages, acted as a translator between the Germans and Americans. In 1948 she moved to Israel, where she married Mirko Reitzer. They moved to South Africa in 1952. Her mother lived with her in Johannesburg until she died in 1995. Her sister Rosi died in Brazil in 2003. She was survived by two sons and six grandchildren.
