= Jan Smuts =

South African statesman and military officer (1870–1950)

Field Marshal The Right Honourable Jan Smuts OM CH DTD ED KC FRS
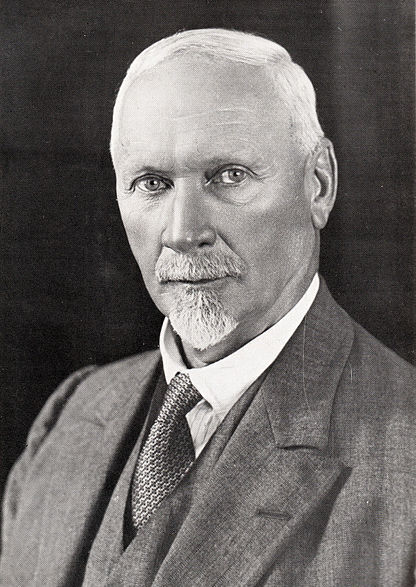
- Smuts in 1934

2nd Prime Minister of South Africa
- In office 5 September 1939 – 4 June 1948
- Monarch: George VI
- Governors-General: Sir Patrick Duncan; Nicolaas Jacobus de Wet; Gideon Brand van Zyl
- Preceded by: Barry Hertzog
- Succeeded by: Daniël Malan
- In office 3 September 1919 – 30 June 1924
- Monarch: George V
- Governors-General: The Viscount Buxton; Prince Arthur of Connaught; The Earl of Athlone
- Preceded by: Louis Botha
- Succeeded by: Barry Hertzog

Leader of the United Party
- In office 1934 – 11 September 1950
- Preceded by: Position established
- Succeeded by: Jacobus Strauss

Leader of the Opposition
- In office 4 June 1948 – 11 September 1950
- Monarch: George VI
- Prime Minister: Daniël Malan
- Preceded by: Daniël Malan
- Succeeded by: Jacobus Strauss

Member of the House of Assembly for Standerton
- In office 1924 – 7 July 1943
- Preceded by: G. M. Claassen
- Succeeded by: W. C. du Plessis

Personal details
- Born: Jan Christiaan (or Christian) Smuts; 24 May 1870 Bovenplaats, Cape Colony
- Died: 11 September 1950 (aged 80) Irene, Transvaal, Union of South Africa
- Party: Het Volk (1904–1910); South African Party (1910/1911–1934); United Party; (from 1934)
- Spouse: Isie Krige
- Children: 6
- Education: Victoria College, Stellenbosch; Christ's College, Cambridge
- Profession: Barrister
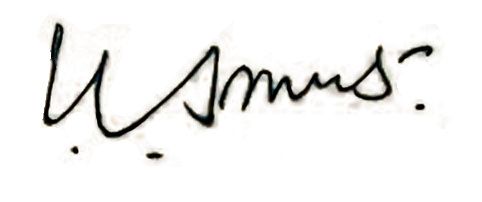
- Signature

Military service
- Allegiance: South African Republic; Union of South Africa; United Kingdom
- Rank: Field Marshal
- Commands: South African Defence Forces
- Battles/wars: Second Boer War; First World War

Field Marshal Jan Christian Smuts (Afrikaans: [jan smœts]; baptismal name Jan Christiaan Smuts; 24 May 1870 – 11 September 1950) was a South African statesman, military officer and philosopher. In addition to holding various military and cabinet posts, he served as Prime Minister of the Union of South Africa from 1919 to 1924 and 1939 to 1948.

Smuts was born to Afrikaner parents in the British Cape Colony. He was educated at Victoria College, Stellenbosch, before studying law at Christ's College, Cambridge, on a scholarship. He was called to the bar at the Middle Temple in 1894 but returned home the following year. In the leadup to the Second Boer War, Smuts practised law in Pretoria, the capital of the South African Republic. He led the republic's delegation to the Bloemfontein Conference and served as an officer in a commando unit following the outbreak of war in 1899. In 1902, he played a key role in negotiating the Treaty of Vereeniging, which ended the war and resulted in the annexation of the South African Republic and Orange Free State into the British Empire. He subsequently helped negotiate self-government for the Transvaal Colony, becoming a cabinet minister under Louis Botha.

Smuts played a leading role in the creation of the Union of South Africa in 1910, helping shape its constitution. He and Botha established the South African Party, with Botha becoming the union's first prime minister and Smuts holding multiple cabinet portfolios. As defence minister he was responsible for the Union Defence Force during the First World War. Smuts personally led troops in the East African campaign in 1916 and the following year joined the Imperial War Cabinet in London. He played a leading role at the Paris Peace Conference of 1919, advocating for the creation of the League of Nations and securing South African control over the former German South-West Africa.

In 1919, Smuts replaced Botha as prime minister, holding the office until the South African Party's defeat at the 1924 general election by J. B. M. Hertzog's National Party. He spent several years in academia, during which he coined the term "holism", before eventually re-entering politics as deputy prime minister in a coalition with Hertzog; in 1934 their parties subsequently merged to form the United Party. Smuts returned as prime minister in 1939, leading South Africa into the Second World War at the head of a pro-interventionist faction. He was appointed field marshal in 1941 and in 1945 signed the UN Charter, the only signer of the Treaty of Versailles to do so. His second term in office ended with the victory of his political opponents, the reconstituted National Party at the 1948 general election, with the new government implementing early apartheid policies.

Smuts was an internationalist who played a key role in establishing and defining the League of Nations, United Nations and Commonwealth of Nations. He supported racial segregation and opposed democratic non-racial rule. At the end of his career, Smuts supported the Fagan Commission's recommendations to relax restrictions on black South Africans living and working in urban areas.

== Early life and education ==
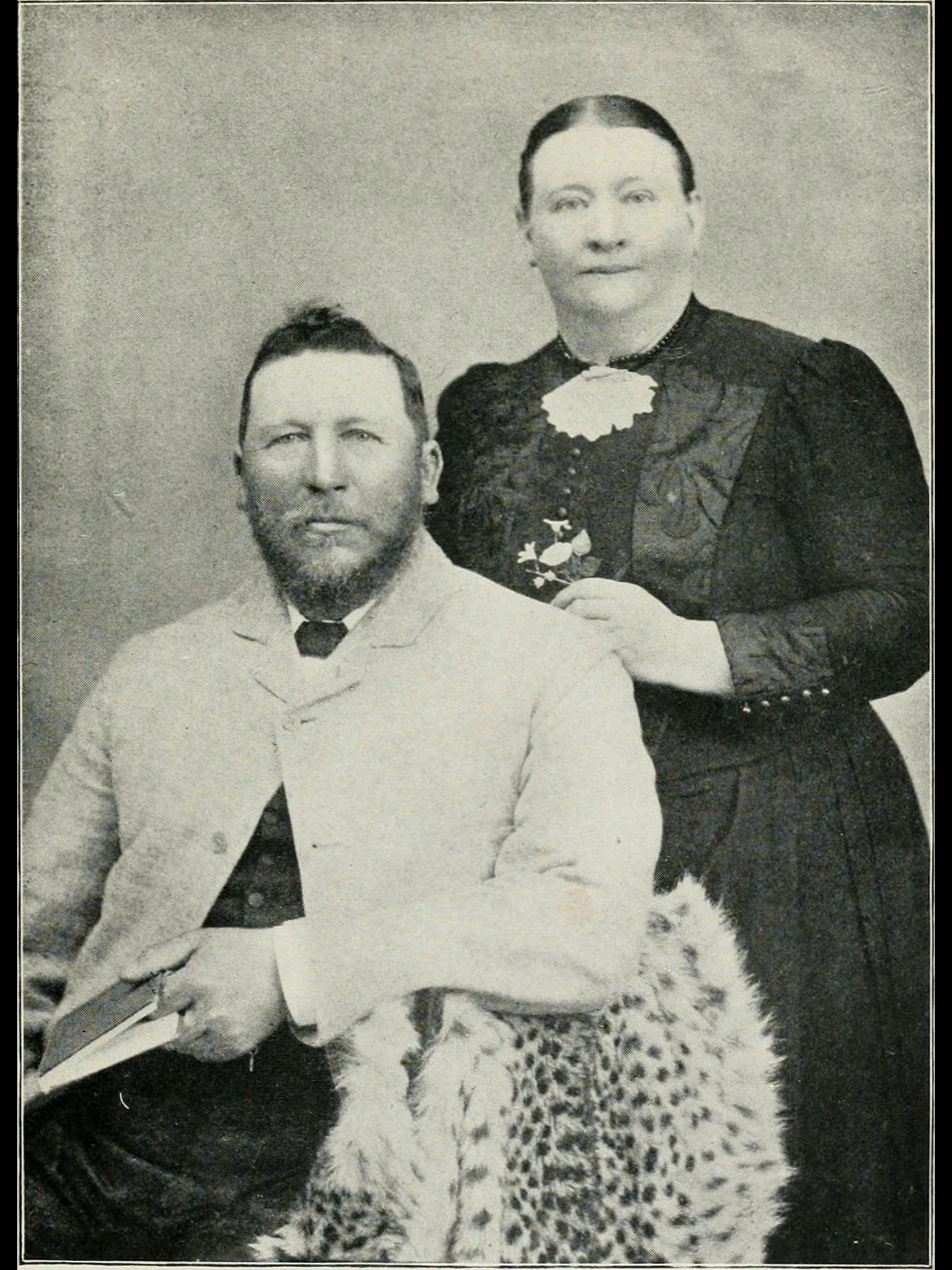
Jacobus and Catharina Smuts, 1893

Smuts was born on 24 May 1870, at the family farm, Bovenplaats, near Malmesbury, in the Cape Colony. His parents, Jacobus Smuts and his wife Catharina, were prosperous, traditional Afrikaner farmers, long established and highly respected. Their ancestry included a descent from the Khoi interpreter Krotoa.

As the second son of the family, rural custom dictated that Jan would remain working on the farm. In this system, typically only the first son was supported for a full, formal education. In 1882, when Jan was twelve, his elder brother died, and Jan was sent to school in his place. Jan attended the school in nearby Riebeek West. He made excellent progress despite his late start, and caught up with his contemporaries within four years. He was admitted to Victoria College, Stellenbosch, in 1886, at the age of sixteen.

At Stellenbosch, he learned High Dutch, German, and Ancient Greek, and immersed himself in literature, the classics, and Bible studies. His deeply traditional upbringing and serious outlook led to social isolation from his peers. He made outstanding academic progress, graduating in 1891 with double first-class honours in Literature and Science. During his last years at Stellenbosch, Smuts began to cast off some of his shyness and reserve. At this time he met Isie Krige, whom he later married.

On graduation from Victoria College, Smuts won the Ebden scholarship for overseas study. He decided to attend the University of Cambridge in the United Kingdom to read law at Christ's College. Smuts found it difficult to settle at Cambridge. He felt homesick and isolated by his age and different upbringing from the English undergraduates. Worries over money also contributed to his unhappiness, as his scholarship was insufficient to cover his university expenses. He confided these worries to Professor J. I. Marais, a friend from Victoria College. In reply, Professor Marais enclosed a cheque for a substantial sum, by way of loan, encouraging Smuts to let him know if he ever found himself in need again. Thanks to Marais, Smuts's financial standing was secure. He gradually began to enter more into the social aspects of the university, although he retained a single-minded dedication to his studies.

During this time in Cambridge, Smuts studied a diverse number of subjects in addition to law. He wrote a book, Walt Whitman: A Study in the Evolution of Personality. It was not published until 1973, after his death, but it can be seen that Smuts in this book had already conceptualized his thinking for his later wide-ranging philosophy of holism.

Smuts graduated in 1894 with a double first. Over the previous two years, he had received numerous academic prizes and accolades, including the coveted George Long prize in Roman Law and Jurisprudence. One of his tutors, Frederic William Maitland, a leading figure among English legal historians, described Smuts as the most brilliant student he had ever met. Alec Todd, the Master of Christ's College, said in 1970 that "in 500 years of the College's history, of all its members, past and present, three had been truly outstanding: John Milton, Charles Darwin and Jan Smuts."

In December 1894, Smuts passed the examinations for the Inns of Court, entering the Middle Temple. His old Cambridge college, Christ's College, offered him a fellowship in Law. Smuts turned his back on a potentially distinguished legal future. By June 1895, he had returned to the Cape Colony, determined to make his future there.

== Career ==
=== Law and politics ===
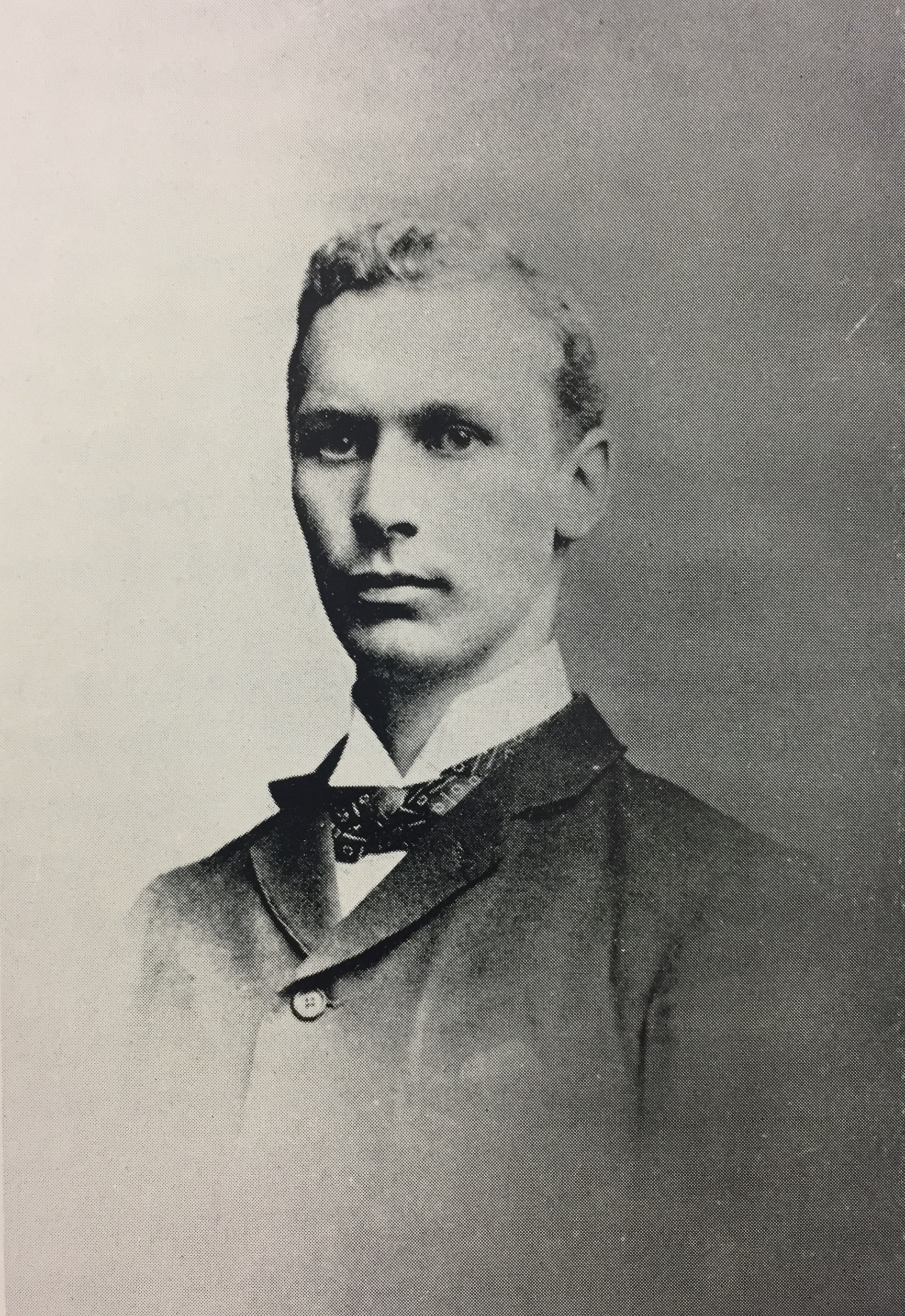
Jan Smuts, as a young state attorney general in 1895

Smuts began to practise law in Cape Town, but his abrasive nature made him few friends. Finding little financial success in the law, he began to devote more and more of his time to politics and journalism, writing for the Cape Times. Smuts was intrigued by the prospect of a united South Africa, and joined the Afrikaner Bond. By good fortune, Smuts's father knew the leader of the group, Jan Hofmeyr. Hofmeyr in turn recommended Jan to Cecil Rhodes, who owned the De Beers mining company. In 1895, Smuts became an advocate and supporter of Rhodes.

When Rhodes launched the Jameson Raid, in the summer of 1895–96, Smuts was outraged. Feeling betrayed by his employer, friend and political ally, he resigned from De Beers, and left political life. Instead he became state attorney in the capital of the South African Republic, Pretoria.

After the Jameson Raid, relations between the British and the Afrikaners had deteriorated steadily. By 1898, war seemed imminent. Orange Free State President Martinus Steyn called for a peace conference at Bloemfontein to settle each side's grievances. With an intimate knowledge of the British, Smuts took control of the Transvaal delegation. Sir Alfred Milner, head of the British delegation, took exception to his dominance, and conflict between the two led to the collapse of the conference, consigning South Africa to war.

=== Psychology ===
Smuts was the first South African to be internationally regarded as an important psychologist. During Smuts's undergraduate years at Cambridge University, he produced a manuscript in 1895 in which he analysed the personality of the famous American poet Walt Whitman. Due to his manuscript being considered unviable, it was only published 23 years after his death in 1973. Smuts went on to produce his next manuscript, which he completed in 1910, entitled An Inquiry into the Whole. His manuscript was then revised in 1924 and published in 1926 with the title Holism and Evolution.

Smuts had no interest in pursuing a career in psychology. He considered psychology as "too impersonal to study great personalities", and believed that the holistic tendency of the personality would be studied best through personology. Smuts, however, never inquired further into the idea of personology due to his wanting to continue laying the foundation of the concept of holism. He never returned to either of the topics.

Holism

Although the concept of holism has been discussed by many, the term holism in academic terminology was first introduced and publicly shared in print by Smuts in the early twentieth century. Smuts was acknowledged for his contribution by getting the honour to write the first entry about the concept for the Encyclopædia Britannica 1929 edition. The Austrian medical doctor, founder of the school of Individual Psychology, and psychotherapist, Alfred Adler (1870–1937), also showed a great interest in Smuts's book. Adler requested permission from Smuts to have the book translated to German and published in Germany.

Although Smuts's concept of holism is grounded in the natural sciences, he claimed that it has a relevance in philosophy, ethics, sociology, and psychology. In Holism and Evolution, he argued that the concept of holism is "grounded in evolution and is also an ideal that guides human development and one's level of personality actualization." Smuts stated in the book that "personality is the highest form of holism" (p. 292).

Recognition from Adler

Adler later wrote a letter, dated 31 January 1931, where he stated that he recommended Smuts's book to his students and followers. He referred to it as "the best preparation for the science of Individual Psychology". After Smuts gave permission for the translation and publication of his book in Germany, it was translated by H. Minkowski and eventually published in 1938. During the Second World War, the books were destroyed after the Nazi government had removed it from circulation. Adler and Smuts, however, continued their correspondence. In one of Adler's letters dated 14 June 1931, he invited Smuts to be one of three judges of the best book on the history of wholeness with a reference to Individual Psychology.

=== The Boer War ===
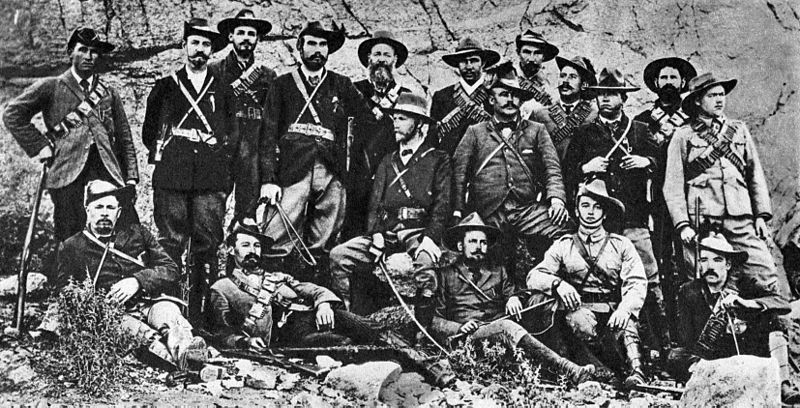
Jan Smuts and Boer guerrillas during the Second Boer War, c. 1901

On 11 October 1899 the Boer republics declared war and launched an offensive into the British-held Natal and Cape Colony areas, beginning the Second Boer War of 1899–1902. In the early stages of the conflict, Smuts served as Paul Kruger's eyes and ears in Pretoria, handling propaganda, logistics, communication with generals and diplomats, and anything else that was required. In the second phase of the war, from mid-1900, Smuts served under Koos de la Rey, who commanded 500 commandos in the Western Transvaal. Smuts excelled at hit-and-run warfare, and the unit evaded and harassed a British army forty times its size. President Paul Kruger and the deputation in Europe thought that there was good hope for their cause in the Cape Colony. They decided to send General de la Rey there to assume supreme command, but then decided to act more cautiously when they realised that General de la Rey could hardly be spared in the Western Transvaal. Consequently, Smuts was left with a small force of 300 men, while another 100 men followed him. By January 1902 the British scorched-earth policy left little grazing land. One hundred of the cavalry that had joined Smuts were therefore too weak to continue and so Smuts had to leave these men with General Pieter Hendrik Kritzinger. Intelligence indicated that at this time Smuts had about 3,000 men.

Smuts' forces penetrated the Cape Colony extent that some elements came within sight of Table Mountain. To draw out British forces, Smuts sought to take a major target, the copper-mining town of Okiep in the present-day Northern Cape Province (April–May 1902), which he laid under siege. Events in the Transvaal overtook the siege before it was resolved: in late April a dispatch from Lord Kitchener reached Smuts, inviting him to the peace conference at Veeringen. Smuts agreed a truce and with the garrison and departed to attend the peace negotiations. In his absence Boer officer Manie Maritz attempted to break the truce by attacking the town with a train packed full of explosives. This effort failed when the train derailed outside of the town and its deadly cargo burnt off harmlessly.

Before the conference, Smuts met Lord Kitchener at Kroonstad railway station, where they discussed the proposed terms of surrender. Smuts then took a leading role in the negotiations between the representatives from all of the commandos from the Orange Free State and the South African Republic (15–31 May 1902). Although he admitted that, from a purely military perspective, the war could continue, he stressed the importance of not sacrificing the Afrikaner people for that independence. He was very conscious that "more than 20,000 women and children have already died in the concentration camps of the enemy". He felt it would have been a crime to continue the war without the assurance of help from elsewhere and declared, "Comrades, we decided to stand to the bitter end. Let us now, like men, admit that that end has come for us, come in a more bitter shape than we ever thought." His opinions were representative of the conference, which then voted by 54 to 6 in favour of peace. Representatives of the Governments met Lord Kitchener and at five minutes past eleven on 31 May 1902, the Acting State President of the South African Republic, Schalk Willem Burger signed the Treaty of Vereeniging, followed by the members of his government, Acting State President of the Orange Free State, Christiaan De Wet, and the members of his government.

=== A British Transvaal ===
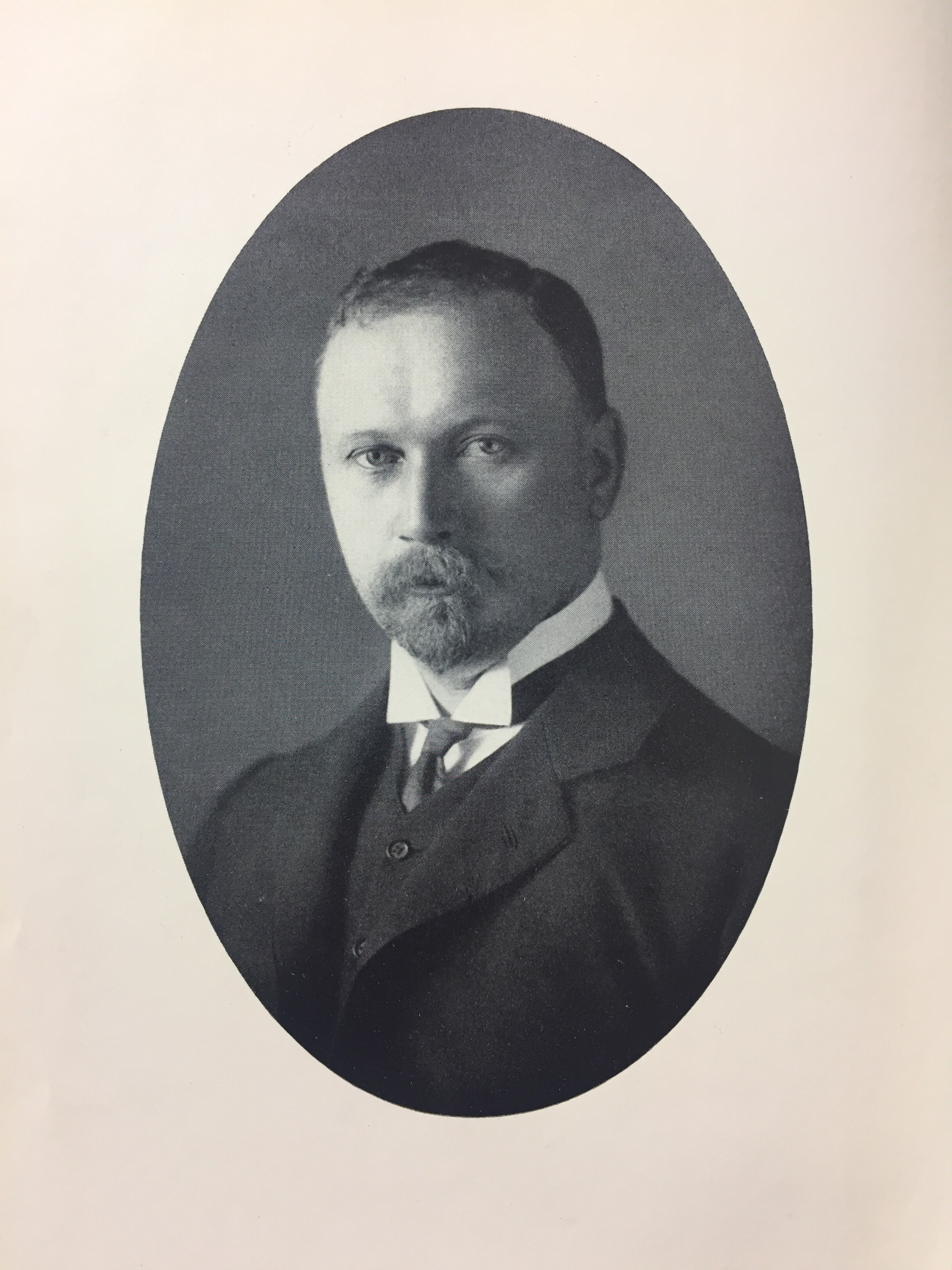
Jan Smuts around 1905

Despite Smuts's exploits as a general and a negotiator, nothing could mask the fact that the Boers had been defeated. Lord Milner had full control of all South African affairs, and established an Anglophone elite, known as Milner's Kindergarten. As an Afrikaner, Smuts was excluded. Defeated but not deterred, in May 1904, he decided to join with the other former Transvaal generals to form a political party, Het Volk ('The People'), to fight for the Afrikaner cause. Louis Botha was elected leader, and Smuts his deputy.

When his term of office expired, Milner was replaced as High Commissioner by the more conciliatory William Palmer, 2nd Earl of Selborne. Smuts saw an opportunity and pounced, urging Botha to persuade the Liberals to support Het Volk's cause. When the Conservative government under Arthur Balfour collapsed, in December 1905, the decision paid off. Smuts joined Botha in London, and sought to negotiate responsible government for the Transvaal within British South Africa. Using the thorny political issue of South Asian labourers ('coolies'), the South Africans convinced Prime Minister Sir Henry Campbell-Bannerman and, with him, the cabinet and Parliament.

Through 1906, Smuts worked on the new constitution for the Transvaal, and, in December 1906, elections were held for the Transvaal parliament. Despite being shy and reserved, unlike the showman Botha, Smuts won a comfortable victory in the Wonderboom constituency, near Pretoria. His victory was one of many, with Het Volk winning in a landslide and Botha forming the government. To reward his loyalty and efforts, Smuts was given two key cabinet positions: Colonial Secretary and Education Secretary.

Smuts proved to be an effective leader, if unpopular. As Education Secretary, he had fights with the Dutch Reformed Church, of which he had once been a dedicated member, which demanded Calvinist teachings in schools. As Colonial Secretary, he opposed a movement for equal rights for South Asian workers, led by Mohandas Karamchand Gandhi. During the years of Transvaal self-government, nobody could avoid the predominant political debate of the day: South African unification. Ever since the British victory in the war, it was an inevitability, but it remained up to the South Africans to decide what sort of country would be formed, and how it would be formed. Smuts favoured a unitary state, with power centralised in Pretoria, with English as the only official language, and with a more inclusive electorate. To impress upon his compatriots his vision, he called a constitutional convention in Durban, in October 1908.

Jan Smuts, c. 1914

There, Smuts was up against a hard-talking Orange River Colony delegation, who refused every one of Smuts's demands. Smuts had successfully predicted this opposition, and their objections, and tailored his own ambitions appropriately. He allowed compromise on the location of the capital, on the official language, and on suffrage, but he refused to budge on the fundamental structure of government. As the convention drew into autumn, the Orange leaders began to see a final compromise as necessary to secure the concessions that Smuts had already made. They agreed to Smuts's draft South African constitution, which was duly ratified by the South African colonies. Smuts and Botha took the constitution to London, where it was passed by Parliament and given Royal Assent by King Edward VII in December 1909.

=== The Old Boers ===
The Union of South Africa was born, and the Afrikaners held the key to political power, as the majority of the increasingly whites-only electorate. Although Botha was appointed prime minister of the new country, Smuts was given three key ministries: Interior, Mines, and Defence. Undeniably, Smuts was the second most powerful man in South Africa. To solidify their dominance of South African politics, the Afrikaners united to form the South African Party, a new pan-South African Afrikaner party.

The harmony and co-operation soon ended. Smuts was criticised for his overarching powers, and the cabinet was reshuffled. Smuts lost Interior and Mines, but gained control of Finance. That was still too much for Smuts's opponents, who decried his possession of both Defence and Finance, two departments that were usually at loggerheads. At the 1913 South African Party conference, the Old Boers (J. B. M. Hertzog, Martinus Theunis Steyn, Christiaan de Wet), called for Botha and Smuts to step down. The two narrowly survived a confidence vote, and the troublesome triumvirate stormed out, leaving the party for good.

With the schism in internal party politics came a new threat to the mines that brought South Africa its wealth. A small-scale miners' dispute flared into a full-blown strike, and rioting broke out in Johannesburg after Smuts intervened heavy-handedly. After police shot dead twenty-one strikers, Smuts and Botha headed unaccompanied to Johannesburg to resolve the situation personally. Facing down threats to their own lives, they negotiated a cease-fire. But the cease-fire did not hold, and in 1914, a railway strike turned into a general strike. Threats of a revolution caused Smuts to declare martial law. He acted ruthlessly, deporting union leaders without trial and using Parliament to absolve him and the government of any blame retroactively. That was too much for the Old Boers, who set up their own National Party to fight the all-powerful Botha-Smuts partnership.

=== First World War ===
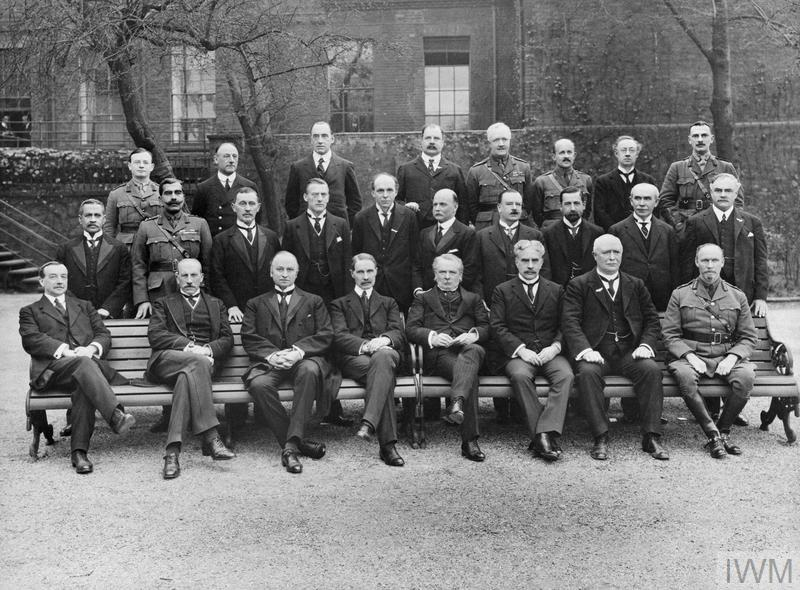
The Imperial War Cabinet (1917). Jan Smuts is seated on the right.

During the First World War, Smuts formed the Union Defence Force (UDF). His first task was to suppress the Maritz Rebellion, which was accomplished by November 1914. Next he and Louis Botha led the South African army into German South-West Africa and conquered it (see the South-West Africa Campaign for details). In 1916 General Smuts was put in charge of the conquest of German East Africa. Col (later BGen) J. H. V. Crowe commanded the artillery in East Africa under General Smuts and published an account of the campaign, General Smuts' Campaign in East Africa, in 1918. Smuts was promoted to temporary lieutenant general on 18 February 1916, and to honorary lieutenant general for distinguished service in the field on 1 January 1917.

Smuts's chief intelligence officer, Colonel Richard Meinertzhagen, wrote very critically of his conduct of the campaign. He believed Horace Smith-Dorrien (who had saved the British Army during the retreat from Mons and was the original choice as commander in 1916) would have quickly defeated the Germans. In particular, Meinertzhagen thought that frontal attacks would have been decisive, and less costly than the flanking movements preferred by Smuts, which took longer, so that thousands of Imperial troops died of disease in the field. He wrote: "Smuts has cost Britain many hundreds of lives and many millions of pounds by his caution ... Smuts was not an astute soldier; a brilliant statesman and politician but no soldier." Meinertzhagen wrote these comments in October/November 1916, in the weeks after being relieved by Smuts due to symptoms of depression, and he was invalided back to England shortly thereafter.

Early in 1917, Smuts left Africa and went to London, as he had been invited to join the Imperial War Cabinet and the War Policy Committee by David Lloyd George. Smuts initially recommended renewed Western Front attacks and a policy of attrition, lest with Russian commitment to the war wavering, France or Italy would be tempted to make a separate peace. Lloyd George wanted a commander "of the dashing type" for the Middle East in succession to Archibald Murray, but Smuts refused the command (late May) unless promised resources for a decisive victory, and he agreed with William Robertson that Western Front commitments did not justify a serious attempt to capture Jerusalem. Edmund Allenby was appointed instead. Like other members of the War Cabinet, Smuts's commitment to Western Front efforts was shaken by Third Ypres.

In 1917, following the German Gotha Raids, and lobbying by Viscount French, Smuts wrote a review of the British Air Services, which came to be called the Smuts Report. He was helped in large part in this by General Sir David Henderson who was seconded to him. This report led to the treatment of air as a separate force, which eventually became the Royal Air Force.

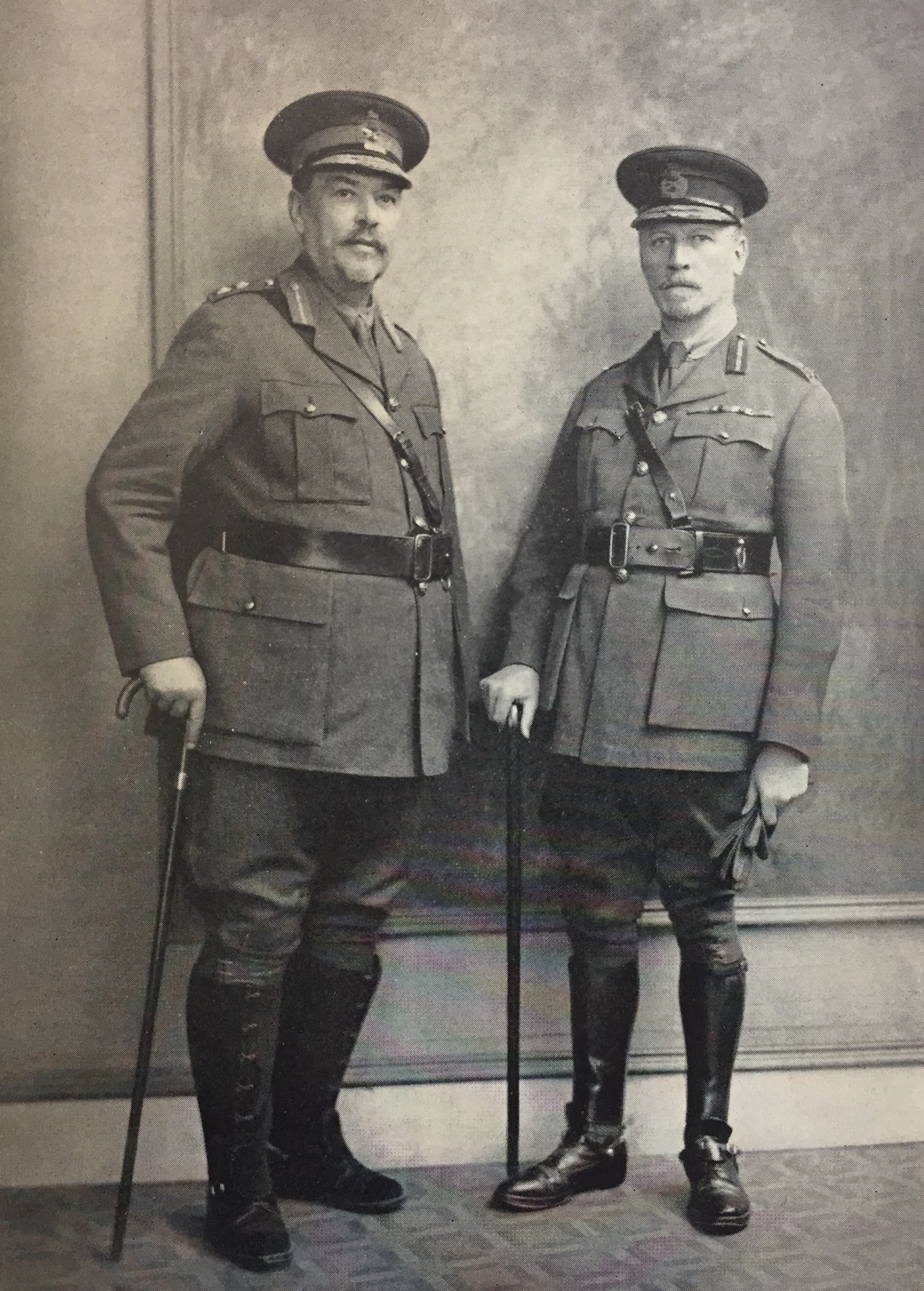
Generals Botha and Smuts at Versailles, July 1919

By mid-January 1918, Lloyd George was toying with the idea of appointing Smuts Commander-in-Chief of all land and sea forces facing the Ottoman Empire, reporting directly to the War Cabinet rather than to Robertson. Early in 1918, Smuts was sent to Egypt to confer with Allenby and William Marshall, and prepare for major efforts in that theatre. Before his departure, alienated by Robertson's exaggerated estimates of the required reinforcements, he urged Robertson's removal. Allenby told Smuts of Robertson's private instructions (sent by hand of Walter Kirke, appointed by Robertson as Smuts's adviser) that there was no merit in any further advance. He worked with Smuts to draw up plans, using three reinforcement divisions from Mesopotamia, to reach Haifa by June and Damascus by the autumn, the speed of the advance limited by the need to lay fresh rail track. This was the foundation of Allenby's successful offensive later in the year.

Like most British Empire political and military leaders in the First World War, Smuts thought the American Expeditionary Forces lacked the proper leadership and experience to be effective quickly. He supported the Anglo-French amalgamation policy towards the Americans. In particular, he had a low opinion of General John J. Pershing's leadership skills, so much so that he proposed to Lloyd George that Pershing be relieved of command and US forces be placed "under someone more confident, like [himself]". This did not endear him to the Americans once it was leaked.

=== Statesman ===
Smuts and Botha were key negotiators at the Paris Peace Conference. Both were in favour of reconciliation with Germany and limited reparations. Smuts was a key architect of the League of Nations through his correspondences with Woodrow Wilson, his work with the Imperial War Cabinet during the First World War and his book League of Nations: A Practical Suggestion. According to Jacob Kripp, Smuts saw the League as necessary in unifying white internationalists and pacifying a race war through indirect rule by Europeans over non-whites and segregation. Kripp states that the League of Nations mandates system reflected a compromise between Smuts's desire to annex non-white territories and Woodrow Wilson's principles of trusteeship.

He was sent to Budapest to negotiate with Béla Kun's Hungarian Soviet Republic. This was in the wake of issues around the neutral zone the Entente dictated in the Vix Note. Smuts arrived on 4 April 1919, and negotiations started the next day. He offered a neutral zone more favorable to Hungary (shifted 25 km east), though making sure its western border passed west of the final border proposal worked out in the Commission on Romanian and Yugoslav Affairs, that the Hungarian leaders were unaware of. Smuts reassured the Hungarians that the agreement would not influence Hungary's final borders. He also teased the lifting of the economic blockade of the country and inviting the Hungarian soviet leaders to the Paris Peace Conference. Kun rejected the terms, and demanded the return to the Belgrade armistice line later that day, upon which Smuts ended negotiations and left. On 8 April he negotiated with Tomáš Masaryk in Prague over the Hungarian border. Hungary's rejection led to the conference's approval of a Czechoslovak-Romanian invasion and harsher terms in the Treaty of Trianon.

The Treaty of Versailles gave South Africa a Class C mandate over German South-West Africa (which later became Namibia), which was occupied from 1919 until withdrawal in 1990. At the same time, Australia was given a similar mandate over German New Guinea, which it held until 1975. Both Smuts and the Australian prime minister Billy Hughes feared the rising power of the Empire of Japan in the post-First World War world. When the former German East Africa was divided into two mandated territories (Ruanda-Urundi and Tanganyika), Smutsland was one of the proposed names for what became Tanganyika. Smuts, who had called for South African territorial expansion all the way to the River Zambesi since the late 19th century, was ultimately disappointed with the League awarding South-West Africa only a mandate status, as he had looked forward to formally incorporating the territory to South Africa.

Smuts returned to South African politics after the conference. When Botha died in 1919, Smuts was elected prime minister, serving until a shocking defeat in 1924 at the hands of the National Party. After the death of the former American President Woodrow Wilson, Smuts was quoted as saying that: "Not Wilson, but humanity failed at Paris."

While in Britain for an Imperial Conference in June 1921, Smuts went to Ireland and met Éamon de Valera to help broker an armistice and peace deal between the warring British and Irish nationalists. Smuts attempted to sell the concept of Ireland receiving Dominion status similar to that of Australia and South Africa.

During his first premiership Smuts was involved in a number of controversies. The first was the Rand Revolt of March 1922, where aeroplanes were used to bomb white miners who were striking in opposition to proposals to allow non-whites to do more skilled and semi-skilled work previously reserved to whites only. Smuts was accused of siding with the Rand Lords who wanted the removal of the colour bar in the hope that it would lower wage costs. The white miners perpetrated acts of violence across the Rand, including murderous attacks on non-Europeans, conspicuously on African miners in their compounds, and this culminated in a general assault on the police. Smuts declared martial law and suppressed the insurrection in three days – at a cost of 291 police and army deaths, and 396 civilians killed. A Martial Law Commission was established which found that Smuts used larger forces than were strictly required, but had saved lives by doing so.

The second was the Bulhoek Massacre of 24 May 1921, when at Bulhoek in the eastern Cape eight hundred South African policemen and soldiers armed with maxim machine guns and two field artillery guns killed 163 and wounded 129 members of an indigenous religious sect known as "Israelites" who had been armed with knobkerries, assegais and swords and who had refused to vacate land they regarded as holy to them. Casualties on the government side at Bulhoek amounted to one trooper wounded and one horse killed. Once again, there were charges of the unnecessary use of overwhelming force. However, no commission of enquiry was appointed.

The third was the Bondelswarts Rebellion, in which Smuts supported the actions of the South African administration in attacking the Bondelswarts in South West Africa. The mandatory administration moved to crush what they called a rebellion of 500 to 600 people, of which 200 were said to be armed (although only about 40 weapons were captured after the Bondelswarts were crushed). Gysbert Hofmeyr, the Mandatory Administrator, organised 400 armed men, and sent in aircraft to bomb the Bondelswarts. Casualties included 100 Bondelswart deaths, including a few women and children. A further 468 men were either wounded or taken prisoner. South Africa's international reputation was tarnished. Ruth First, a South African anti-apartheid activist and scholar, describes the Bondelswarts shooting as "the Sharpeville of the 1920s".

As a botanist, Smuts collected plants extensively over southern Africa. He went on several botanical expeditions in the 1920s and 1930s with John Hutchinson, former botanist-in-charge of the African section of the Herbarium of the Royal Botanic Gardens and taxonomist of note. Smuts was a keen mountaineer and supporter of mountaineering. One of his favourite rambles was up Table Mountain along a route now known as Smuts' Track. In February 1923 he unveiled a memorial to members of the Mountain Club who had been killed in the First World War.

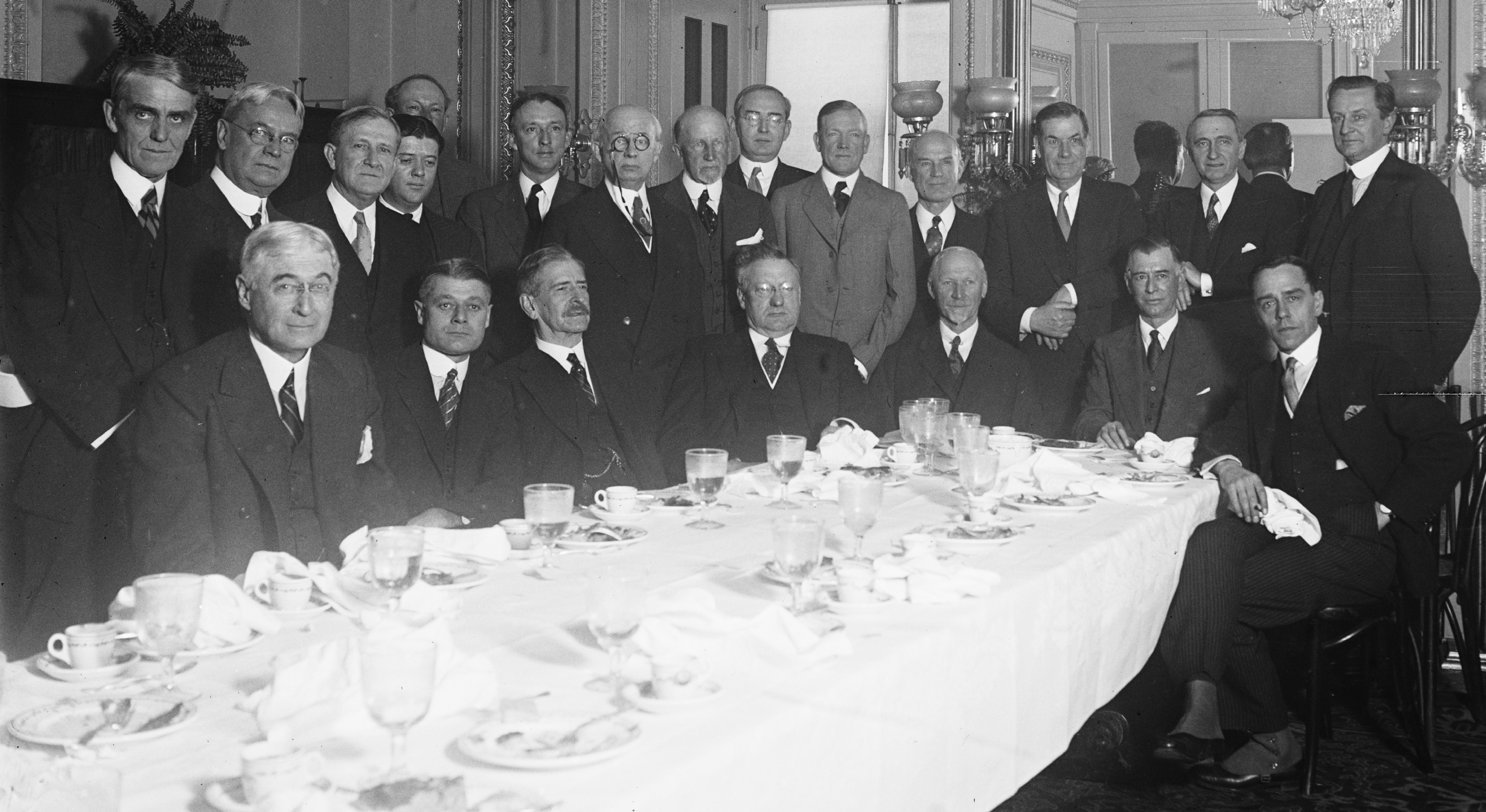
Jan Smuts attending a luncheon held by the US Senate Foreign Relations Committee in 1930

In 1925, assessing Smuts's role in international affairs, African-American historian and Pan-Africanist W. E. B. Du Bois wrote in an article which would be incorporated into the pivotal Harlem Renaissance text The New Negro,

Jan Smuts is today, in his world aspects, the greatest protagonist of the white race. He is fighting to take control of Laurenço Marques from a nation that recognizes, even though it does not realize, the equality of black folk; he is fighting to keep India from political and social equality in the empire; he is fighting to insure the continued and eternal subordination of black to white in Africa; and he is fighting for peace and good will in a white Europe which can by union present a united front to the yellow, brown and black worlds. In all this he expresses bluntly, and yet not without finesse, what a powerful host of white folk believe but do not plainly say in Melbourne, New Orleans, San Francisco, Hongkong, Berlin, and London.

In December 1934, Smuts told an audience at the Royal Institute of International Affairs that:

How can the inferiority complex which is obsessing and, I fear, poisoning the mind, and indeed the very soul of Germany, be removed? There is only one way and that is to recognise her complete equality of status with her fellows and to do so frankly, freely and unreservedly ... While one understands and sympathises with French fears, one cannot, but feel for Germany in the prison of inferiority in which she still remains sixteen years after the conclusion of the war. The continuance of the Versailles status is becoming an offence to the conscience of Europe and a danger to future peace ... Fair play, sportsmanship—indeed every standard of private and public life—calls for frank revision of the situation. Indeed ordinary prudence makes it imperative. Let us break these bonds and set the complexed-obsessed soul free in a decent human way and Europe will reap a rich reward in tranquility, security and returning prosperity.

Though in his Rectorial Address delivered on 17 October 1934 at St Andrews University he stated that:

The new Tyranny, disguised in attractive patriotic colours, is enticing youth everywhere into its service. Freedom must make a great counterstroke to save itself and our fair western civilisation. Once more the heroic call is coming to our youth. The fight for human freedom is indeed the supreme issue of the future, as it has always been.

=== Second World War ===
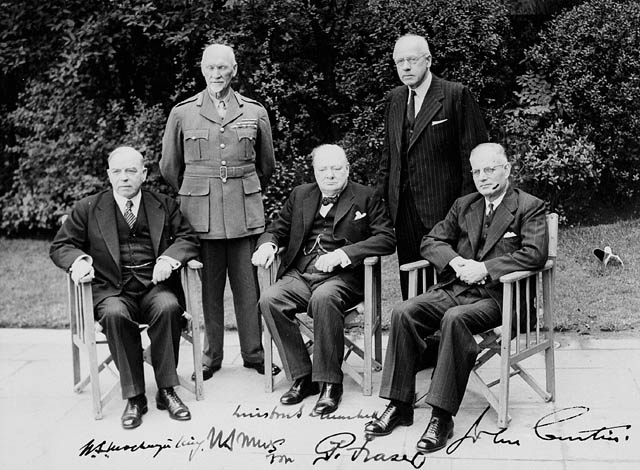
Field Marshal Smuts, standing left, at the 1944 Commonwealth Prime Ministers' Conference

After nine years in opposition and academia, Smuts returned as deputy prime minister in a 'grand coalition' government under J. B. M. Hertzog. When Hertzog advocated neutrality towards Nazi Germany in 1939, the coalition split and Hertzog's motion to remain out of the war was defeated in Parliament by a vote of 80 to 67. Governor-General Sir Patrick Duncan refused Hertzog's request to dissolve parliament for a general election on the issue. Hertzog resigned and Duncan invited Smuts, Hertzog's coalition partner, to form a government and become prime minister for the second time in order to lead the country into the Second World War on the side of the Allies.

On 24 May 1941, Smuts was appointed a field marshal of the British Army.

Smuts's importance to the Imperial war effort was emphasised by a quite audacious plan, proposed as early as 1940, to appoint Smuts as Prime Minister of the United Kingdom, should Churchill die or otherwise become incapacitated during the war. This idea was put forward by Jock Colville, Churchill's private secretary, to Queen Mary and then to George VI, both of whom warmed to the idea.

In May 1945, he represented South Africa in San Francisco at the drafting of the United Nations Charter. According to historian Mark Mazower, Smuts "did more than anyone to argue for, and help draft, the UN's stirring preamble." Smuts saw the UN as key to protecting white imperial rule over Africa. Also in 1945, he was mentioned by Halvdan Koht among seven candidates that were qualified for the Nobel Prize in Peace. However, he did not explicitly nominate any of them. The person actually nominated was Cordell Hull.

== Later life ==
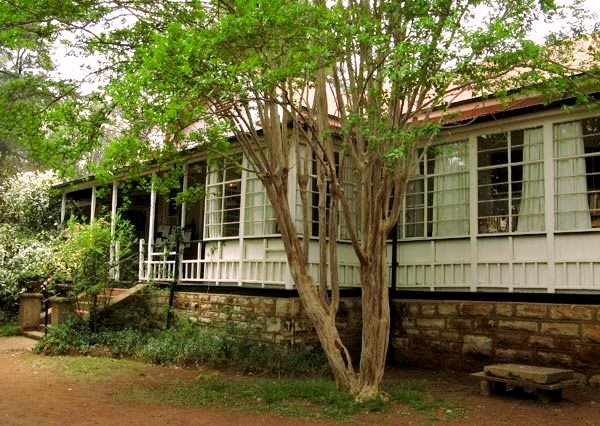
Smuts House, Irene, Pretoria

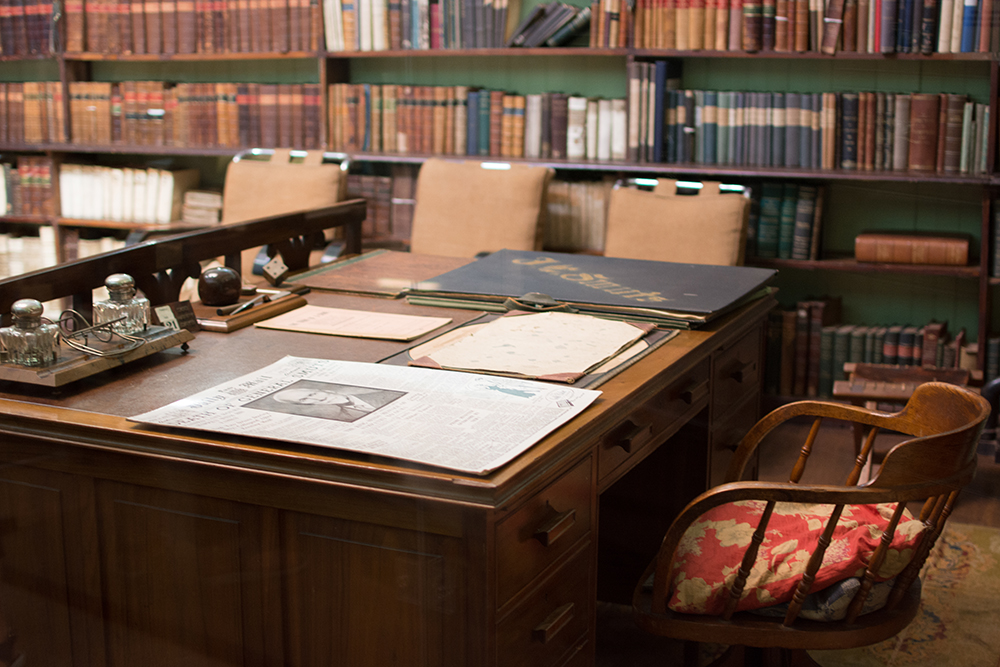
Jan Smuts Museum library

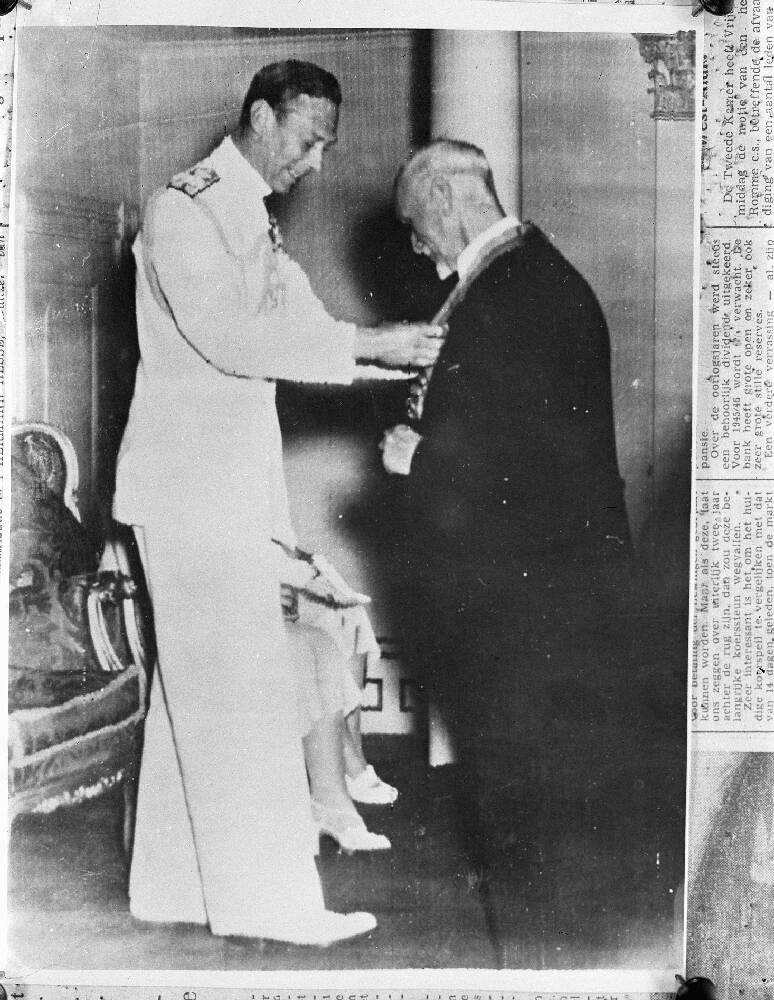
Smuts, presented with the Order of Merit by George VI

In domestic policy, a number of social security reforms were carried out during Smuts's second period in office as prime minister. Old-age pensions and disability grants were extended to 'Indians' and 'Africans' in 1944 and 1947 respectively, although there were differences in the level of grants paid out based on race. The Workmen's Compensation Act of 1941 "insured all employees irrespective of payment of the levy by employers and increased the number of diseases covered by the law," and the Unemployment Insurance Act of 1946 introduced unemployment insurance on a national scale, albeit with exclusions.

Smuts continued to represent his country abroad. He was a leading guest at the 1947 wedding of Princess Elizabeth and Philip, Duke of Edinburgh. At home, his preoccupation with the war had severe political repercussions in South Africa. Smuts's support of the war and his support for the Fagan Commission made him unpopular amongst the Afrikaner community and Daniel François Malan's pro-apartheid stance won the Reunited National Party the 1948 general election.

In 1948, he was elected Chancellor of the University of Cambridge, becoming the first person from outside the United Kingdom to hold that position. He held the position until his death two years later.

He accepted the appointment as Colonel-in-Chief of Regiment Westelike Provinsie as from 17 September 1948.

In 1949, Smuts was bitterly opposed to the London Declaration which transformed the British Commonwealth into the Commonwealth of Nations and made it possible for republics (such as the newly independent India) to remain its members. In the South African context, republicanism was mainly identified with Afrikaner Conservatism and with tighter racial segregation.

== Death ==
On 29 May 1950, a week after the public celebration of his eightieth birthday in Johannesburg and Pretoria, Field Marshal Jan Smuts suffered a coronary thrombosis. He died of a subsequent heart attack on his family farm of Doornkloof, Irene, near Pretoria, on 11 September 1950.

== Relations with Churchill ==
In 1899, Smuts interrogated the young Winston Churchill, who had been captured by Afrikaners during the Boer War, which was the first time they met. The next time was in 1906, while Smuts was leading a mission about South Africa's future to London before Churchill, then Under-Secretary of State for the Colonies. The British Cabinet shared Churchill's sympathetic view, which led to responsible government within the year, followed by dominion status for the Union of South Africa in 1910. Their association continued in the First World War, when Lloyd George appointed Smuts, in 1917, to the war cabinet in which Churchill served as Minister of Munitions. By then, both had formed a fast friendship that continued through Churchill's "wilderness years" and the Second World War, to Smuts's death. Charles Wilson, 1st Baron Moran, Churchill's personal physician, wrote in his diary:

Smuts is the only man who has any influence with the PM; indeed, he is the only ally I have in pressing counsels of common sense on the PM. Smuts sees so clearly that Winston is irreplaceable, that he may make an effort to persuade him to be sensible.

Churchill:

Smuts and I are like two old love-birds moulting together on a perch, but still able to peck.

When Anthony Eden said at a meeting of the Chiefs of Staff (29 October 1942) that Bernard Montgomery's Middle East offensive was "petering out", after having some late night drinks with Churchill the previous night, Alan Brooke had told Churchill "fairly plainly" what he thought of Eden's ability to judge the tactical situation from a distance (Churchill was always impatient for his generals to attack at once). He was supported at the Chiefs of Staff meeting by Smuts. Brooke said he was fortunate to be supported by:

a flow of words from the mouth of that wonderful statesman. It was as if oil had been poured on the troubled waters. The temperamental film-stars returned to their tasks – peace reigned in the dove cot!

== Views ==
=== Race and segregation ===
Smuts and his parties supported existing policies of racial discrimination in South Africa, taking a more moderate and ambiguous stance than the rival National Party, and he later endorsed the relatively liberal proposals of the Fagan Commission.

At the 1926 Imperial Conference Smuts stated:

If there was to be equal manhood suffrage over the Union, the whites would be swamped by the blacks. A distinction could not be made between Indians and Africans. They would be impelled by the inevitable force of logic to go the whole hog, and the result would be that not only would the whites be swamped in Natal by the Indians but the whites would be swamped all over South Africa by the blacks and the whole position for which the whites had striven for two hundred years or more now would be given up. So far as South Africa was concerned, therefore, it was a question of impossibility. For white South Africa it was not a question of dignity but a question of existence.

Smuts was, for most of his political life, a vocal supporter of segregation of the races, and in 1929 he justified the erection of separate institutions for black and white people in tones prescient of the later practice of apartheid:

The old practice mixed up black with white in the same institutions, and nothing else was possible after the native institutions and traditions had been carelessly or deliberately destroyed. But in the new plan there will be what is called in South Africa "segregation"; two separate institutions for the two elements of the population living in their own separate areas. Separate institutions involve territorial segregation of the white and black. If they live mixed together it is not practicable to sort them out under separate institutions of their own. Institutional segregation carries with it territorial segregation.

In general, Smuts's view of black Africans was patronising: he saw them as immature human beings who needed the guidance of whites, an attitude that reflected the common perceptions of most westerners in his lifetime. Of black Africans he stated that:

These children of nature have not the inner toughness and persistence of the European, not those social and moral incentives to progress which have built up European civilization in a comparatively short period.

Although Gandhi and Smuts were adversaries in many ways, they had a mutual respect and even admiration for each other. Before Gandhi returned to India in 1914, he presented General Smuts with a pair of sandals (now held by Ditsong National Museum of Cultural History) made by Gandhi himself. In 1939, Smuts, then prime minister, wrote an essay for a commemorative work compiled for Gandhi's 70th birthday and returned the sandals with the following message: "I have worn these sandals for many a summer, even though I may feel that I am not worthy to stand in the shoes of so great a man."

Smuts is often accused of being a politician who extolled the virtues of humanitarianism and liberalism abroad while failing to practise what he preached at home in South Africa. This was most clearly illustrated when India, in 1946, made a formal complaint in the UN concerning the legalised racial discrimination against Indians in South Africa. Appearing personally before the United Nations General Assembly, Smuts defended the policies of his government by fervently pleading that India's complaint was a matter of domestic jurisdiction. However, the General Assembly censured South Africa for its racial policies and called upon the Smuts government to bring its treatment of the South African Indians in conformity with the basic principles of the United Nations Charter.

At the same conference, the African National Congress President General Alfred Bitini Xuma along with delegates of the South African Indian Congress brought up the issue of the brutality of Smuts's police regime against the African Mine Workers' Strike earlier that year as well as the wider struggle for equality in South Africa.

In 1948, he went further away from his previous views on segregation when supporting the recommendations of the Fagan Commission that Africans should be recognised as permanent residents of White South Africa, and not merely as temporary workers who belonged in the reserves. This was in direct opposition to the policies of the National Party that wished to extend segregation and formalise it into apartheid. There is, however, no evidence that Smuts ever supported the idea of equal political rights for black and white people. Despite this, he did say:

The idea that the Natives must all be removed and confined in their own kraals is in my opinion the greatest nonsense I have ever heard.

The Fagan Commission did not advocate the establishment of a non-racial democracy in South Africa, but rather wanted to liberalise influx controls of black people into urban areas in order to facilitate the supply of black African labour to the South African industry. It also envisaged a relaxation of the pass laws that had restricted the movement of black South Africans in general.

Smuts did not believe in racial equality however. During a speech he delivered in the House of Assembly on 21 September 1948, Smuts outlined his own party's policy in regards to race as such:

Our policy has been European paramountcy in this country. Our policy has not been equal rights. We have never had any truck with equal rights. It is an abstraction forced upon us by our opponents. We stand and have always stood for European supremacy in this country. We have said that we have a position of guardianship, of trusteeship, over the non-European peoples in the country, and we must carry out that trust in the true spirit of exploitation but in a way which will justify our claim to be guardians of these people. We have never been in favour of equal rights. We have always stood and we stand for social and residential separation in this country, and for the avoidance of all racial mixture.

During the discussion, Smuts also spoke of making the reserves "attractive and keep the Native people who are there and should be there within their own areas," while also seeing "that they are politically developed, and that they can have a position of managing their own affairs in these areas." When one parliamentarian said to Smuts that he was "coming nearer and nearer to Apartheid," Smuts replied

I do not see why the Government party should claim this, it has always been our policy. With regard to the majority of the native people who live in the European areas, they are economically necessary to those areas. They have lived there, they have the right to be there. Every day they work there and they are economically integrated with these areas. We cannot move them away. All we can do is to improve their lots, to prevent these eyesores, these abhorrent conditions which are now arising in the industrial areas in South Africa. Therefore, our party on this side of the House have advocated Native villages, satellite villages or towns in those areas, which will provide proper housing, proper health, proper education and other facilities in those villages alongside and parallel to the White townships. That is what we have stood for. I do not believe members on the other side of the House have a definite policy.

Earlier in the discussion however, Smuts did criticise the government taking away (as he put it) the "very small rights" which non-Europeans had, arguing

I want to pin down this House and concentrate the public attention of this country on this issue – that what is contemplated, what is involved now, is not merely the abstract catchword of apartheid, but what is involved is fundamental change in the constitution of this country, a thing which we have never done before and which we did not contemplate doing in the future. Apart from this very grave issue that arises on our constitution I would ask, as a matter of policy, is it wise, is it right for us to take away these very small rights which the non-Europeans have in this country? Their political rights are so limited, there is so little to it, that I should have thought it would be simple elementary political wisdom to leave the matter alone. Here you have three European representatives of the Natives in a House of 153 members. What is the menace, what is the danger? It seems to me that it is simply playing with enormous issues. Here you have millions of people entrusted to our care. They cannot speak for themselves, that is the little voice they have, that is all they have. We gaily and unconcernedly step over them, we almost stamp on them, and we walk across them and take away these small rights, or propose to take away these small rights that have been given to them. How can we face our own public opinion in this country? How can we face the public opinion of the world? How can we face the future of South Africa when we behave in this way to people that have been put in our charge as a sacred trust? How can we defend ourselves? How can we with a clean conscience go forward to the future in such a way? I would therefore ask the House, and the people of this country, to be most careful. These people possess very small rights at present, and there is no question of their being extended in the immediate future. They may be extended according to the wisdom and the insight of those who follow us, but at present there is no such intention at all. The only matter we are faced with is the taking away of these few rights that they have. I think it is the height of folly.

In the assessment of South African Cambridge professor Saul Dubow, "Smuts's views of freedom were always geared to securing the values of western Christian civilization. He was consistent, albeit more flexible than his political contemporaries, in his espousal of white supremacy."

=== Holism and related academic work ===
While in academia, Smuts pioneered the concept of holism, which he defined as "[the] fundamental factor operative towards the creation of wholes in the universe" in his 1926 book, Holism and Evolution. Smuts's formulation of holism has been linked with his political-military activity, especially his aspiration to create a league of nations. As one biographer said:

It had very much in common with his philosophy of life as subsequently developed and embodied in his Holism and Evolution. Small units must develop into bigger wholes, and they in their turn again must grow into larger and ever-larger structures without cessation. Advancement lay along that path. Thus the unification of the four provinces in the Union of South Africa, the idea of the British Commonwealth of Nations, and, finally, the great whole resulting from the combination of the peoples of the earth in a great league of nations were but a logical progression consistent with his philosophical tenets.

=== Zionism ===
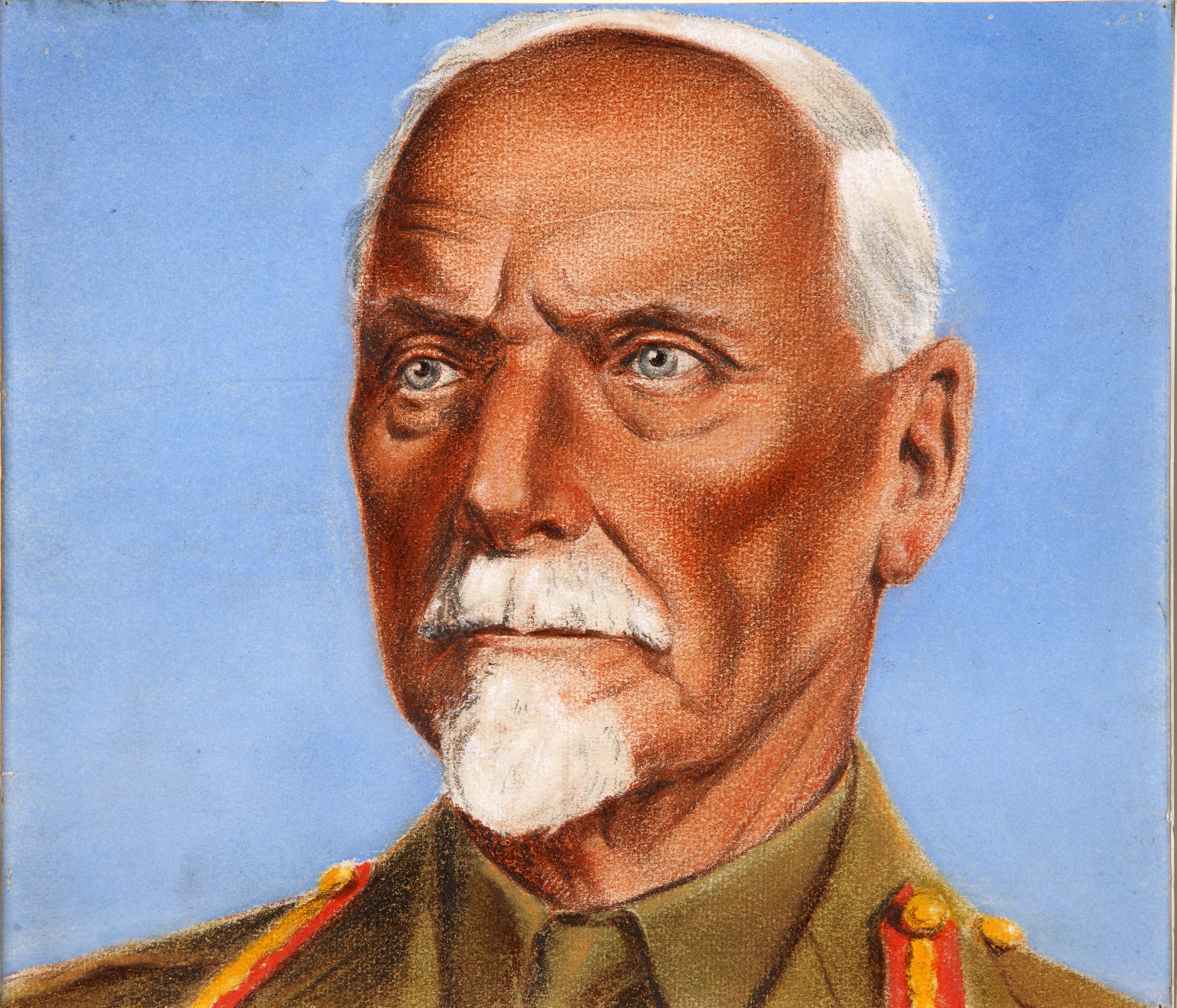
A 1944 painting of Smuts by William Timym in the Imperial War Museum

In 1943 Chaim Weizmann wrote to Smuts, detailing a plan to develop Britain's African colonies to compete with the United States. During his service as premier, Smuts personally fundraised for multiple Zionist organisations. His government granted de facto recognition to Israel on 24 May 1948. However, Smuts was deputy prime minister when the Hertzog government in 1937 passed the Aliens Act that was aimed at preventing Jewish immigration to South Africa. The act was seen as a response to growing anti-Semitic sentiments among Afrikaners.

Smuts lobbied against the White Paper of 1939, and several streets and a kibbutz, Ramat Yohanan, in Israel are named after him. He also wrote an epitaph for Weizmann, describing him as "the greatest Jew since Moses." Smuts once said:

Great as are the changes wrought by this war, the great world war of justice and freedom, I doubt whether any of these changes surpass in interest the liberation of Palestine and its recognition as the Home of Israel.

== Legacy ==
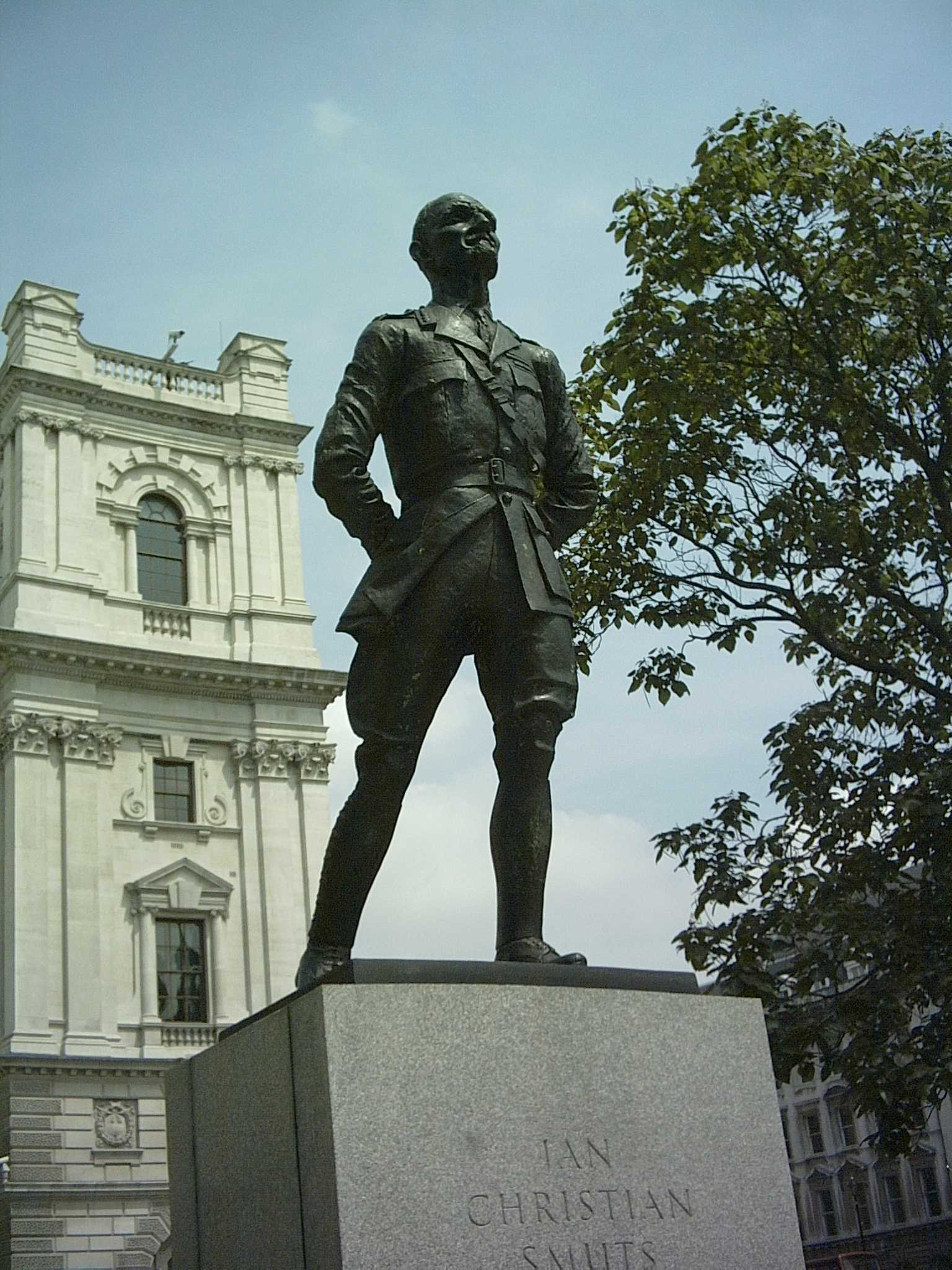
Statue in Parliament Square, London, by Jacob Epstein

One of his greatest international accomplishments was aiding in the establishment of the League of Nations, the exact design and implementation of which relied upon Smuts. He later urged the formation of a new international organisation for peace – the United Nations. Smuts wrote the first draft of the preamble to the United Nations Charter, and was the only person to sign the charters of both the League of Nations and the UN. He played a key role in the development of trusteeship and the League of Nations mandate system. He sought to redefine the relationship between the United Kingdom and her colonies, helping to establish the British Commonwealth, as it was known at the time. This proved to be a two-way street; in 1946 the General Assembly requested the Smuts government to take measures to bring the treatment of South African Indians into line with the provisions of the United Nations Charter.

In 1932, the kibbutz Ramat Yohanan in Israel was named after him. Smuts was a vocal proponent of the creation of a Jewish state, and spoke out against the rising antisemitism of the 1930s. A street in the German Colony neighbourhood of Jerusalem and a boulevard in Tel Aviv are named in his honour.

In 1917, part of the M27 route in Johannesburg was renamed from Pretoria Road to Jan Smuts Avenue.

The international airport serving Johannesburg was known as Jan Smuts Airport from its construction in 1952 until 1994. In 1994, it was renamed to Johannesburg International Airport following the fall of apartheid. In 2006, it was renamed again to its current name, OR Tambo International Airport, after the ANC politician Oliver Tambo.

In 2004, Smuts was named by voters in a poll held by the South African Broadcasting Corporation (SABC) as one of the top ten Greatest South Africans of all time. The final positions of the top ten were to be decided by a second round of voting but the programme was taken off the air owing to political controversy and Nelson Mandela was given the number one spot based on the first round of voting. In the first round, Field Marshal Smuts came ninth.

Mount Smuts, a peak in the Canadian Rockies, is named after him.

In August 2019, the South African Army Regiment Westelike Provinsie was renamed after Smuts as the General Jan Smuts Regiment.

The Smuts House Museum at Smuts's home in Irene is dedicated to promoting his legacy.

=== Orders, decorations and medals ===
Field Marshal Smuts was honoured with orders, decorations and medals from several countries.

South Africa

- Africa Service Medal
- Dekoratie voor Trouwe Dienst
- Efficiency Decoration
- Medalje voor de Anglo-Boere Oorlog
- Union of South Africa Commemoration Medal
- Victory Medal

United Kingdom

- 1914–15 Star
- 1939–1945 Star
- Africa Star
- British War Medal
- Defence Medal
- France and Germany Star
- Italy Star
- King George V Silver Jubilee Medal
- King George VI Coronation Medal
- Order of Merit 1947
- Order of the Companions of Honour 1917
- War Medal 1939–1945

Belgium

- Grand Cordon of the Order of Leopold II (1946)
- Grand Cross of the Order of the African Star (1948)
- Grand Officer of the Order of Leopold (1917)
- Croix de Guerre (1917)

Denmark

- King Christian X's Liberty Medal (1947)

Kingdom of Egypt

- Grand Cross of the Order of Muhammad Ali (1947)

France

- Commander of the Legion of Honour (1917)

Kingdom of Greece

- Grand Cross of the Order of the Redeemer (1949)
- Gold Cross of Valour (1943)

Netherlands

- Grand Cross of the Order of the Netherlands Lion (1946)

Portugal

- Grand Cross of the Order of the Tower and Sword (1945)

United States

- European-African-Middle Eastern Campaign Medal

== Sources ==
=== Primary ===
- Hancock, W. K.; van der Poel, J. (1966–1973). Selections from the Smuts Papers, 1886–1950. Vol. 7.
- Smuts, J. C. (1934). Freedom. Alexander Maclehose & Co. ASIN B006RIGNWS.
- Smuts, J. C. (1940). The Folly of Neutrality – Speech by the Prime Minister. Johannesburg: Union Unity Truth Service. OCLC 10513071.

=== Secondary ===
- Alanbrooke, Field Marshal Lord (2001). War Diaries 1939–1945. Phoenix Press. ISBN 1-84212-526-5.
- Beit-Hallahmi, Benjamin (1988). The Israeli Connection: Whom Israel Arms and Why. I. B. Tauris. ISBN 978-1850430698.
- Cameron, Trewhella (1994). Jan Smuts: An Illustrated Biography. Human & Rousseau. ISBN 978-0-798-13343-2.
- Colville, John (2004). The Fringes of Power. Weidenfeld & Nicolson. ISBN 978-0-297-84758-8.
- Crafford, F. S. (1943). Jan Smuts: A Biography. Kessinger Publishing. ISBN 1-4179-9290-5.
- Crawford, Neta (2002). Argument and Change in World Politics: Ethics, Decolonization and Humanitarian Intervention. Cambridge University. ISBN 0-521-00279-6.
- Crossman, R. H. S. (1960). A nation reborn;: A personal report on the roles played by Weizmann, Bevin and Ben-Gurion in the story of Israel. Atheneum Publishers. ASIN B0007DU0X2.
- Crowe, J. H. V. (2009). General Smuts' Campaign in East Africa. Naval and Military Press. ISBN 978-1-843-42949-4.
- Dugard, John (1973). The South West Africa/Namibia Dispute: Documents and Scholarly Writings on the Controversy Between South Africa and The United Nations. University of California Press. ISBN 0-520-02614-4.
- First, Ruth (1963). South West Africa. Penguin. ASIN B004F1QT50.
- Gooch, John (2000). The Boer War: Direction, Experience and Image. Routledge. ISBN 978-0-714-65101-9.
- Hancock, W. K. (1962). Smuts: 1. The Sanguine Years, 1870—1919. Cambridge University. ASIN B0006AY7U8.
- Hancock, W. K. (1968). Smuts: 2. Fields of Force, 1919–1950. Cambridge University. ISBN 978-0-521-05188-0.
- Heathcote, Tony (1999). The British Field Marshals 1736–1997. Leo Cooper. ISBN 0-85052-696-5.
- Howe, Quincy (1949). A World History of Our Own Times. Simon and Schuster. ASIN B0011VZAL6.
- Hunter, Jane (1987). Israeli Foreign Policy: South Africa and Central America. Spokesman Books. ISBN 978-0-851-24485-3.
- Kee, Robert (1988). Munich. Hamish Hamilton. ISBN 978-0-241-12537-3.
- Klieman, Aaron S. (1991). Recognition of Israel: An End & a New Beginning: An End and a New Beginning. Routledge. ISBN 978-0-824-07361-9.
- Mazower, Mark (2013). No Enchanted Palace: The End of Empire and the Ideological Origins of the United Nations. Princeton University Press. ISBN 978-0-691-15795-5.
- Smuts, J. C. (1952). Jan Christian Smuts by his son. Cassell. ISBN 978-1-920-09129-3.
- Spies, S.B.; Natrass, G. (1994). Jan Smuts: Memoirs of the Boer War. Jonathan Ball, Johannesburg. ISBN 978-1-868-42017-9.
- Woodward, David R. (1998). Field Marshal Sir William Robertson. Praeger. ISBN 0-275-95422-6.

Political offices
Preceded by New office	Minister for the Interior; 1910–1912	Succeeded by Abraham Fischer
Preceded by New office	Minister for Defence (first time); 1910–1920	Succeeded by Hendrik Mentz
Preceded by Henry Charles Hull	Minister for Finance; 1912–1915	Succeeded by Sir David Pieter de Villiers Graaff
Preceded by Louis Botha	Prime Minister (first time); 1919–1924	Succeeded by James Barry Munnik Hertzog
Preceded by Oswald Pirow	Minister for Justice; 1933–1939	Succeeded by Colin Fraser Steyn
Preceded by James Barry Munnik Hertzog	Prime Minister (second time); 1939–1948	Succeeded by Daniel François Malan
Preceded by Oswald Pirow	Minister for Defence (second time); 1939–1948	Succeeded by Frans Erasmus
Preceded by James Barry Munnik Hertzog	Minister for Foreign Affairs; 1939–1948	Succeeded by Daniel François Malan
Party political offices
Preceded by Louis Botha	Leader of the South African Party; 1919–1934	'Merged into United Party'
Preceded by James Barry Munnik Hertzog	Leader of the United Party; 1939–1950	Succeeded by Jacobus Gideon Nel Strauss
Academic offices
Preceded by Sir Wilfred Grenfell	Rector of the University of St Andrews; 1931–1934	Succeeded by Guglielmo Marconi
Preceded by The Prince of Wales later became King Edward VIII	Chancellor of the University of Cape Town; 1936–1950	Succeeded by Albert van der Sandt Centlivres
Preceded by Stanley Baldwin	Chancellor of the University of Cambridge; 1948–1950	Succeeded by The Lord Tedder
