= Bloemfontein Conference =

1899 Boer-British meeting on migrant workers

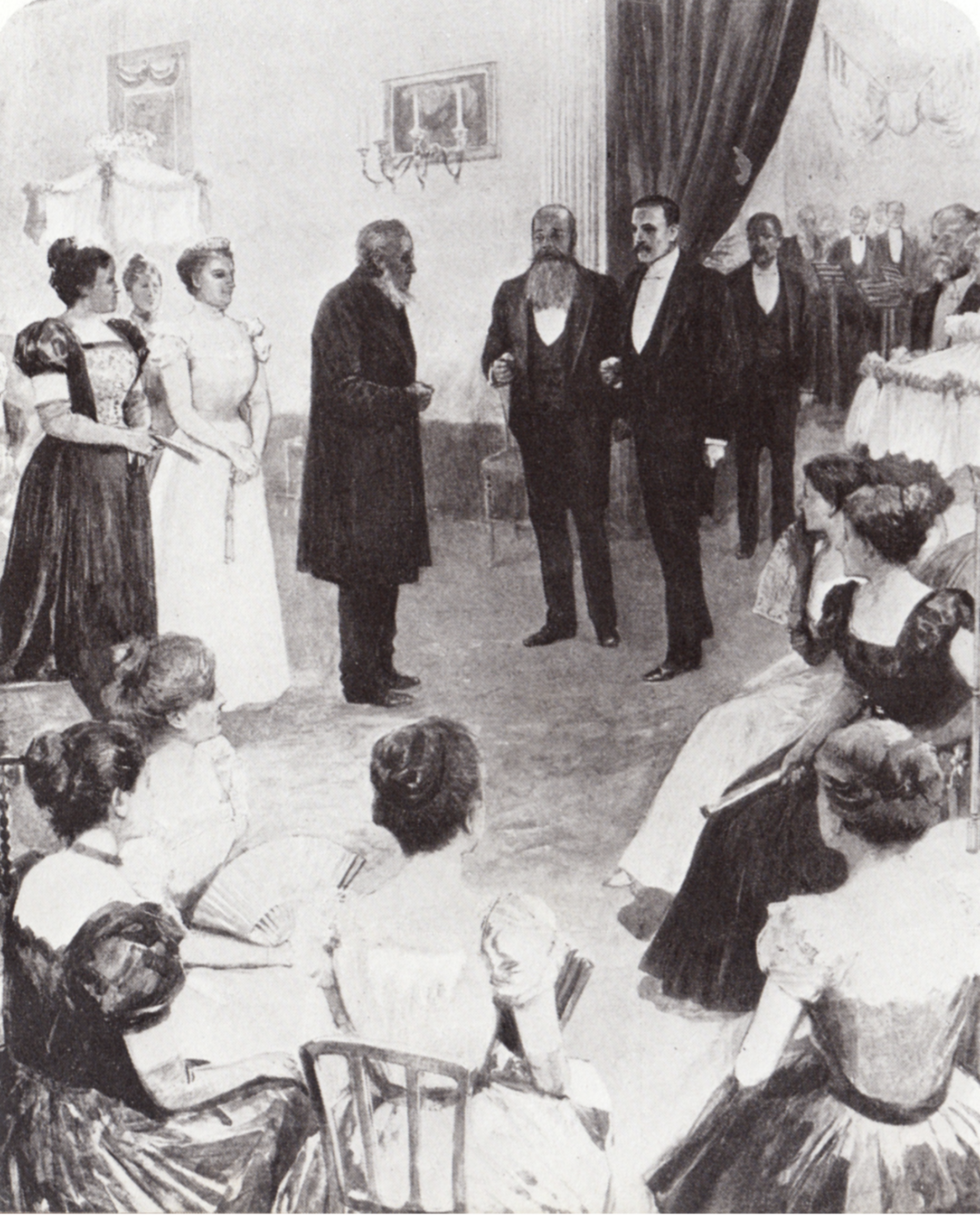
Reception for Lord Milner at President Steyn's, 31 May 1899

The Bloemfontein Conference was a meeting that took place at the railway station of Bloemfontein, capital of the Orange Free State from 31 May until 5 June 1899. The main issue dealt with the status of British migrant workers called "Uitlanders", who mined the gold fields in Transvaal.

The conference was initiated by Orange Free State president Martinus Theunis Steyn, in order to settle differences between Transvaal President Paul Kruger and British High Commissioner Alfred Milner. It was considered a last effort at reconciliation to prevent war between the two factions.

At the conference, Milner made three demands from Kruger:

- Enactment by Transvaal of a law that would immediately give Uitlanders enfranchisement and the right to vote.
- Use of the English language in the Volksraad of the South African Republic (Transvaal Parliament).
- All laws of the Volksraad would need to be approved by the British Parliament.

Kruger considered these demands an impossibility, however he was willing to reduce the period of Uitlander enfranchisement from the present fourteen years to seven years. Milner refused to compromise his original demands and, despite encouragement from British Colonial Secretary Joseph Chamberlain for him to continue the talks, Milner walked out of the conference on 5 June and no resolution concerning the fate of the Uitlanders was reached.

At this time, Milner composed a diatribe called the "Helot's Dispatch", which lambasted the Transvaal as a force that "menaces the peace and prosperity of the world".

== The Bloemfontein Conference ==
The Bloemfontein Conference was proposed by Afrikaner Jan Hofmeyr on 9 May 1899. It was held in the capital of the Orange Free State, with the intent of defusing a crisis between the Transvaal Republic and the British Empire. Of the three English demands (enfranchisement [voting rights], language, and suzerainty [foreign policy]) Colonial Secretary Joseph Chamberlain told Alfred Milner to place the Uitlander issue (enfranchisement) up front by asking for a five year retrospective franchise (five years of residency to be eligible to vote), the placement of at least 7 members of the Rand in the Volksraad, and if Kruger refused, to try municipal government enfranchisement (of English residents) and control of the police. If agreement couldn't be reached on this first, important point, there was no point in discussing other issues.

- 31 May 99 (2:30 to 4:30pm): "Rather discursive, and we did not get very far (on the franchise question, Kruger said it would be worse than annexation and the "freedom of the Republic would not exist any longer"). The tone was friendly. In the evening there was a huge reception at President Steyn's. Kruger was present for a little..." "The President rambles fearfully."
- 1 June 99: blank. Morning: Kruger asked about threatening movements of soldiers near his border, which Milner denied. Milner countered by asking about the transfer of Transvaal (Afrikaner) troops near Natal, and recent purchases of heavy weapons. Kruger replied that the weapons were defensive, for protection against enemies or wild animals. Also, he stressed that the Boers were never an attacking force, and that "as long as your Excellency lives you will see that we shall never be the attacking party on another man's land". Milner then brought the discussion back to the franchise. Afternoon: Kruger asked for time to consider Milner's proposals. He then talked about the Dynamite Monopoly (the Boers had a monopoly on dynamite). When asked to put his suggestions for reform in writing, Kruger said that would encroach upon his country's independence. Milner then asked Kruger to prepare a counterproposal on the franchise question, which he agreed to do. Kruger then asked about various other issues (the annexation of Zambaansland and Swaziland, Jameson Raid reparations, and arbitration), to which Milner said he would receive a reply.
- 2 June 99: blank. Morning: Kruger asked Milner to agree to a plan for international arbitration before he settled the franchise question, because he needed something to take back to his countrymen first. Milner replied that foreign interference would not be allowed, but some other form of impartial tribunal might be found. Milner then answered questions raised by Kruger at the end of the previous day, but nothing new was found. After a recess, Milner brought the topic back to the franchise, and asked for a serious discussion. He said he came "at a time of crisis in order to see if one big straightforward effort might not be made to avert a great disaster," and if they could not agree to discuss the matter on its merits, "everything else was a waste of time." One of Milner's aides reported to his mother, "Paul Kruger wept this morning." Afternoon: Kruger surprised Milner with a "complete Reform Bill worked out in clauses and subclauses" for a 7 year franchise to the Uitlanders (his previous stand was 14 years). However, it was nonretrospective and loaded with qualifiers. Kruger also added two conditions: Britain's acceptance of international arbitration for future disputes, and the Transvaal's annexation of Swaziland. Milner asked for time to consider it all.
- 3 June 99: "Meeting this morning, at which time I read a memo, explaining why I could not accept President's counter proposal. We adjourned after short discussion. We were to have met again in the afternoon, but soon after lunch I received a message asking that the meeting might be put off until 9:30am on Monday, to which I agreed..." The plan lacked an allowance for Volksraad seats, the franchise was prospective only, and most Uitlanders would have to forfeit their British citizenship five years before they received new citizenship. Also, Milner did not want to give in on arbitration. In his response, which took him most of the night to draft, Milner said the plan, while "a great advance", was so inadequate it would be a waste of time to consider its details. In reply, Kruger said he meant to ask the Volksraad to create 4 or 5 new electoral divisions, but he couldn't let his people to be swamped with strangers.
- 4 June 99: Sunday (day off). Milner telegraphed Joseph Chamberlain and said the "Conference seems likely to fail".
- 5 June 99: "Close of Conference, of course resultless. We met at 11:30 when I put in stiff memorandum, knocking about President's scheme. We adjourned for lunch. At 3 we met again. He adhered to his scheme and we parted at 4:30. Subsequently Hanbury and I went to say goodbye to President Steyn. Wild rush to send off telegrams..." Kruger would not go further without concessions, and said he was "not ready to hand over his country to strangers."

After the Conference broke up, Milner received a telegram from Chamberlain counseling patience and compromise with the Boers, who were used to "a good deal of haggling". Had he received the message earlier, Milner said the talks would have continued.

== Other ==
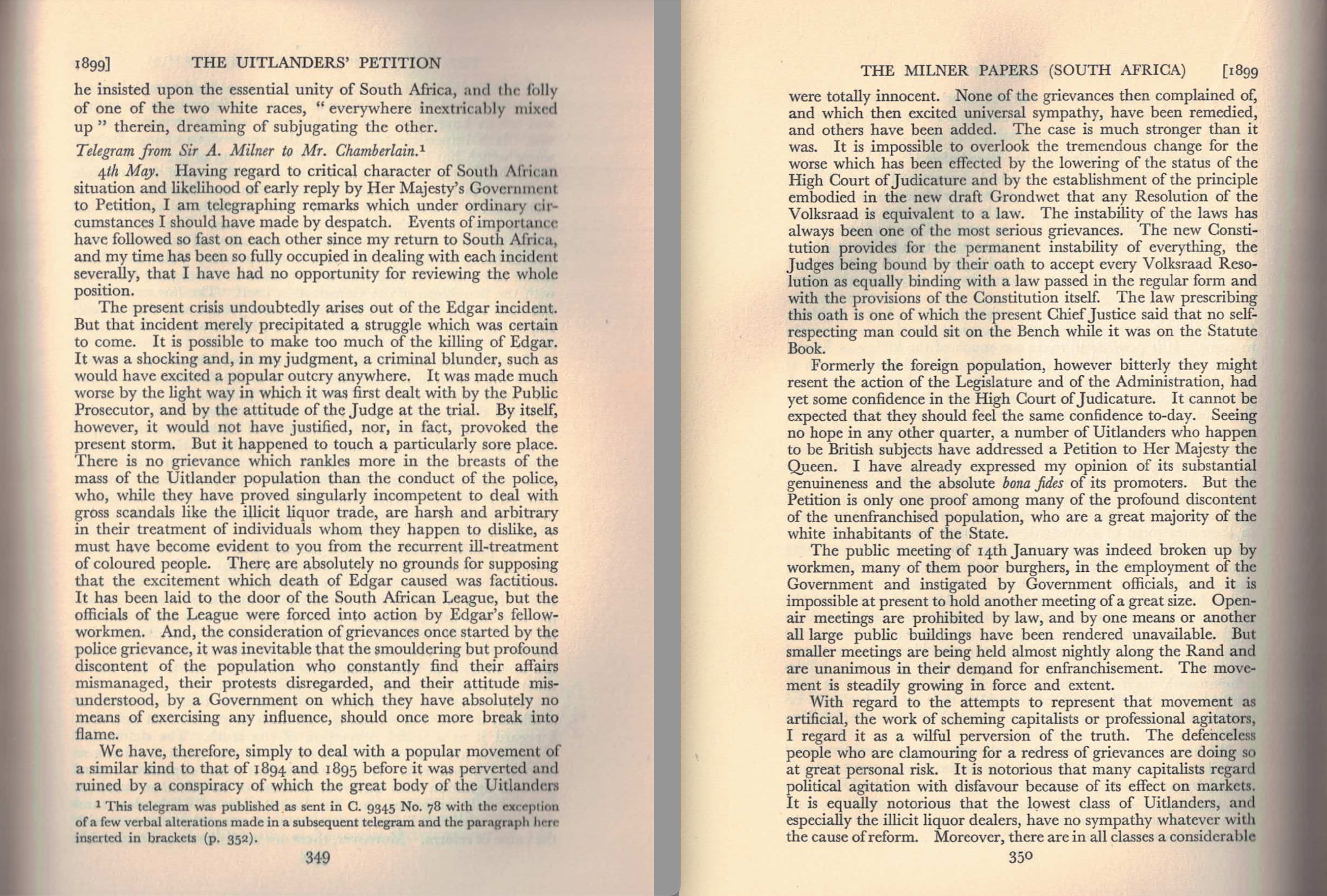
Milner Papers, helot dispatch, pgs. 349 & 350.

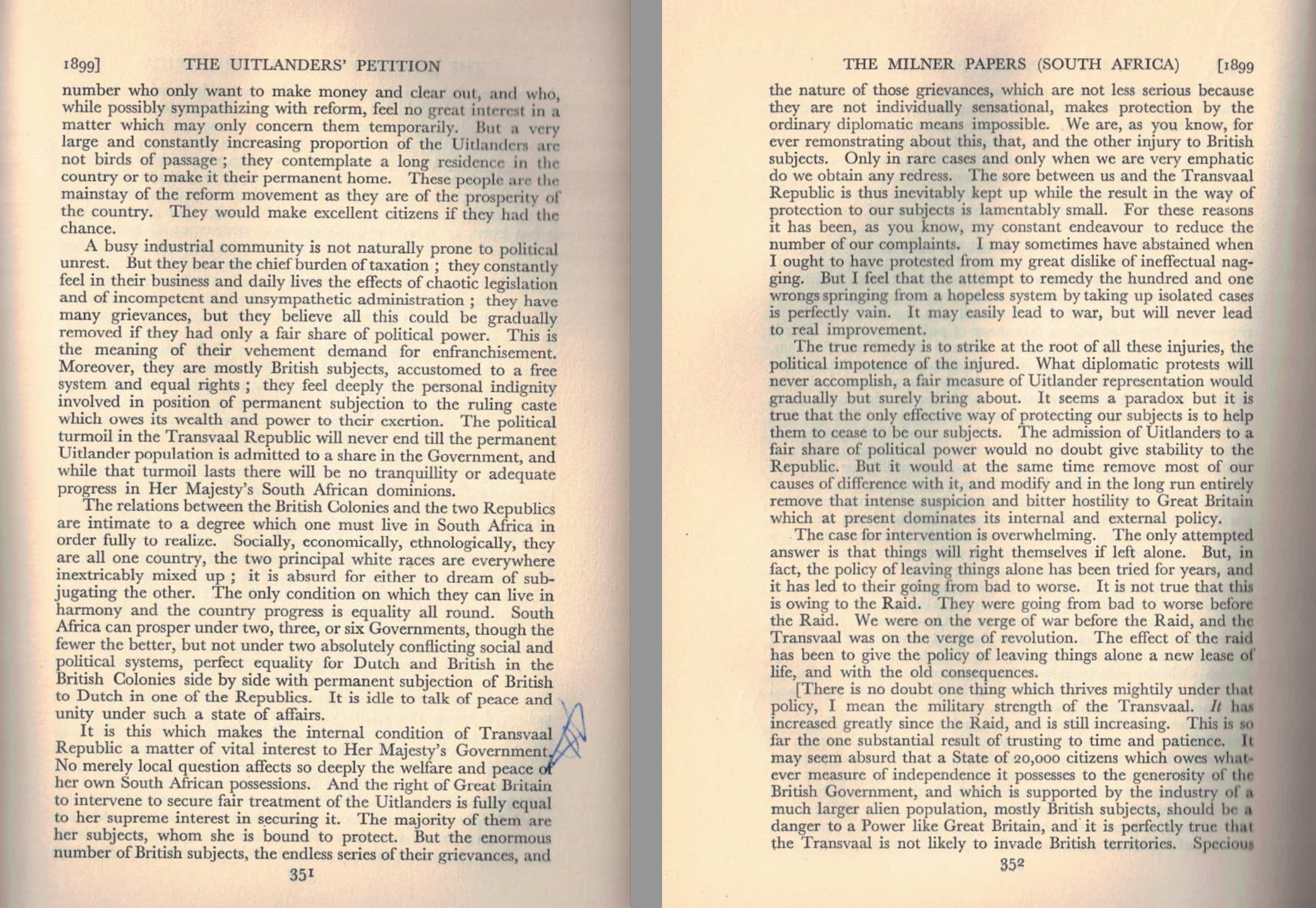
Milner Papers, helot dispatch, pgs. 351 & 352.

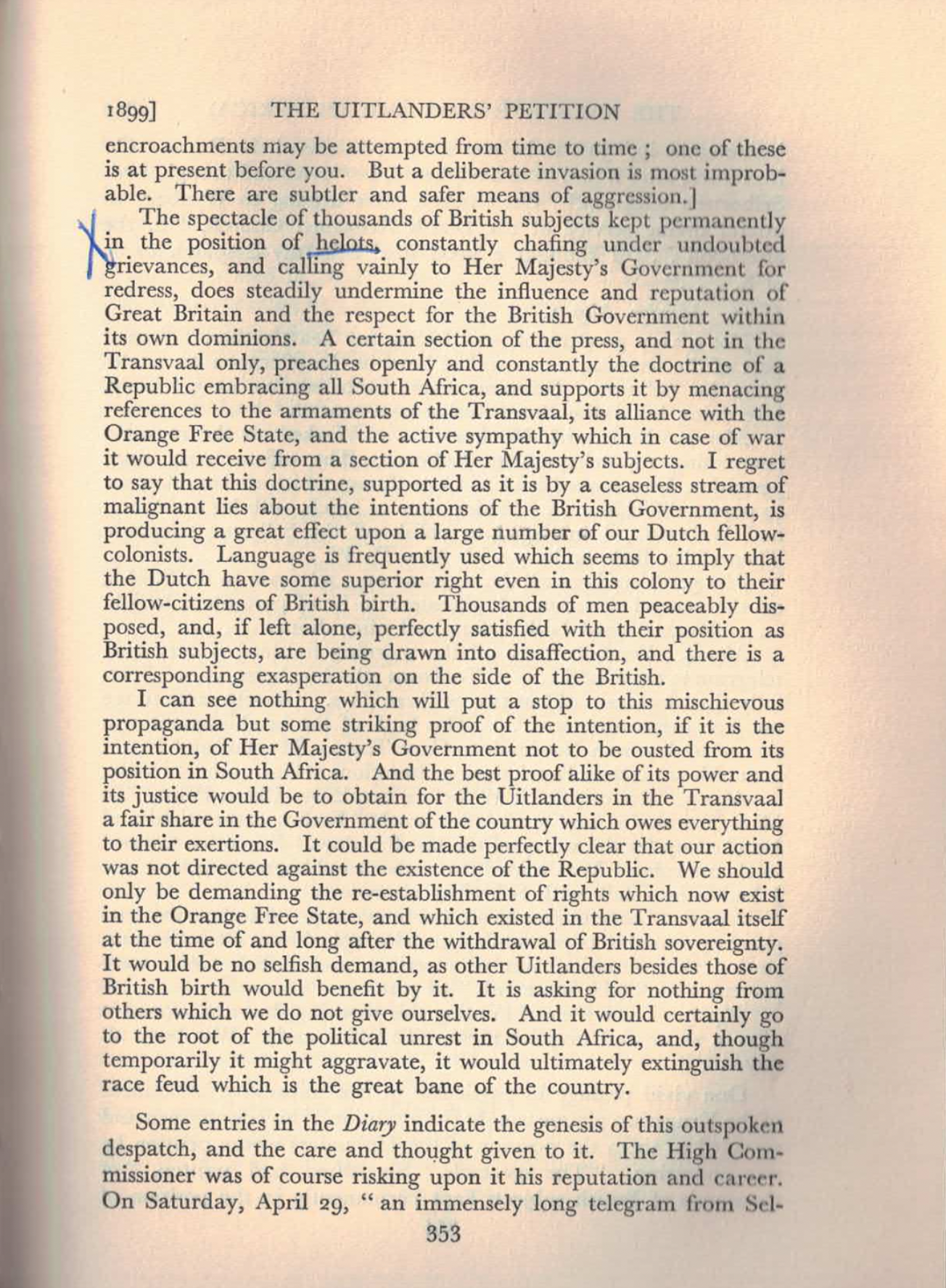
Milner Papers, helot dispatch, pg. 353.

Milner's Helot dispatch was sent to Joseph Chamberlain on 4 May 1899. From the time of Milner's arrival in Cape Town on 5 May 1897, until President Kruger's landslide election victory in February 1898, Milner was silent on the South African question. He then gave a speech in Middleburg on 3 March 1898, followed by a letter dated 9 May to his superior, Lord Selborne (Undersecretary of State for the Colonies, #2 in the Colonial Office, to Joseph Chamberlain). Later, when convinced the Boers would never agree to terms with the English, Milner sent the "Helot" dispatch (Helots were a caste of Greeks in ancient Sparta treated effectively as slaves by the Spartans). His letter said that two governments, one Boer and one English, cannot exist peacefully side by side.

Along with the timeline ...

- April 1898: Milner attends a banquet in Bloemfontein with President Steyn (of the Orange Free State). They have good relations.
- February 1899: Milner forwards a petition with 21,000 signatures from English residents of Johannesburg to Secretary of State Chamberlain. He demands a 5-year residency requirement for Uitlanders (English citizens working in the South African Republic) to become citizens of the Transvaal and Orange Free State. Joseph Chamberlain authorizes him to negotiate with President Kruger. However, the Boers refuse to offer the English living in their territory any political rights, with Kruger sticking to his hardline policy. This will lead to war 8 months later.
- 13 Aug 99: Milner receives a promising peace proposal from Jan Smuts, the Transvaal State Attorney General. However, its terms were later changed, and hardened, by President Kruger. Despite Smuts' statement on 25 August that his position was that of the government, and guaranteed, he was wrong.
- 8 Sep 99: Colonial Secretary Joseph Chamberlain rejects the new Boer peace proposal, but accepts the original one from Smuts. At the same time the British Cabinet orders 10,000 troops to South Africa, in addition to 12,000 already there, to defend against a possible Boer attack.
- 19 Sep 99: Milner sends British troops to protect Kimberley (Cape Colony), an obvious target if the Boers choose to attack.

== Timeline addressed ==
Because of controversy in England surrounding the Boer War, and the part High Commissioner Milner played in that war, author Cecil Headlam volunteered to sort through and organize Lord Milner's papers after his death in 1925, and to publish all of his correspondence with England when he was High Commissioner of South Africa from 1897 thru 1902. The result was a large, two volume set called "The Milner Papers", published in 1931 and 1933, respectively. With help from this work, the timeline below addresses Milner's other actions for the year prior to the outbreak of hostilities in the Second Boer War. This timeline reconciles one presented in "A Boer War Timeline" (see External Link). This timeline is in bold, dates prefaced with a star are difficult to verify, or not present, and where a cited source cannot be found, it is shown for future verification.

2 Nov 98: Start for home in Scot.

18 Nov 98: LM arrives in London on a working holiday. (Packenham, pgs. 30-31) Alfred contemplated making the trip at the beginning of August, but political events in SA delayed him. He needs to get his eyes checked, but more importantly, he wants a few hours of private talk with Chamberlain.

22 Nov 98, 2:30pm: LM meets with Chamberlain ("case for working up a crisis").(TP, pg. 31) Alfred puts the case for "working up to a crisis" to his boss, given Kruger's overwhelming election victory, his autocratic and reactionary style, his continuing to arm, and his race-oligarchy government. However, Chamberlain believes war can be averted and cautions patience, fallout from the Jameson Raid, the ultimate British aim being union, not war, and if war was to come, Kruger must start it.

25 Jan 99: LM leaves for SA. (pg. 34) He left for South Africa on the 28th, aboard the SS Briton.

5 Apr 99: LM to Selborne; vitriol. (pgs. 96, 97) Milner to Chamberlain: Uitlander workers were ordered to appear at a stadium and were attacked by Transvaal public works employees, in an orchestrated riot. Milner to Selborne: Lord Milner asks for all Uitlander abuses be published in a Blue Book, he lists 4 grievances, and adds, "I wish for goodness some of my vitriol could get in too". Lord Selborne reported to Joseph Chamberlain.

17 May 99: LM letter (pg. 98) To Selborne: Kruger is not capable of negotiating, so the upcoming meeting will likely fail. To Chamberlain: HMG had suzerainty over Transvaal since 1881.

AFTER THE BLOEMFONTEIN CONFERENCE

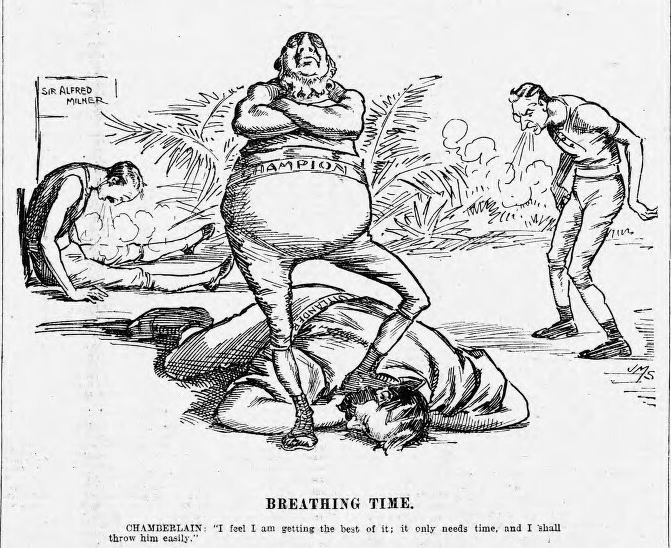
Breathing Time - JM Staniforth, "The Problem with Krugerism", 29 June 1899. Paul Kruger keeps his foot on the neck of the Uitlanders, having defeated the attempts of Milner and Chamberlain to dislodge him.

6 June 99: From Chamberlain: "The new situation which the failure of the Conference has created will be carefully considered by HMG, as soon as they receive your full despatches. Further instructions will then be given to you." Alfred replied, "I think ultimatum now would be premature..."

9 June 99: President Reitz of the Orange Free State approaches the British and proposes a treaty of arbitration, whose president would be neither Transvaal or British.

16 June 99: LM calls for large increase in Natal (telegram on file) 3 Aug 99: Chamberlain wires Alfred the HMG has decided to reinforce Natal with 2,000 troops.

* 24 June: LM rebukes Butler (WTS, pg 52) On the 24th, Lord Milner gives a speech in Cape Town. If he rebuked Butler, it was for siding with the Boers.

18 July: Kruger offers seven-year enfranchisement, completely retroactive. This franchise law is passed in the Transvaal on 20 July, but doesn't take effect until five years time, in 1904.

28 July: In Parliamentary debate in London, it was decided that a conciliatory message be sent to President Kruger. The British propose that a joint inquiry be held, by the Boer and British, to examine President Kruger's proposals.

* 1 Aug: LM invites the Transvaal to appoint delegates to discuss the offer (WTS, pg. 76)

12 Aug 99: A 7 year francise law is offered by Transvaal Attorney General Jan Smuts to Conyngham Greene, head of the British diplomatic mission in the Transvaal. The franchise was further reduced to 5 years, suzerainty would be tacitly dropped, and international arbitration would commence as soon as the franchise becomes law. The deal was forwarded to Alfred on 14 August.

15 Aug: a 5-year franchise is offered (WTS, pg 76; TC, pg 90) On 15 Aug., Alfred telegraphed Chamberlain to be careful of the new talks, as negotiations must be direct. On the 16th, Chamberlain replied that the government was bound to look into it, for if the offer was genuine, it could be the way out.

* 17 Aug: LM invites the Transvaal to appoint delegates to discuss the new offer (WTS, pg. 77)

* 21 Aug: An end to suzerainty and end to internal affairs is demanded by Kruger (TC, pg. 91)

* 24/25 Aug: Chamberlain decides war is inevitable and begins to take the lead in bringing it in.. On 24 August, Smuts's proposals were flatly refused by President Kruger.

26 Aug: Speech at Garden party shows turn of mind. TC, pg. 92 (Highbury speech). Joseph Chamberlain, learning that Smut's proposals were refused by Kruger, criticizes Kruger by saying, "he dribbles out reforms like water from a squeezed sponge", while "the sands are running down in the glass", and a "knot must be loosened...or we shall have to find other ways of untying it".

28 Aug: Chamberlain asks for a new peace conference in Cape Town based on Smut's proposals, to avoid the suzerainty matter, and arbitration that excludes foreigners.

* 2 Sep: Transvaal assumes joint inquiry of 7-year offer is still on and asks for proposals regarding time and place, assuming 'that it is not intended to interfere in internal affairs'. WTS p. 77

* 8 Sep: British Cabinet decides to send 10,000 troops to Natal including the 2000 sent in Aug. P96. The Cabinet is persuaded that in the face of such force, Kruger will back down and not fight. The reinforcements will include 5500 from India.

* 8 Sep: Chamberlain informs Boers that Britain cannot now go back to his own proposals which 19 Aug 'were a substitute' WTS p78 Demands withdrawal of conditions. On 8 Sep, Chamberlain makes a final appeal to the Boers, asking for a deal based on Smuts's terms.

16 Sep: Transvaal, via Reitz asks Britain to abide by its own proposal and 'cannot understand...' WTS p78 On the 16th, the Transvaal said it could no longer "comply with the far-reaching and insolent demands of the British Government".

* 16 Sep: Generals White and Cols Hamilton and Rawlinson sail for Durban via CT to take command of the larger force in Natal.

* 17 Sep: Troops in India embark for Natal.

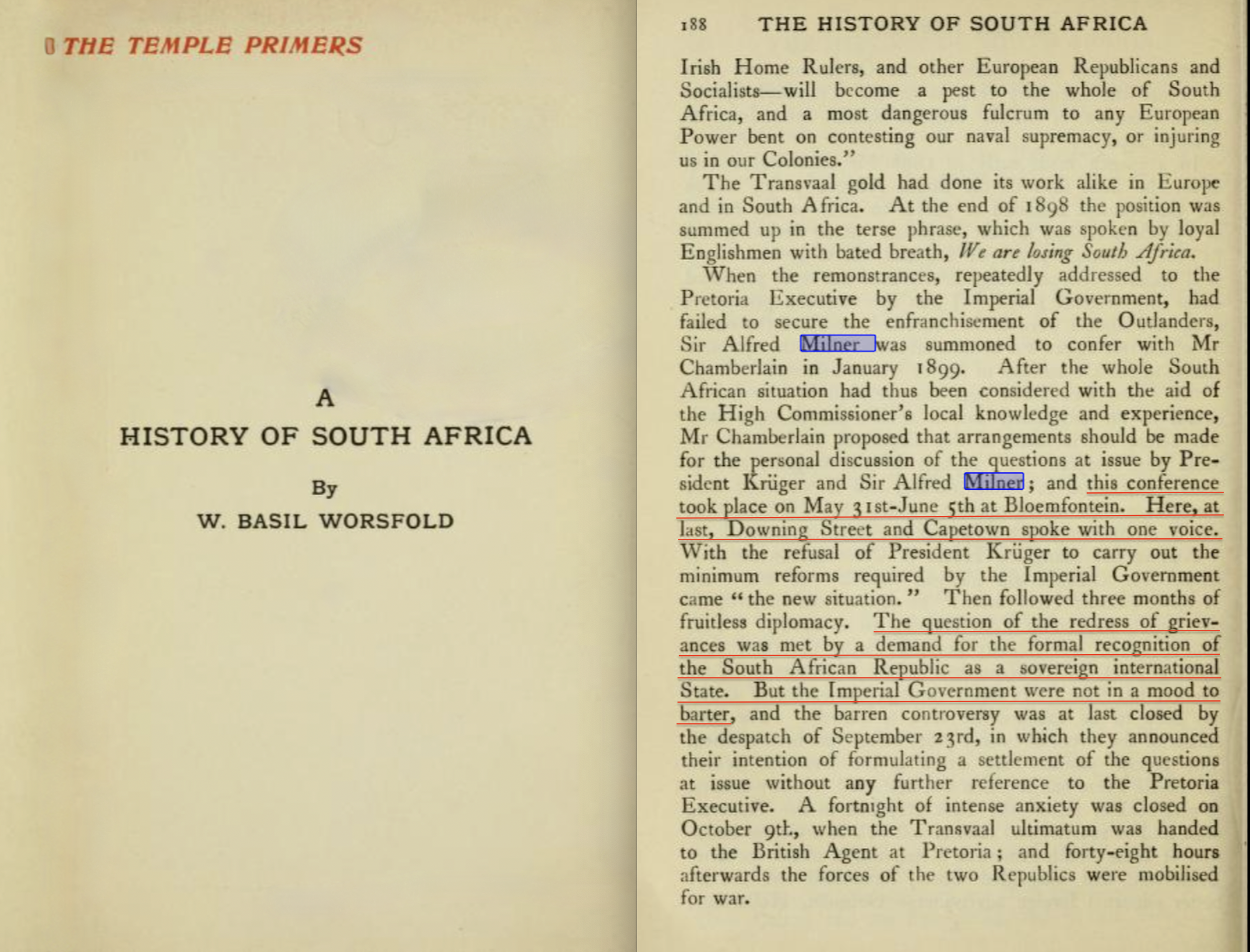
Summing up the problem: from William Basil Worsfold's, "A History of South Africa", 1900.

* 17 Sep: Transvaal Executive rejects British demands. TC p77

* 28 Sep: Transvaal forces mobilized.

* 2 Oct: OFS forces mobilized.

* 7 Oct: White lands at Durban and takes command of forces in Natal. Reinforcements disembark over next 2 days.

* 9 Oct: Ultimatum delivered by Reitz to Conningham-Greene. Britain decides to send the Army Corps of 50,000 men under Sir. General Buller.

* 11 Oct 99: BREAKOUT OF WAR.

== Middleburg Peace Talks ==
The Middleburg peace talks occurred between 28 February – 16 March 1901. Their breakdown caused General Kitchener to turn to draconian methods to fight the Boer guerrilla war.

After the Boers lost on the battlefield, they turned to guerrilla warfare. This was a surprise to General Herbert Kitchener, who resorted to depriving the enemy of sustenance by arresting farmers and civilians in the countryside and placing them in Concentration Camps. The war formally ended with the signing the Treaty of Vereeniging on 31 May 1902.

== Other Reading ==
- History of the Cape Colony from 1870 to 1899
- Kruger, Paul, "The Memoirs of Paul Kruger, Four Time President of the South African Republic", New York: Century, 1902, pgs. 277-289
- Marlowe, John, Milner, Apostle of Empire, London: Hamish Hamilton, 1976
