= Riebeek West =

Riebeek West Riebeek-Wes
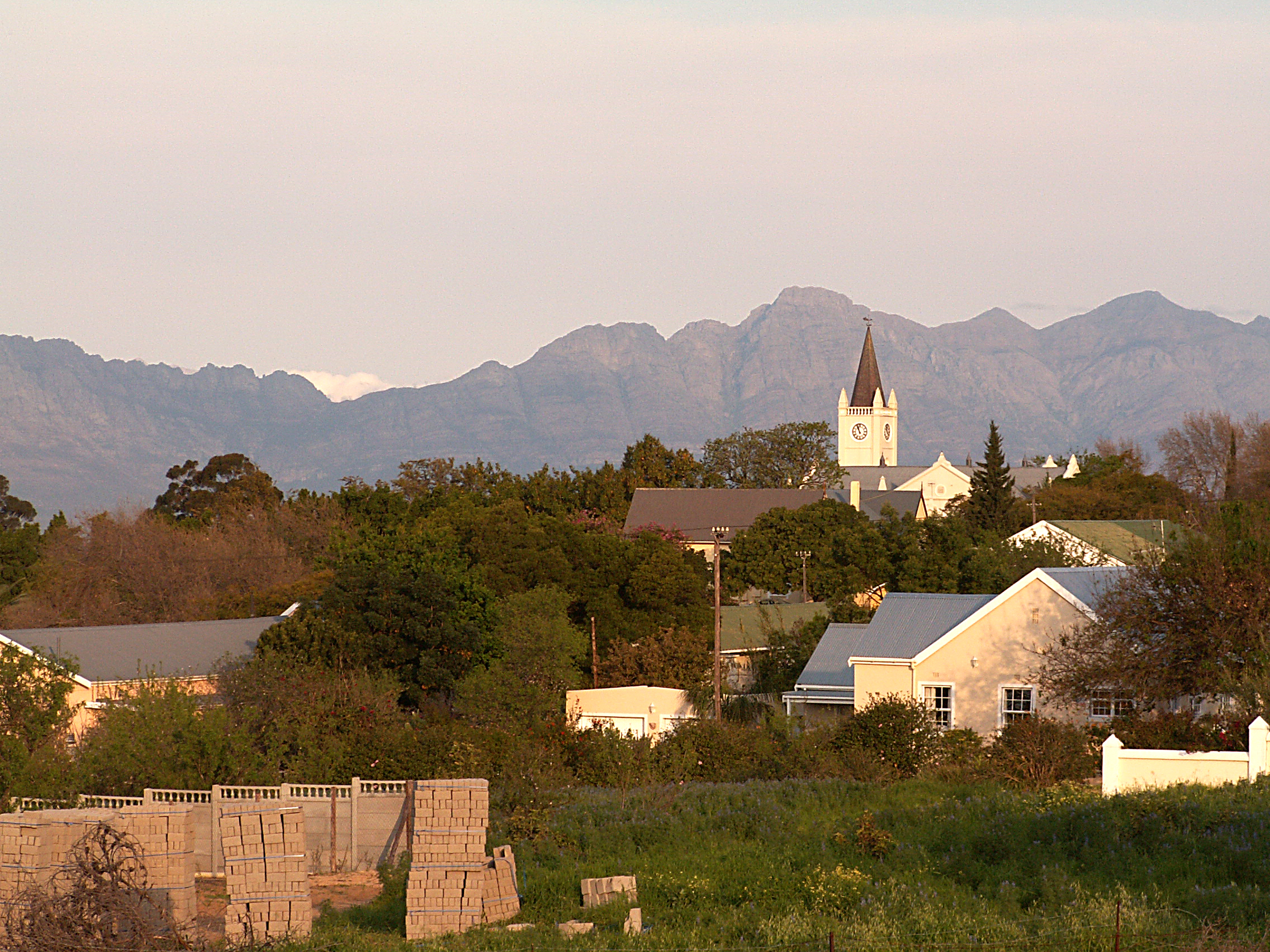
- Riebeek West

- Location within Western Cape Location within South Africa
- Coordinates: 33°21′1.69″S 18°52′2.52″E
- Country: South Africa
- Province: Western Cape
- District: West Coast
- Municipality: Swartland

Government
  - Councillor: Nicolene Smit (DA)

Area
  - Total: 3.43 km^{2} (1.32 sq mi)

Population (2011)
  - Total: 4,350
  - Density: 1,270/km^{2} (3,280/sq mi)

Racial makeup (2011)
  - Black African: 5.1%
  - Coloured: 83.6%
  - Indian/Asian: 0.6%
  - White: 10.5%
  - Other: 0.2%

First languages (2011)
  - Afrikaans: 93.6%
  - English: 4.2%
  - Other: 2.3%
- Time zone: UTC+2 (SAST)
- Postal code (street): 7306
- PO box: 7306
- Area code: 022

Riebeek West (Afrikaans: Riebeek-Wes) is a small town situated about 75 km north-east of Cape Town and 5 km north of its twin town Riebeek Kasteel in the Swartland area of the Western Cape, South Africa.

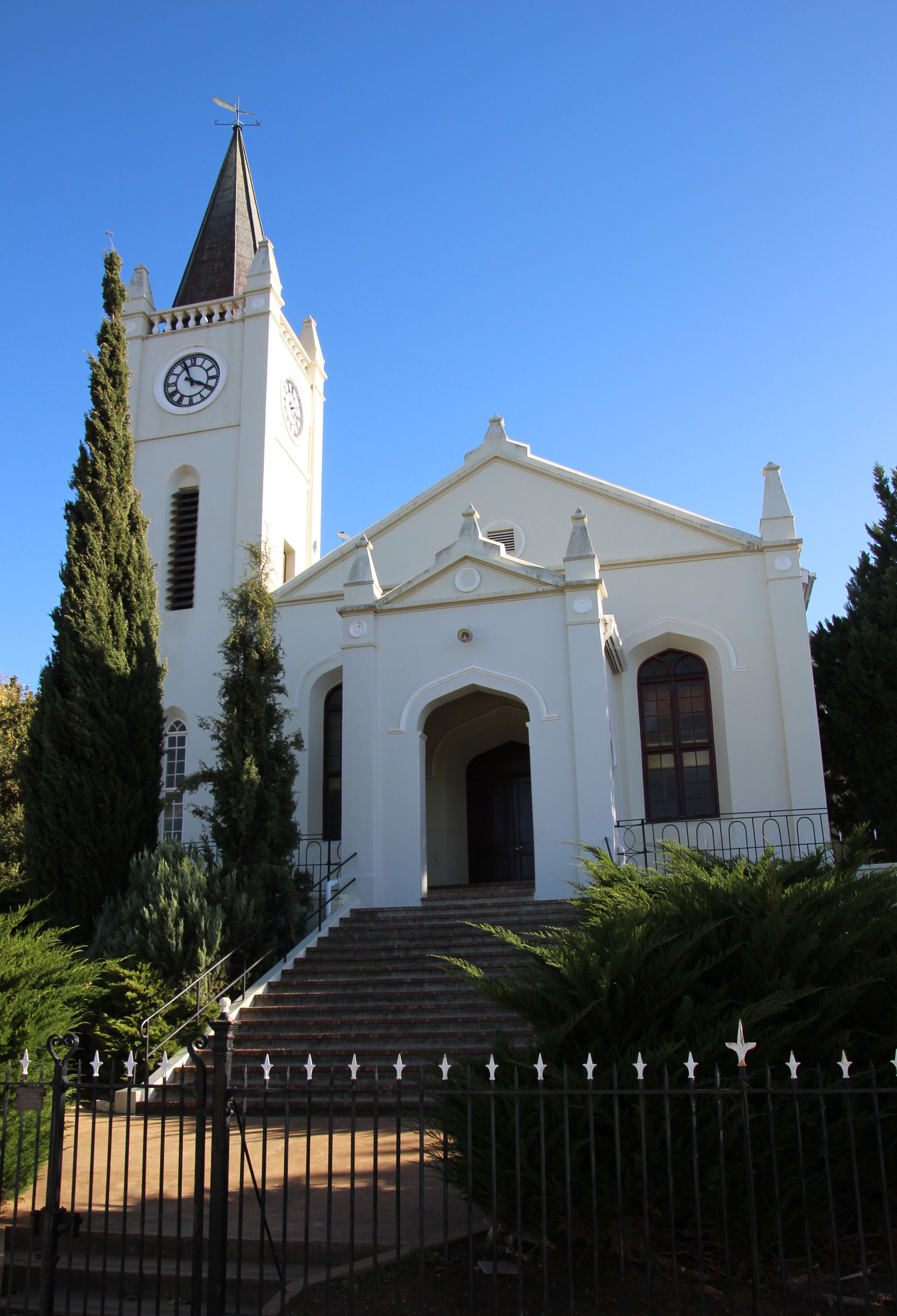
The Dutch Reformed church at Riebeek West

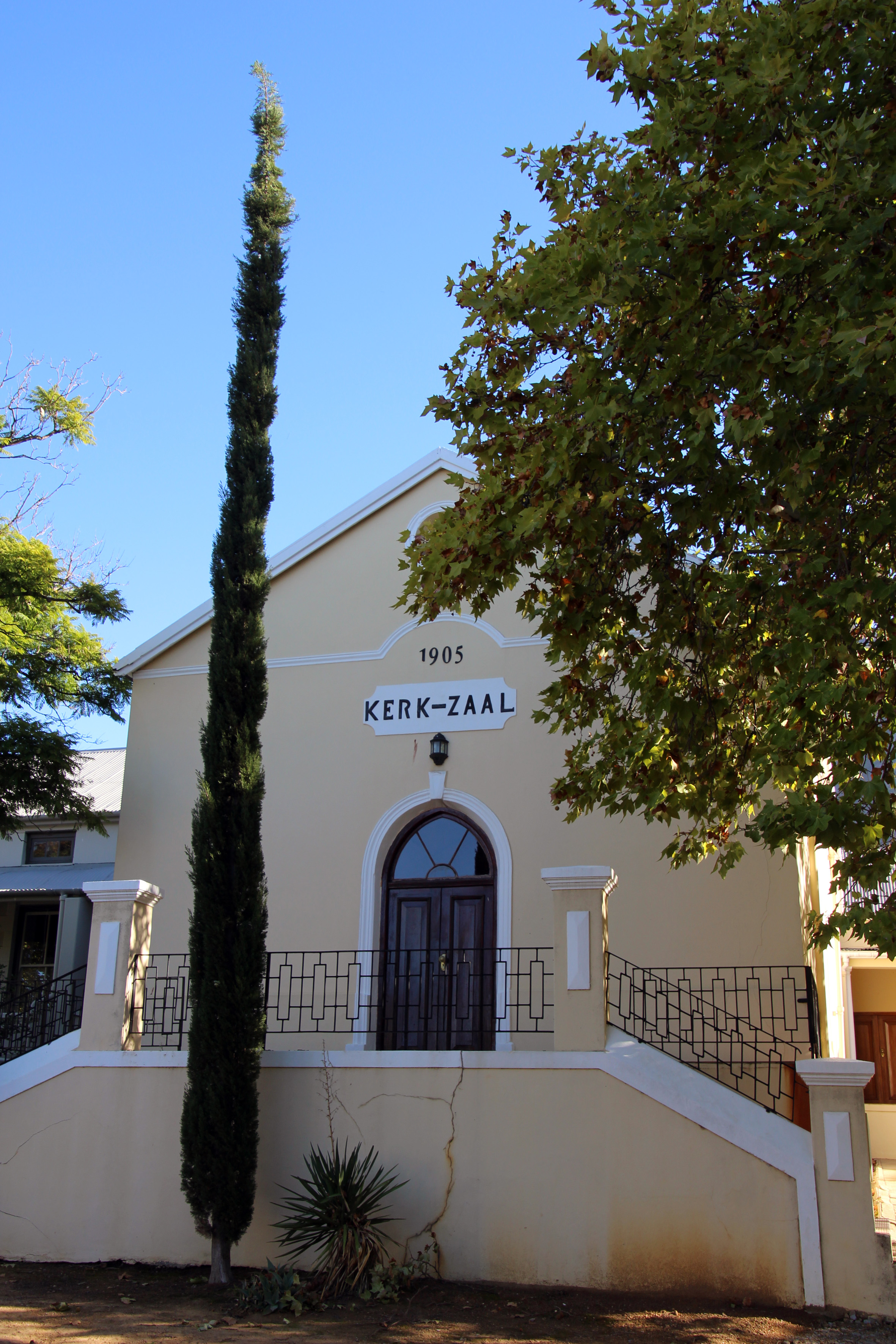
The hall of the Dutch Reformed church at Riebeek West

The Riebeek Valley would have been known to indigenous Khoi people, but was first described by a party of Cape Dutch explorers under the leadership of Pieter Cruythoff in 1661. The mountain, Riebeeck's Kasteel Berg (Riebeeck's Castle Mountain) was named after then Cape commander Jan van Riebeeck by this expedition and the settlements along the eastern slope of the mountain later derived their names from it. In translation from Dutch to Afrikaans the letter c in Riebeeck was dropped. The first settlers arrived in the area in the early 18th century. Riebeek West was established as a parish of the Dutch Reformed Church in 1858.

Riebeek West was the birthplace of two successive South African prime ministers. General Jan Christiaan Smuts was born on the farm Bovenplaats, two km north of Riebeek West on 24 May 1870. He served two terms as prime minister, from 1920 to 1924 as head of the South African Party and again from 1939 to 1948 as head of the United Party. With the general election of 1948, Riebeek West became a political hotbed with the leaders of the two main contesting parties both being from the village. Daniel François Malan was born on the farm Allesverloren, which abuts the town on the southern side, on 22 May 1874. In 1948 his National Party defeated the incumbent United Party under Smuts and Malan became prime minister until 1954.

Today there is a cement factory on Bovenplaats, but the house in which Smuts grew up is preserved as a national monument. Allesverloren has become a renowned wine estate with a restaurant.

The Riebeek Valley is known for its wheat, wines, and more recently, olives. It is popular for tourism, arts and crafts, and retirement. The Olive Festival is held annually early in May and the Berg River Canoe Marathon passes there in July.

The form Riebeek-Wes is preferred for official purposes.
