= Early life of Jan Smuts =

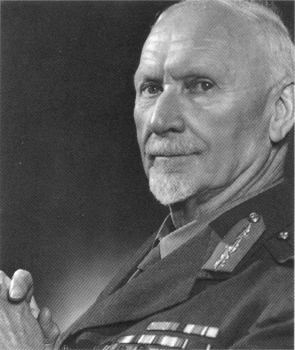
Jan Smuts

Jan Christian Smuts (a.k.a. Jan Christiaan Smuts), OM, CH, ED, KC, FRS (24 May 1870–11 September 1950) was a prominent South African and Commonwealth statesman, military leader, and philosopher. He served as a Boer General during the Boer War, a British General during the First World War and was appointed Field Marshal by King George VI during the Second World War. In addition to various cabinet appointments, he served as Prime Minister of the Union of South Africa from 1919 until 1924 and from 1939 until 1948. From 1917 to 1919 he was one of five members of the British War Cabinet, helping to create the Royal Air Force. He played a leading part in the post-war settlements at the end of both world wars, making significant contributions towards the creation of the League of Nations and the United Nations. He did much to redefine the relationship between Britain and the Dominions and Colonies, leading to the formation of the British Commonwealth.

Jan Smuts was born in 1870, the second son of a traditional Boer farming family. By rural tradition, the eldest son would be the only child to receive a full formal education; however, on the death of his elder brother in 1882, 12-year-old Jan was sent to school for the first time. After four years of education he had made exceptional progress, gaining admission to study at Victoria College in Stellenbosch. He graduated in 1891 with first-class honours in Literature and Science. With this strong academic background, he applied for, and won, the Ebden scholarship for overseas study, electing to read law at Christ's College, Cambridge. After further academic success, and the recipient of many prestigious academic awards, he graduated in 1894 with double First-class honours. After graduating, Smuts passed the examinations for the Inns of Court, entering the Middle Temple. In 1895, despite the prospect of a bright future in the United Kingdom, the homesick Smuts returned to South Africa.

== In South Africa ==
=== Childhood ===
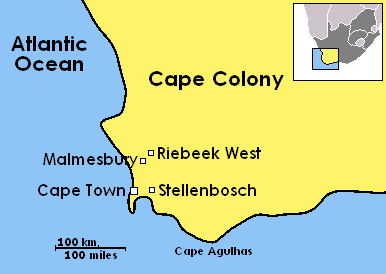
Smuts was born and raised in the district of Malmesbury, in the British Cape Colony.

On 24 May 1870, at the Smuts family farm, Bovenplaats, in the district of Malmesbury, Cape Colony, a child was born to Jacobus Smuts and his wife Catharina. This child, their second son in what was to become a family of four sons and two daughters, was christened Jan Christiaan after his maternal grandfather, Jan Christiaan de Vries. In addition to Dutch and French Huguenot ancestors, the Smutses claimed descent from the Khoi interpreter Krotoa.

The Smuts family were prosperous yeoman farmers, long-established in the area. For four generations, since 1786, they had farmed in the Malmesbury district, settling on the farm Ongegund, of which Bovenplaats was a part, in 1818. This area was part of the so-called Swartland, the chief wheat-growing area of the Cape Colony.

1870 found Bovenplaats under the care of Jacobus Abraham Smuts and his wife Catharina Petronella. Jacobus Smuts lived in much the same manner as his forefathers — a hard-working farmer, a pillar of the Church, and one who took a leading part in the social and political affairs of the neighbourhood. Such was the regard in which he was held that he was later to be elected as the Member for Malmesbury in the Cape Parliament. Smuts's mother, born Catharina Petronella de Vries, was the sister of Boudewijn Homburg de Vries, the predikant of the nearby town of Riebeek West, some three miles (4.8 km) from Bovenplaats. The de Vries family originated from the area around Worcester, Cape Colony. Catharina accompanied her brother as his housekeeper when he took up his appointment at Riebeek West, eventually meeting and marrying her husband in 1866. She was a woman of considerable education and culture, at least according to the standards of the area, having studied music and French in Cape Town.

When Jan was six years of age the family moved from Bovenplaats to a new farm some thirteen miles (21 km) away. This farm, Klipfontein, was a bequest to Jacobus Smuts, who, keen to have a farm of his own rather than one under the supervision of his father, moved his family there in 1876.

==== Family life ====
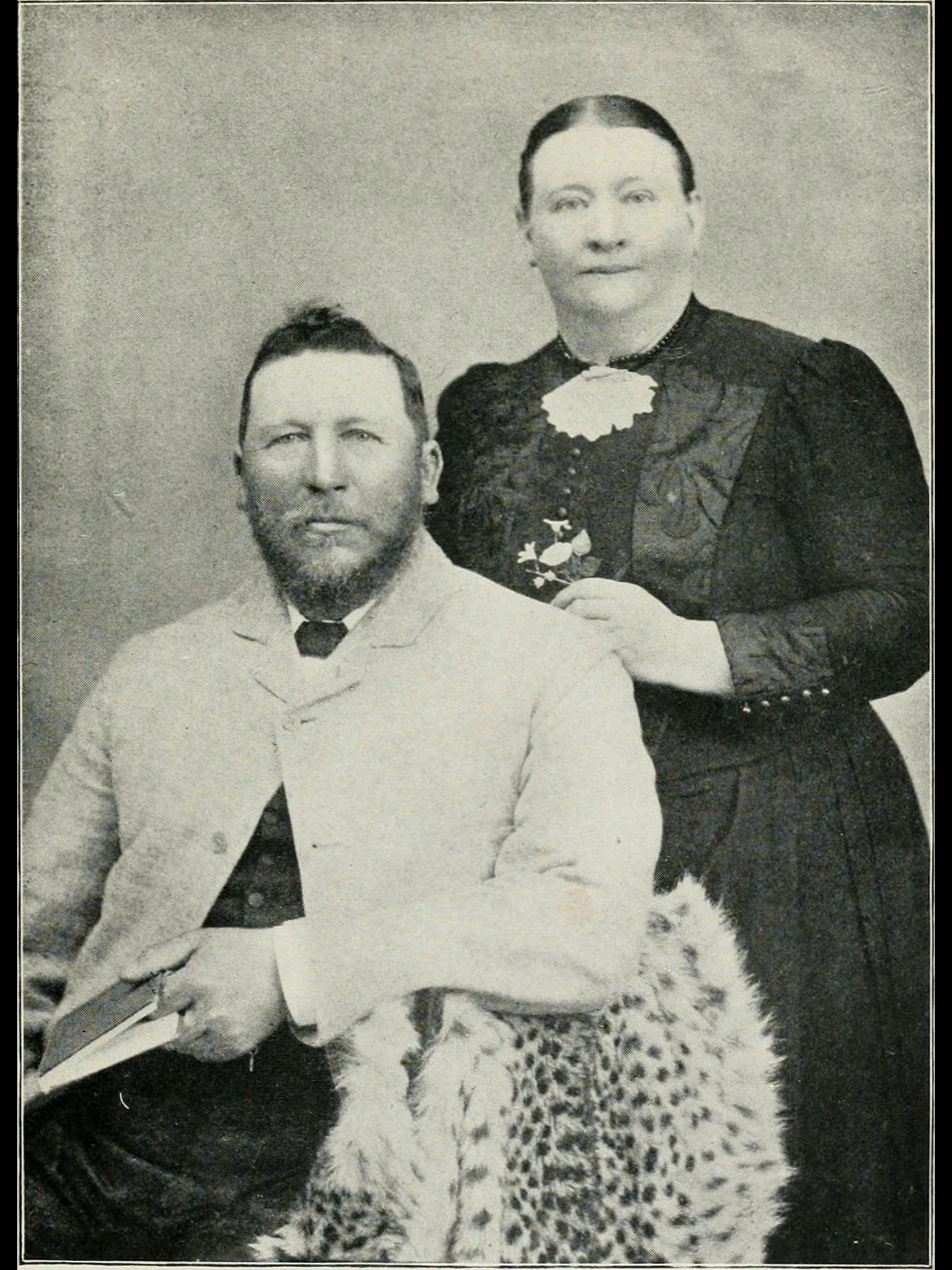
Jacobus and Catharina Smuts, 1893

The Smuts family were traditional Afrikaner farmers. As such, questions of property and family affairs were extensively governed by custom. Custom dictated that it was upon the first son that family expectations fell; the family would strive, so far as their means allowed, to provide him with the best possible education with the goal of paving the way for his entry into one of the professions. As for the others, they would be put to work on the farm, while at the same time receiving a rudimentary home education. As the second son this was to be Jan's role. While he remained at the farm, his elder brother, Michiel, was sent to begin his schooling in Riebeek West, destined, like his uncle Boudewyn, for a future as a predikant in the Dutch Reformed Church.

Farmwork combined with lessons from his mother — such was the order of Jan's life for the next few years. During his early childhood, still too young to be given formal responsibilities on the farm, Jan accompanied the Coloured farm labourers as they went about their daily work. At this time the relations between master and servant, between black and white, were certainly not based on social equality; nevertheless, on these Swartland farms there was little of the rigid segregation which was already emerging elsewhere in South Africa and which was later to have such profound consequences. Since 1828 the Cape had enshrined in law the principle of strict legal equality between the races. Unlike the rest of South Africa, all adult males, were entitled to vote and to stand for election to the Colonial legislature, subject only to a property qualification. In these country districts therefore, there existed a certain intimacy between the farm owners and their labourers. At harvest times it was common to find both working together to gather in the crops and it was also commonplace to find the farm's children playing with one another, irrespective of race.

In this relatively liberal environment Jan accompanied the servants in their work, listening to their stories, learning the ways of the countryside, and trying to help as best he could. As his knowledge and confidence increased Jan began to go out into the countryside by himself, exploring the hills and valleys which surrounded him. Later, as an older boy, his chief responsibility was as a herd — first of the pigs and poultry in the farmyard, and later of the cattle out on the veld. The same laws of custom which had preordained Jan's role as a farmer also had their beneficial aspect; Boer farmers customarily allotted their sons a share of the natural increase of the beasts under their care. As time passed Jan gradually built up a respectable holding of livestock.

At home, away from the work of the farm, his education was not neglected. Although restricted to rudimentary home schooling, his mother's own notable education placed him and his siblings at an advantage compared with other children in similar circumstances.

==== Outside influence ====
The Smuts family lived in an almost exclusively Afrikaner world. Nevertheless, this cultural identity, unlike that of the Boer republics to the north, did not define itself on opposition to Britain or the British. Swartland farmers had been largely insulated from the causes of discontent of earlier years, discontent which eventually culminated in the mass Boer migrations of the Great Trek. As a result, Jacobus Smuts largely unmoved by the Afrikaner nationalism preached by such organisations as the Afrikaner Bond, founded by Rev. SJ du Toit in 1877. After 1884, having come under the leadership of Jan Hendrik Hofmeyr, the Bond became more to the Smuts' taste. Hofmeyr changed the fundamental basis of the organisation, from one preaching Afrikaner separatism to one which combined a pragmatic policy of economic protectionism for Cape farmers and their produce with a call for unity between the English and Dutch-speaking populations and cooperation with the Colonial authorities. As a member of the Cape legislature Jacobus Smuts pledged his support to Hofmeyr and the reformed Bond.

Unlike many parts of South Africa, conflict was an element largely absent from Jan Smuts's early life. Whether conflict between Briton and Boer, or conflict between Black and White — it had been many years since the farmers of the Swartland had had to deal with turmoil on their doorsteps. The absence of conflict, along with its inevitable counterpart, development of prejudice, had its effect upon Smuts.

In later years Smuts was to look upon this time with the uttermost fondness. Of all his childhood experiences it was the time spent out on the veld, whether tending the cattle or out on excursions of his own, which seemed to have the most marked effects on him, developing an attachment which was almost spiritual in nature. As he wrote in 1902, aged 32:

How well I remember the years I spent tending the cattle on the large farm, roaming over all its far expanse of veld, in which every kloof, every valley, every koppie was endeared to me by the most familiar associations. Month after month I had spent there in lonely occupation — alone with the cattle, myself and God. The veld had grown part of me, not only in the sense that my bones were a part of it, but in that more vital sense which identifies nature with man ... Having no human companion, I felt a spirit of comradeship for the objects around me. In my childish way I communed with these as with my own soul; they became the sharers of my confidence.

In ordinary circumstances Jan Smuts would have, in time, taken over the running of the family farm, spending his life as a farmer as his father, grandfather, and great-grandfather had before him. However, this was not to be; events were to conspire to change this predetermined fate.

=== Schooldays ===
In 1882 tragedy struck the Smuts family. Their eldest son, Michiel, suddenly succumbed to typhoid while attending school at Riebeek West. This time of family grief and upheaval had a direct effect upon Jan; now, as the eldest son, the weight of family expectation fell squarely upon his shoulders.

Within weeks Jan was sent from the familiar surroundings of Klipfontein to a boarding house at Riebeek West, to take his brother's place at the school of Mr TC Stoffberg. As had been the case with his brother, his parents had already mapped out his future; like his brother Jan was destined for a future in the Dutch Reformed Church, to be ordained as a predikant at the conclusion of his studies. This vocation, though imposed upon him by his parents, was by no means regarded as an imposition by Jan, growing up as he had in an environment where adherence to the Church and piety of deeds counted for a good deal. This upbringing had turned twelve-year-old Jan into a deeply religious, serious-minded boy. Now, attending school for the first time, he faced a number of obstacles. Foremost amongst these was his rudimentary grasp of English, at a time when it was the main medium of instruction and crucial for any Afrikaner who wished to play a role in wider Cape society. Thanks to his mother's efforts. in this as well as in other subjects, he was better prepared than most children in similar circumstances, but nevertheless he was to start his schooling alongside children many years younger than himself with many years of study separating him from his contemporaries.

Even so, despite these disadvantages, Jan proved himself an outstanding scholar. He surpassed the other children both in terms of innate ability and in terms of dedication to his work. It was not for nothing that his headmaster, Mr Stoffberg, described him as "one of the most brilliant pupils he had ever taught, and the most hard-working boy he had ever met." Within three years Jan had made sufficient progress to have caught up with his age group, children with up to ten years of formal education behind them. He compounded this remarkable achievement when the time came for him to sit the Cape Colony elementary examination in 1885; Jan was placed ninth in the entire colony. The next year he surpassed even this, coming second in the School Higher examination.

During these few years at Riebeek West Jan worked assiduously at his studies — self-evidently, given his achievements. His academic abilities were soon noted by his headmaster, who went out of his way to provide Jan with further curricular reading. Yet this was to prove insufficient to meet what was becoming an almost insatiable thirst for knowledge. Jan borrowed books and yet more books from the headmaster, poring over them at all times rather than engaging in the childish pursuits of the other children, separated from them by his strong work ethic. A few weeks before the School Higher examination this had its consequences — Jan fell ill, an illness exacerbated by his unremitting study. With a strict injunction from his doctor, ordering a complete rest with an absolute prohibition on work and reading, Jan was packed off to bed. Nevertheless, despite the doctor's orders, Jan went to strenuous lengths to evade the ban. One story told of him during this enforced convalescence describes how he used to involve the headmaster's youngest son in his subterfuges, bribing the four-year-old child to bring him books from his father's study. This enjoyed considerable success until the day of an unannounced visit from the headmaster's wife. In his sparsely furnished room there were few possibilities, but Jan made the best job that he could of concealing his by now substantial collection of books. The headmaster's wife upon entering the room found Jan, as expected, in bed. However, the boy did not look to be comfortably resting as he ought, in fact he looked positively uncomfortable. She offered to make Jan's bed for him, he declined, insisting that he was perfectly comfortable; she insisted and, being the headmaster's wife, got her way. Embarking upon her deed of kindness she found, to her astonishment, the real reason for Jan's restlessness — underneath his bedclothes he was making a valiant effort to conceal an immense pile of contraband books!

This dedication to reading and study might, in another boy, have been nothing more than a reaction to the impending examinations — but not in Jan's case. What made this particular episode revealing was that the books found under his bedclothes were largely unconnected with his studies. In Riebeek West he developed a lifelong habit, that of reading avidly outside the prescribed curriculum, seeking knowledge for its own sake.

In 1886, at the age of sixteen, Jan embarked on the next stage of his education. Jan applied to, and was accepted by, Victoria College, Stellenbosch — one of the most prominent institutes of higher education in the Cape. In late 1886 he bade farewell to Riebeek West, ready to embark upon a new stage in life.

=== Life in Stellenbosch ===
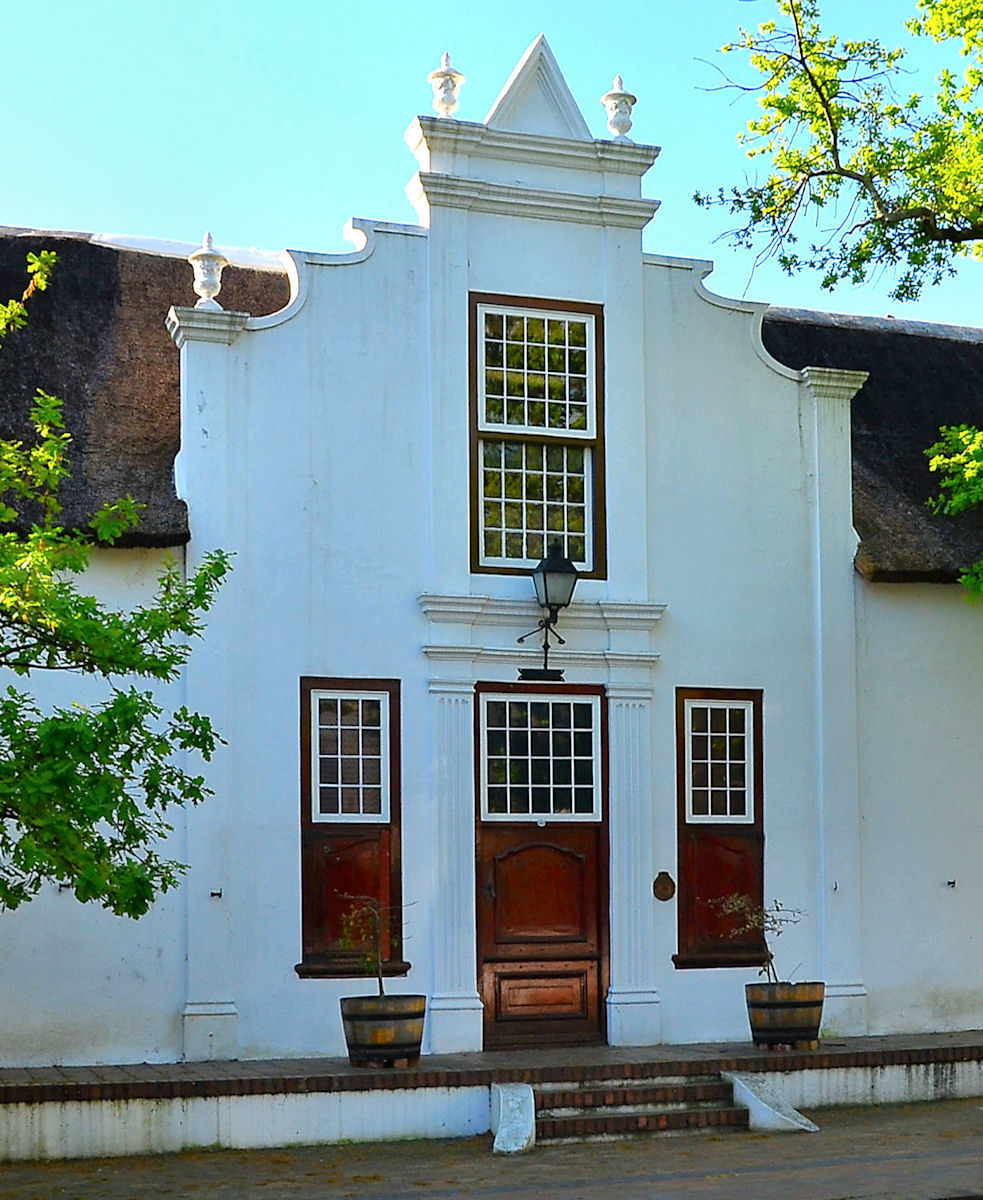
Ackermann House in Stellenbosch where Smuts lodged as a student

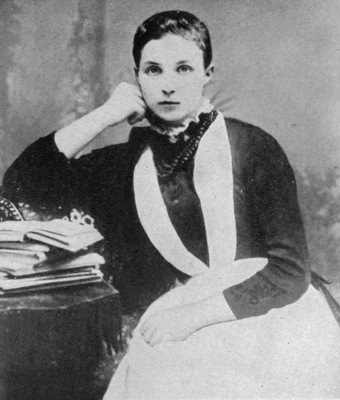
Isie Krige, 1889

Mr Stoffberg's school did not take its pupils to the final stage of secondary education. Before Jan could set his schooldays behind him and commence his higher education he would have to sit the Matriculation exam. Jan duly moved from Riebeek West to Stellenbosch, spending early 1886 to late 1886 preparing for this test.

At Riebeeck West Jan had been a hard-working, deeply religious child, with a strongly reserved, almost solitary, nature. This disposition, a legacy of his pious, rural upbringing, is manifest in what is his earliest surviving letter. This letter, written to Professor C Murray, a tutor at Victoria College, was for the most part a run-of-the-mill enquiry into the administrative arrangements for the forthcoming term. Yet in amongst this mundane request for information on such matters as textbooks and school fees Jan found himself confiding his innermost motive forces to this stranger. As he wrote:

... such a place [Stellenbosch] where a large puerile element exists, affords fair scope for moral, and what is more important, religious temptation, which, if yielded to, will eclipse alike the expectations of my parents and the intentions of myself ... For of what use will a mind, enlarged and refined in all possible ways, be to me, if my religion be a deserted pilot and morality a wreck? To avoid temptation and to make the proper use of my precious time, I purposely refuse to enter a public boarding department, as that of Mr de Kock, but shall board privately (most likely at Mr N. Ackermann's) which will, in addition, accord with my private and reserved nature.

In the event, Smuts's resolution to "make the proper use of my precious time" overcame such moral and religious temptations as a small town like Stellenbosch was capable of providing. Religion and his studies – these remained unchallenged as the twin poles of his existence during his matriculation year. In the seclusion of Mr Ackermann's boarding house Jan studied assiduously, attended church with zeal, and ignored the blandishments of the "puerile element".

The Matriculation exam tested candidates on five subjects: Latin, Greek, Mathematics, Science, and English Literature. By exam-time this dedication to his studies had paid off spectacularly; the 1887 Cape lists placed Jan third overall, with the highest marks in the Colony in Greek. In what had been by any standards a year of tremendous success the latter achievement was especially outstanding; a misunderstanding at the start of the year led Jan to believe that he would be exempted from the Greek exam – as a result it was a subject which he largely disregarded. Six days before the exam this potentially devastating oversight was exposed – there was now less than a week in which to catch up with a year's study. Jan immediately shut himself away in his rooms, spending the next days in total seclusion, working from sunrise to sunset in the attempt to master the grammar and vocabulary upon which he was shortly to be tested. By the time of the exam this hard work had paid off. Within a relatively short period Jan had largely memorised his books and had mastered the Greek language to a remarkable degree.

Smuts's determined work ethic played a central role in these successes, yet he was also aided in no small part by his formidable memory. At that age Jan found himself able to memorise large portions of book simply by reading through them, and though this ability gradually diminished as the years passed, it never entirely disappeared. As his son was later to recount:

[at] Stellenbosch his examiners were, until they learned to understand this prodigy, inclined to accuse the youngster of cribbing, for many of his answers were verbatim from the text-book. At Stellenbosch his facility for memorising was at its peak...

With the hurdle of Matriculation behind him the start of the 1887 term finally saw Smuts admitted as a student of Victoria College and enrolled as an undergraduate of the University of the Cape of Good Hope.

==== Victoria College ====
Victoria College proved fertile grounds for Smuts's imagination. As his biographer WK Hancock was to write:

The small teaching body, hardly more that [sic?] half a dozen men, covered a wide curriculum: but the students were also few and sifted for quality. Teachers and students were able in consequence to enjoy close individual contact with each other and ... they were able to work in an atmosphere of leisure.

Smuts thrived in this environment. With these new vistas of knowledge and learning now revealed that he spared no effort in his attempts to master them. His surviving notebooks from this period reveal the range and breadth of his studies: Latin, Greek, German, the Classics, Optical Physics, Inorganic Chemistry and Metallurgy, Organic Chemistry and Agriculture, and Geology - to name but a few. Once again, as had been the case at Riebeek West, this was not merely study for the sake of exams - as ever, Smuts continued to study avidly outside the confines of the curriculum.

Over the next few years at Victoria College, Smuts's religion continued to be of crucial importance. On Sundays he would attend both morning and evening church services, also leading a Bible study class for local Coloured boys, and during the week he was an assiduous attendee at evening prayer meetings. Within Victoria College, one of the strongest friendships he formed was with Professor JI Marais, the head of the Theology faculty.

Smuts's religious observance was unsurprising in one who whose moral outlook was based exclusively upon Biblical teachings and who was destined for a future in the Church. Yet, though religion continued to serve in this central role, his studies at Stellenbosch, with their decidedly scientific bias, led Smuts towards a more critical examination of his faith. From this time onwards Smuts was, by gradual degrees, to start to move away from the uncompromisingly Calvinist outlook within which he had been raised.

If Stellenbosch marked Smuts's intellectual awakening, it also was where he came to mature socially. Here he began to cast off the shyness and reserve which afflicted him, joining the local militia, becoming a regular contributor to the college magazine, and becoming leader of the Victoria College debating society. For the first time, in both verbal and literary debate, Smuts began to grapple with the political and social issues facing South Africa.

Though Smuts did much to cast off his shyness and reserve, he made few hard-and-fast friendships at Stellenbosch. Yet it was here that he met the woman who was to play a central role in his life thereafter. Sybella Margaretha Krige, known to all as Isie, was the daughter of Japie Krige, a prominent local wine and dairy farmer. Six months younger than Smuts, she had shared a similar upbringing with much the same resulting character traits. As their son, also name Jan Christian, was later to write:

There was nothing particularly romantic about the courtship. They were rather reserved and undemonstrative, and from questioning and teasing our mother, we decided that it was rather an odd and old-fashioned courtship. ... But what the courtship lacked in impetuosity if gained in depth of friendship and understanding. That friendship, unscathed and undiminished, withstood the test of time, and was the basis of a fruitful and exemplary married life.

Isie was an intelligent young woman who, like Smuts, had scored highly in her Matriculation exam. It was thought, as a girl, a future in higher education was largely closed to her. The time spent in her company, whether reading poetry and singing together at the piano, or walking together in the mornings and evenings on the journey to and from Victoria College, did much to break down Smuts's social isolation, enabling him to cast some of those protective prejudices which he had harboured of the "puerile element", that is to say his peers. As he wrote in his diary some years later: "[She], less idealistic than I, but more human, recalled me from my intellectual isolation and made me return to my fellows."

==== Political awakening ====
In 1888 Cecil Rhodes paid a visit to Victoria College. As the leader of the college debating society, Smuts was called upon to deliver the welcoming address on behalf of the student body. Rhodes, on the verge of becoming Prime Minister of Cape Colony, was a vocal advocate of Southern African political and economic unity. Now, on the occasion of this visit, Smuts chose to give his address on the theme of Pan-Africanism.

Smuts's engagement with politics was very much a product of his time at Stellenbosch. While his parents' political moderation and rejection of Afrikaner exclusivism had left him largely unencumbered by any innate prejudices, it was his time at Victoria College which saw him develop his own independent political outlook. These views developed in tandem with another of Smuts's fixations, his philosophical pursuit of the embodiment of unity. This intellectual quest was later to develop into his philosophy of Holism, but even at this early undeveloped stage he brought these ideas to bear in shaping his political opinions. So it was that Smuts emerged as an outspoken supporter of South African unity, and, by extension, a supporter of Rhodes.

Two essays written during this time foreshadow Smuts's later views, both political and philosophical. The first of these, entitled South African Customs Union, was written in 1890 in competition for the JB Ebden prize offered by the University of the Cape of Good Hope. This essay, an examination of the economic relations of the colonies and states of South Africa, though 'Highly Commended' by the judges, failed to win the prize. Nevertheless, despite achieving only modest success, it is unsurpassed as a clear and authoritative statement of Smuts's political outlook at this time.

Within the essay Smuts considered the vexed question of the political and economic relations of the colonies and states of South Africa. Though close in terms of geographical proximity, their troubled relations over the preceding quarter century had done much to create an atmosphere of political estrangement. Smuts considered that this estrangement had come about largely as the result of petty jealousies, fostered by politicians interested more in their own parochial concerns than those of South Africa as a whole. And it was to South Africa as a whole that Smuts looked; he did not take the side of one colony or state over the others, but rather treated the region as one single unity. In his own words he summed this up:

The general maxim in this particular case of South African politics and interests is this: no policy in any Colony or State is sound, which does not recognise, and frame its measures as much as possible in accordance with, the fact that South African is one, that consisting as it does of separate parts, it yet forms one commercial and moral unity.

A call for unity was his emotional response to the question. Coming down to earth, he proposed two concrete policies as steps towards its ultimate realisation - expansion of a pan-South African railway system, fostering greater commercial links and binding the region together, combined with the elimination of all regional tariffs and trade barriers with the formation of a South African customs union.

The writing of this essay was an important formative experience for Smuts. For the first time he had seriously grappled with questions of contemporary politics, and in doing so came to comprehend something of his own political role in resolving them. As he was to write:

In trying to master the [question of a customs union for South Africa] and its relation to other South African problems, I had to study the relations which have existed between the various territories of South Africa during the past quarter century; and to that study I owe the birth of my political consciousness. As I studied old Blue and other books, it dawned for the first time on me, that I too was a member for better or worse of the great South African community, and that as such I too would be called upon to contribute my drop, or fraction of a drop, of thought or action to the great "river of ocean" which still has to sweep through the Augeas-stable of the South.

Seminal though this moment was, it was just a start. As his biographer, WK Hancock, noted: "All the same, [Smuts] knew that nations are not made by administrative arrangements alone". In The Conditions of Future South African Literature, his next essay of significance, he dealt with the other significant factor in nation-building - the cultural and emotional ties needed to form a united community. Within this essay, not at first sight written on an overtly political topic, Smuts declared that a true South African literature did not and could not exist until a true South African nation had been born. The question then arose - what was hindering this development? Smuts identified the inhibiting factor as the relations between Briton and Boer - particularly the effect of the influx of British emigrants to the gold mines of the Transvaal on the deeply conservative Afrikaner population. The relations between these two groups were fraught; the discover of gold and the rapid industrialisation of the Transvaal had done much to disturb the settled ways of the Boer population. With its vast mineral wealth the Transvaal was rapidly becoming the most significant economic unit of South Africa, but the sudden tide of primarily British immigrants caused a great deal of unrest, with the established population decrying the immorality and degeneracy they perceived in the new mineworkers. These divisions, though strongest in the Transvaal, existed to one degree or another throughout South Africa. Smuts, though sympathising with the concerns of the old population, fearful their established ways and traditions would be swamped in a flood of migration, urged the Afrikaners to embrace the new spirit of dynamism which he saw the new migrants injecting. Likewise he exhorted the new population to integrate with the old, to consolidate the white population both for the sake of a future South African nation but also to secure their survival in the face of the vastly greater Native population.

== A new direction ==
In later years Smuts summed up this period:

The five years I spent at Victoria College, Stellenbosch ... were probably the happiest of my life. I read much and widely, but especially the poets and philosophical writers. I had not yet any defined channel of thinking or feeling. My mind was simply dazzled and attracted by beauty in all its intellectual forms ... My passion for nature made me spend most of my free time in the mountains, along the streams and in the innumerable winding valleys.

In the examinations of 1891, Smuts took a double-First in Literature and Science. He applied for, and won, the Ebden scholarship for overseas study offered by the University of the Cape of Good Hope. On 23 September 1891 he departed the Cape, on board the ship Roslyn Castle, bound for the United Kingdom and a place at Cambridge University.

=== Cambridge ===
Smuts was admitted to Christ's College, where he elected to study Law.

The choice of Law marked the start of a new chapter for Smuts. The preceding years at Stellenbosch had been ones of tremendous intellectual development. From the narrow focus of his upbringing, his outlook had now expanded, awakening within him a consciousness of the breadth of knowledge now open before him. Smuts, though remaining an adherent of the Church, and respectful of the Bible and its teachings, had developed a more questioning and critical outlook during the course of his studies. Whereas at the outset of his university career he was content to follow his parents' wishes and be ordained into the Church, as his time at Victoria College came to an end he found himself more and more unwilling to commit to this path. Though he had not as yet wholly rejected the idea of ordination, he wished for a period of more diversified study before making that decision. So it was that Smuts came to select Law, rather than Divinity or Philosophy - the logical choices for a future Minister of Religion.

During his time at Cambridge Smuts maintained a regular correspondence with his old friend and tutor Professor Marais. Smuts's choice of Law gave rise to a lively discussion between the two, with Marais regretting Smuts's choice, declaring Law to be 'simply classified humbug' and accusing 'those who pore over legal tomes' of having a 'contracted view of life'. In response Smuts published an essay in Christ's College Magazine in defence of Law. Entitled 'Law - A Liberal Study', it attempted to rebut these criticisms, declaring that from Moses onwards lawyers had been the 'great lights and ornaments of the Church' and identifying within Law '...as it develops through the ages of human history, ...the deepest, truest, most permanent thought and social achievement of progressive humanity.' Aside from friendship on this intellectual level, Marais was also able to come to Smuts's rescue at a time of awkward crisis.

Smuts came to Cambridge at the age of twenty-one, three or more years older than the typical university undergraduate. He was isolated from the other men of his year by a different social background, different upbringing, and different attitudes. Smuts's disdain for frivolity and laxity combined with his lack of interest in sports and his decision to take up lodgings outside the college, did much to divide him from the other students. During his first year at Cambridge, Smuts suffered from tremendous homesickness, describing himself as being 'utterly desolate'. Yet during this time Smuts had not found himself without social opportunities - as his biographer WK Hancock wrote:

...[H]is fellow ... lodger was a serious and friendly man called John Gregg, who became in later life Archbishop of Armagh. Gregg invited him in the first week or two to come for a walk ... but Smuts never proposed a second walk and Gregg got the impression that he wanted to be left to himself. In the same year at Christ's there was a warm-hearted medical student called Auden, who became in later life Chief Medial Officer at Birmingham and the father of a famous poet; but Smuts never returned the invitations to breakfast which he received once or twice from Auden and their acquaintance never ripened. Early in his first term Smuts received and accepted invitations to join the debating society and to write for the College magazine; but the never followed up the chances of friendship which these activities put in his way.

This could of course have simply been a case of Smuts's diffidence and reserve re-asserting itself in the face of new and unfamiliar surrounding; however Smuts's biographers almost universally ascribe it to the poverty Smuts endured during this first year.

The Ebden scholarship was usually worth £200 per year. However, in 1891, due to a failure of the fund's investments, it was worth only £100. The sale of Smuts's personal livestock holdings on the family farm had enabled him to pay his sea passage and left him with a small residue to bank, yet despite this there remained a substantial gap between his resources and his essential needs as a student. During his first term Christ's College provided him with a small scholarship, but the gap remained. This was a crippling burden for Smuts, yet it was Professor Marais who was to come to his rescue. Smuts, having confided his difficulties to Marais towards the end of 1891 received by immediate return a cheque for £50. Marais urged Smuts to write to him whenever he felt himself in need, in return of which Smuts took out a life insurance policy naming Marais as beneficiary. Should Smuts have died this policy would cover the loans, but while he lived, Smuts's integrity was Marais's only cover.

With Marais's loans combined with the Ebden scholarship, Smuts began to enjoy a degree of financial security. Though far from affluent he was at least able to meet his basic expenses. From his second year onwards Smuts began to enter more into the social arena of the university. He ceased to be lonely, making a number of friends and acquaintances, principally amongst the other colonial students. Though no longer so reclusive as he had been during his first year, he remained extremely serious and devoted to his work; an attitude which served as a barrier separating him from the English undergraduates, though not from the Fellows at Cambridge, with many of whom he struck up friendships.

In respect of his studies, he achieved the unique distinction of sitting both parts of the Law Tripos in the same year, passing both with first-class honours. Over the course of his studies at Cambridge Smuts won many academic awards and accolades, culminating, in 1893, with the award of the prestigious George Long prize in Roman Law and Jurisprudence - a particular honour given that the prize was very rarely awarded as the rigorous academic standard required was very rarely met. This was all combined with extensive extracurricular reading and private research into various topics including poetry, philosophy, botany, and archaeology. As his biographer WK Hancock wrote:

... he pursued all his other interests after he had taken the measure of his day's work. He was able to do this because he worked unusually faster than other people and because he found recreation, not in the things that are fritterers of time, but in reading, thinking, writing, exploring.

=== Aftermath ===
Smuts's time at Cambridge had been one of outstanding success; his tutor Professor FW Maitland, himself one of the most eminent legal minds of the time, described Smuts as the most brilliant Law student he had ever taught. With testimonials such as this, in summer 1894 Smuts was able to persuade the Ebden trustees to award him £100 for a further year's study. After a short holiday in Strasbourg, spent studying English conveyancing and German philosophy, Smuts returned to England. For a short time he contemplated moving to the Netherlands to seek a Dutch degree, but by October 1894 he had instead decided to read for the Bar. In December 1894 he passed the Honours Examination of the Inns of Court, passing first in his year. Smuts was called to the Middle Temple and soon received an offer of a fellowship in Law from his old college, Christ's. The possibility of a distinguished legal career in England, whether in practice or in academia, now lay before him. Instead, he rejected both paths; in June 1895, as his Ebden funding came to an end, the homesick Smuts returned to the Cape, determined to make his future there.

== Select bibliography ==
=== Primary sources ===
- Hancock, WK and van der Poel, J (eds) - Selections from the Smuts Papers, 1886–1950, (7 vols), (1966–73)

=== Smuts, General ===
- Cameron, T - Jan Smuts: An Illustrated Biography, (1994)
- Hancock, WK - Smuts: 1. The Sanguine Years, 1870–1919, (1962)
- Ingham, K - Jan Christian Smuts: The Conscience of a South African, (1986)
- Millin, SG - General Smuts, (2 vols), (1933)
- Smuts, JC - Jan Christian Smuts, (1952)
