= Big House, Irene =

Historic house in Irene, South Africa

Big House
- Groothuis
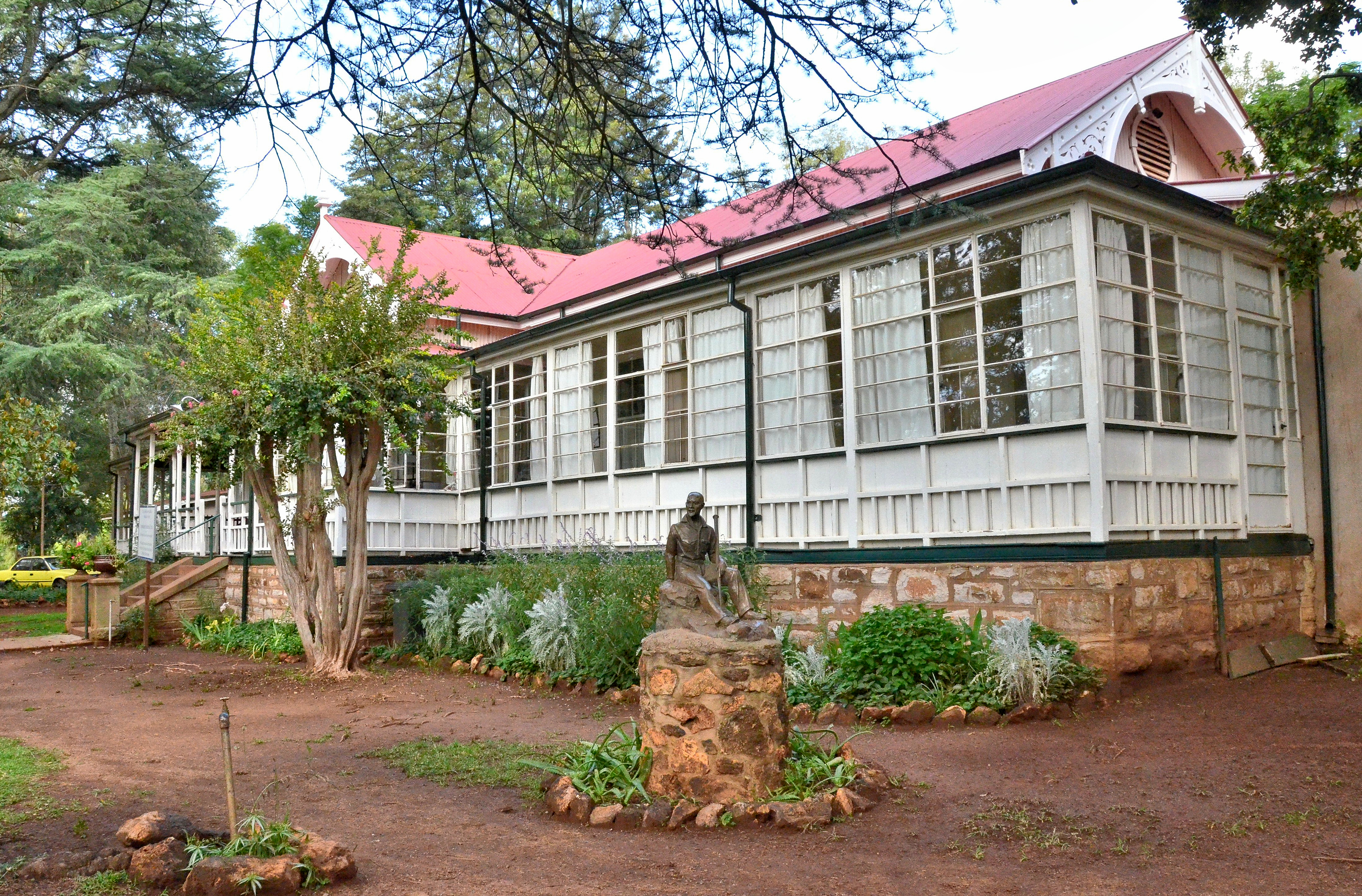
- The Big House and a statue of Jan Smuts
- Established: 1909
- Location: Jan Smuts Avenue, Irene (City of Tshwane Metropolitan Municipality), Gauteng
- Coordinates: 25°53′21.5″S 28°13′51.2″E
- Website: www.smutshouse.co.za

The Big House (Afrikaans: Groothuis), or Smuts House, is a historic house in Irene, Gauteng, which was inhabited by South African statesman Jan Smuts and his family. Today, it is part of the Smuts House Museum.

== History ==
The land on which the house is now situated was previously owned by Michiel Christiaan, son of Voortrekker Daniel Elardus Erasmus, who subdivided his farm between his three sons. It was bought by Jan Smuts in 1908 for £900. Twelve squatter families were inhabiting the property in 1908 and remained for a few years.

Smuts purchased a wood-and-iron building for £300 during a sale in Middelburg by the Imperial Government of military property, so that it would serve as a home for his family. The building is believed to have been prefabricated in Britain before being shipped to India and later to South Africa, where it served as an officer's mess at Lord Kitchener's headquarters in Middelburg. It was re-erected at the property in 1909, and Mrs Smuts moved her family into it on 10 July while General Smuts was at sea.

Though initially meant to be temporary, the family ultimately remained in the Big House, and numerous additions were added to it. The Smuts raised seven children in it.

The house was inherited by Mrs Kitty Smuts, Jan Smuts' daughter-in-law and widow of Japie Smuts. She found it difficult to maintain, and after unsuccessfully offering it to various organisations, it was bought in July 1960 for £7000 by ex-serviceman and Pretoria attorney Mr Braithwaite.

On 31 October 1969, the Big House was declared a National Monument as per the Government Gazette. Since 1961, it has been owned by the General Smuts Foundation, known until 1994 as the General Smuts War Veterans' Foundation. The house reflects Smuts' modest lifestyle.

== Museum ==
The house today is part of the Smuts House Museum, operated by the General Smuts Foundation, which is dedicated to the legacy of Jan Smuts. A short walk from the house is Smuts Koppie, where the ashes of Jan Smuts and his wife Isie were scattered. The museum also has a tea garden for light refreshments.

== Gallery ==
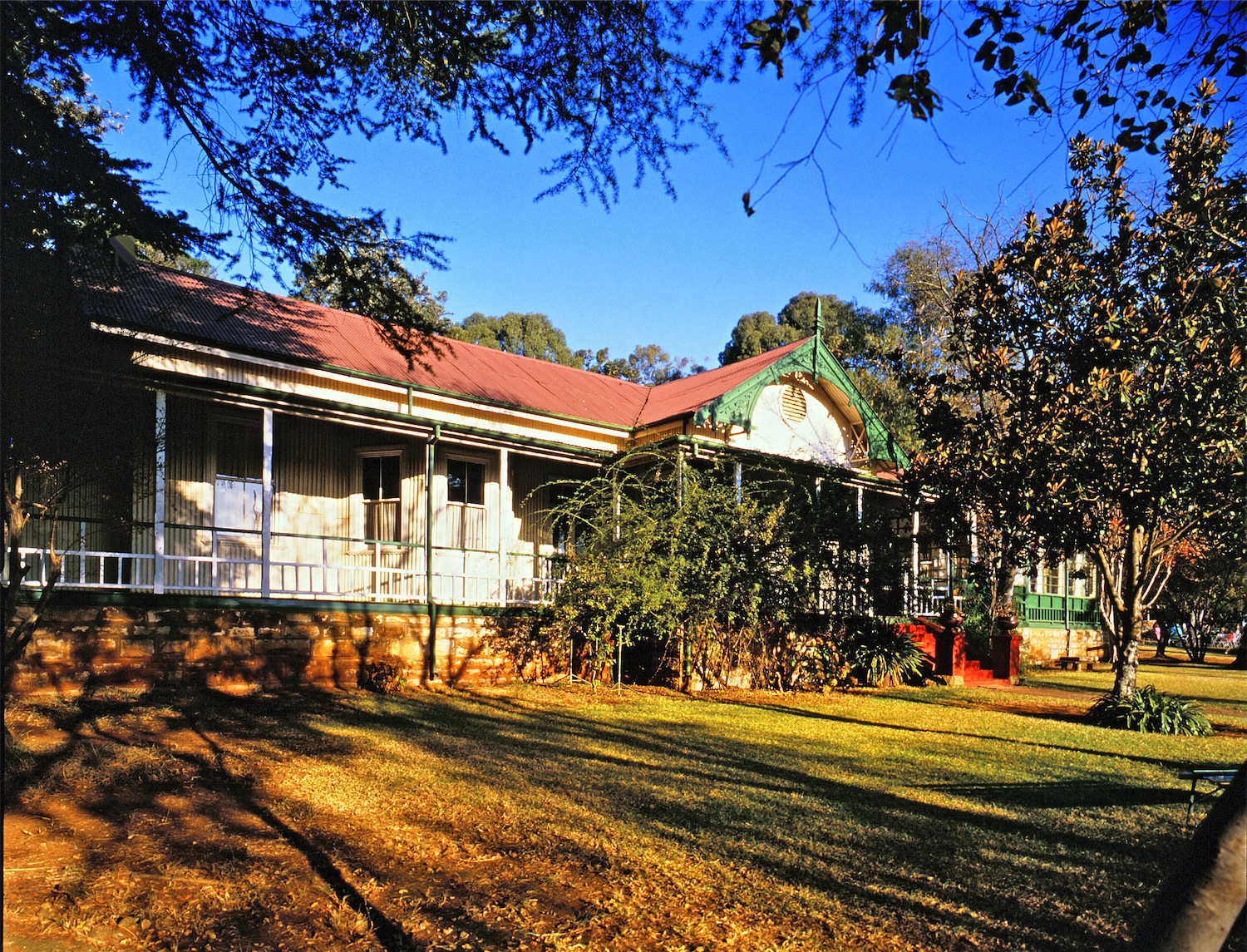

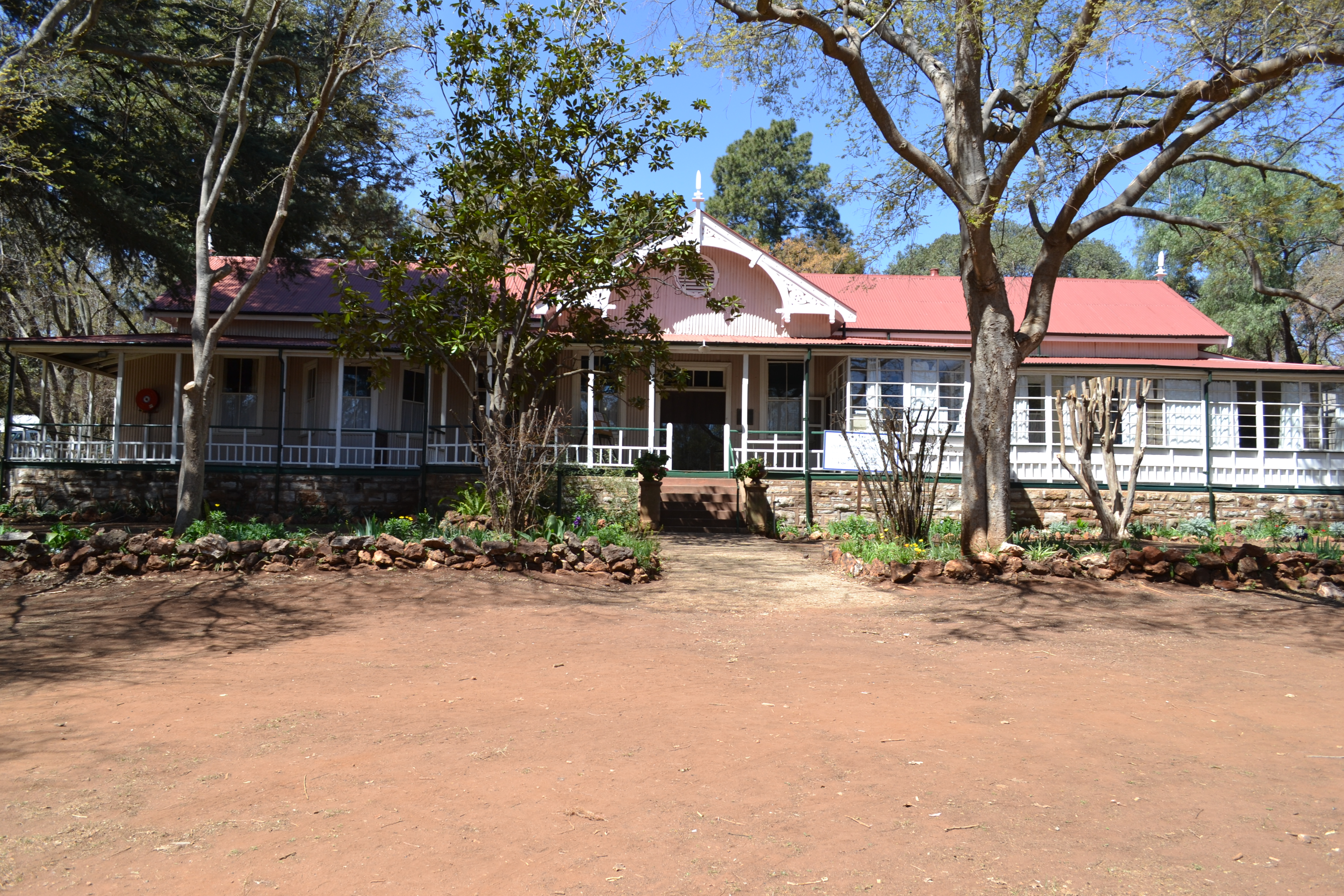

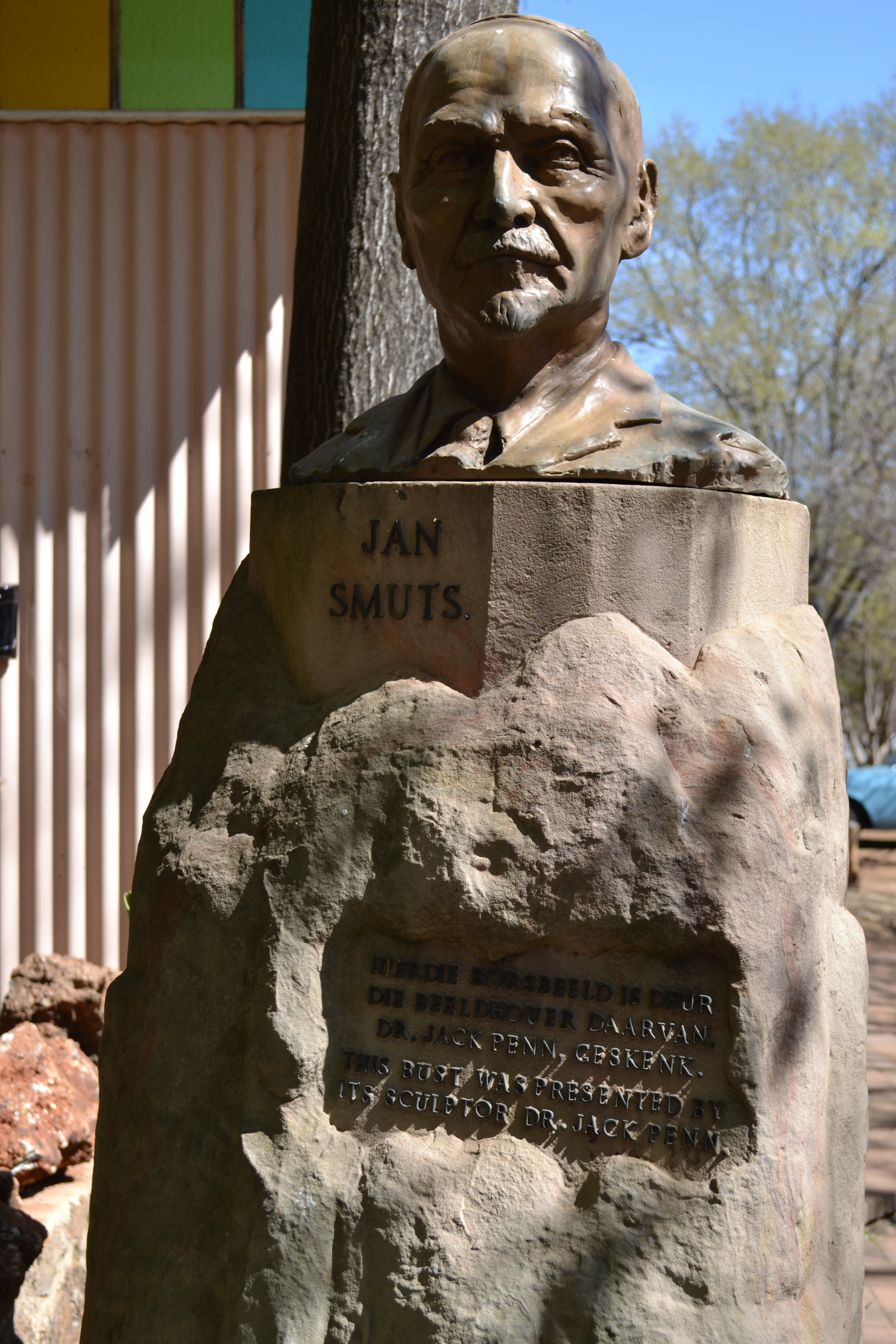

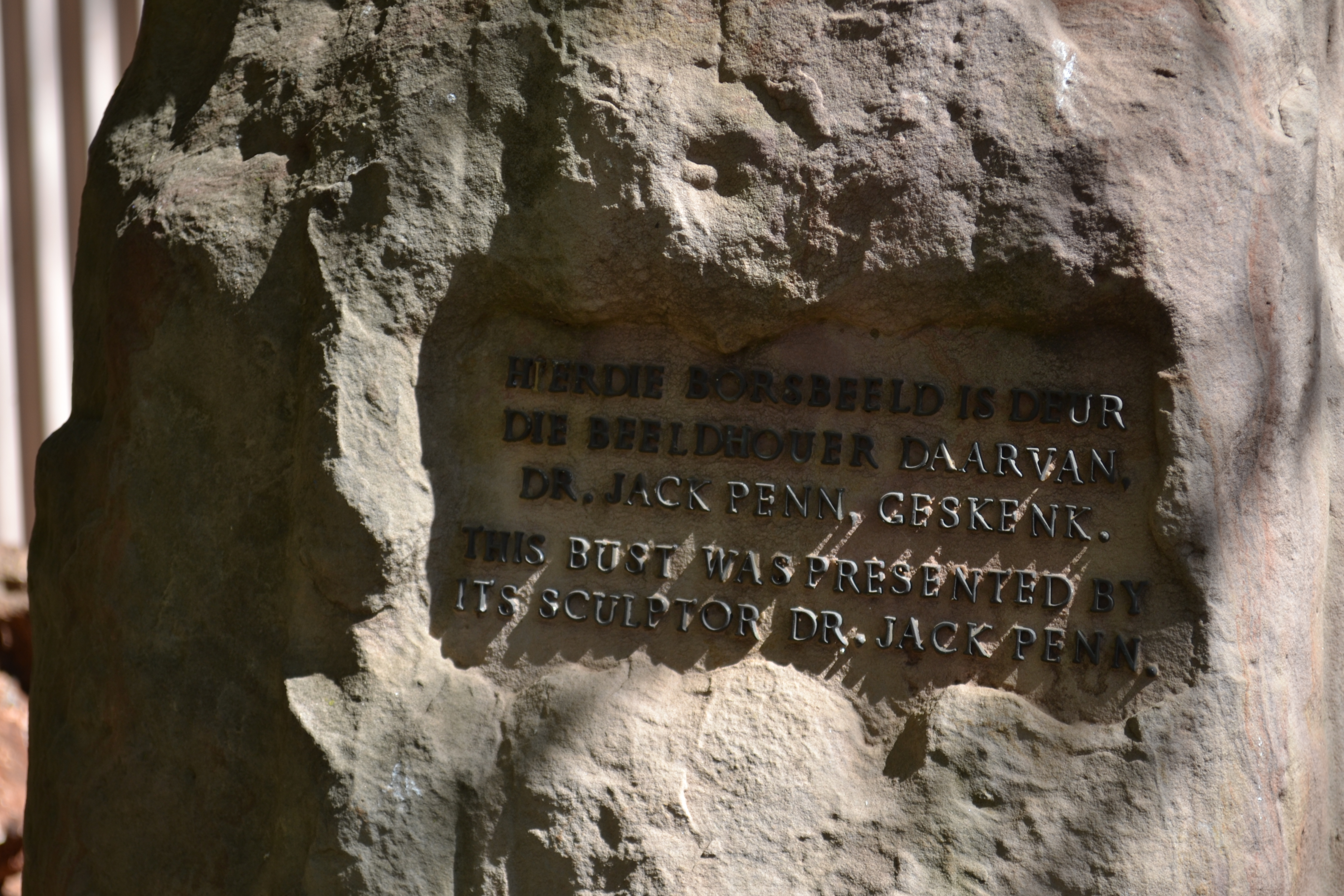

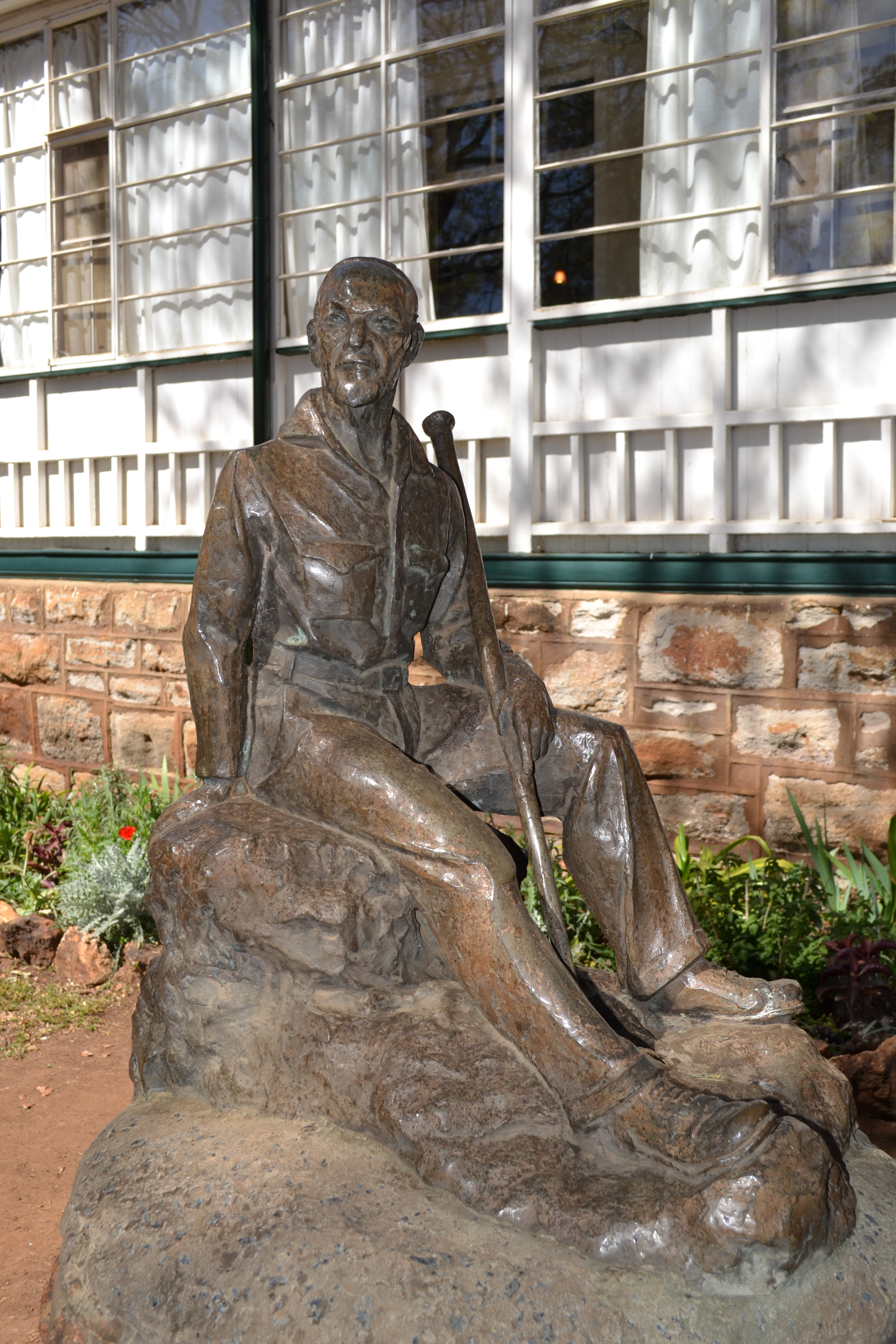

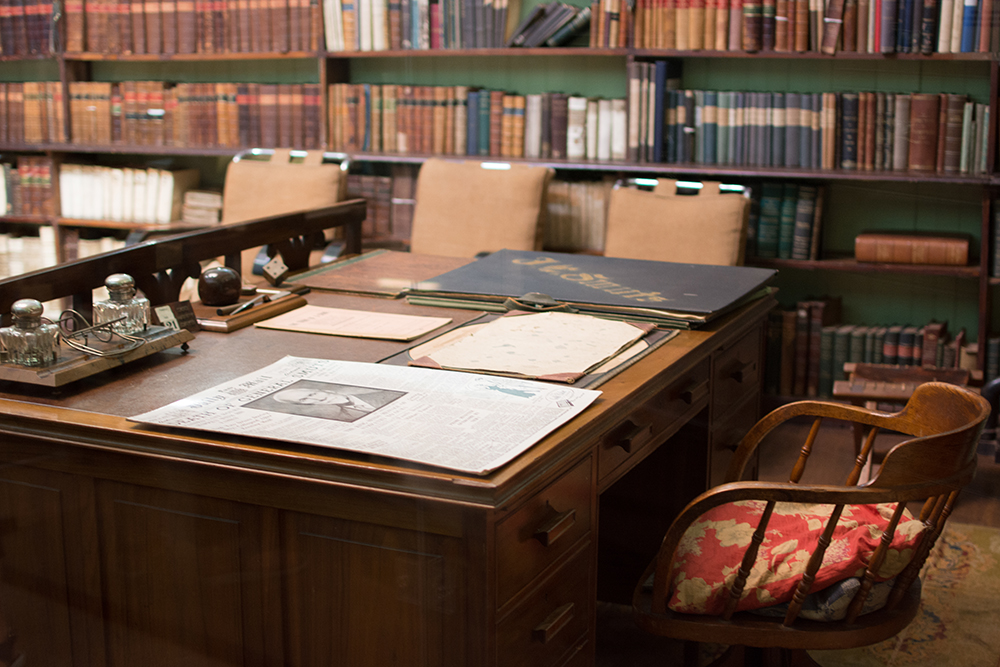

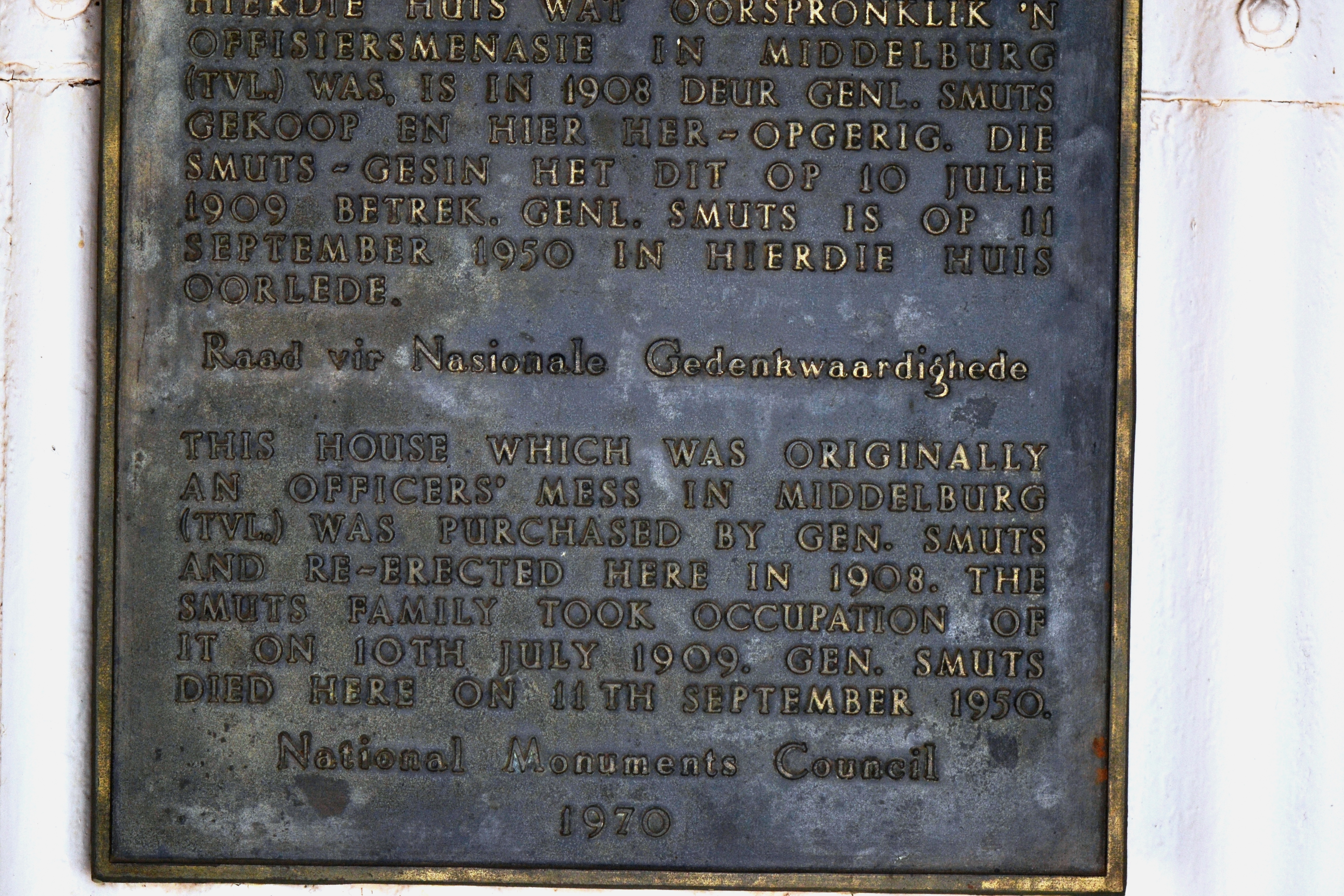

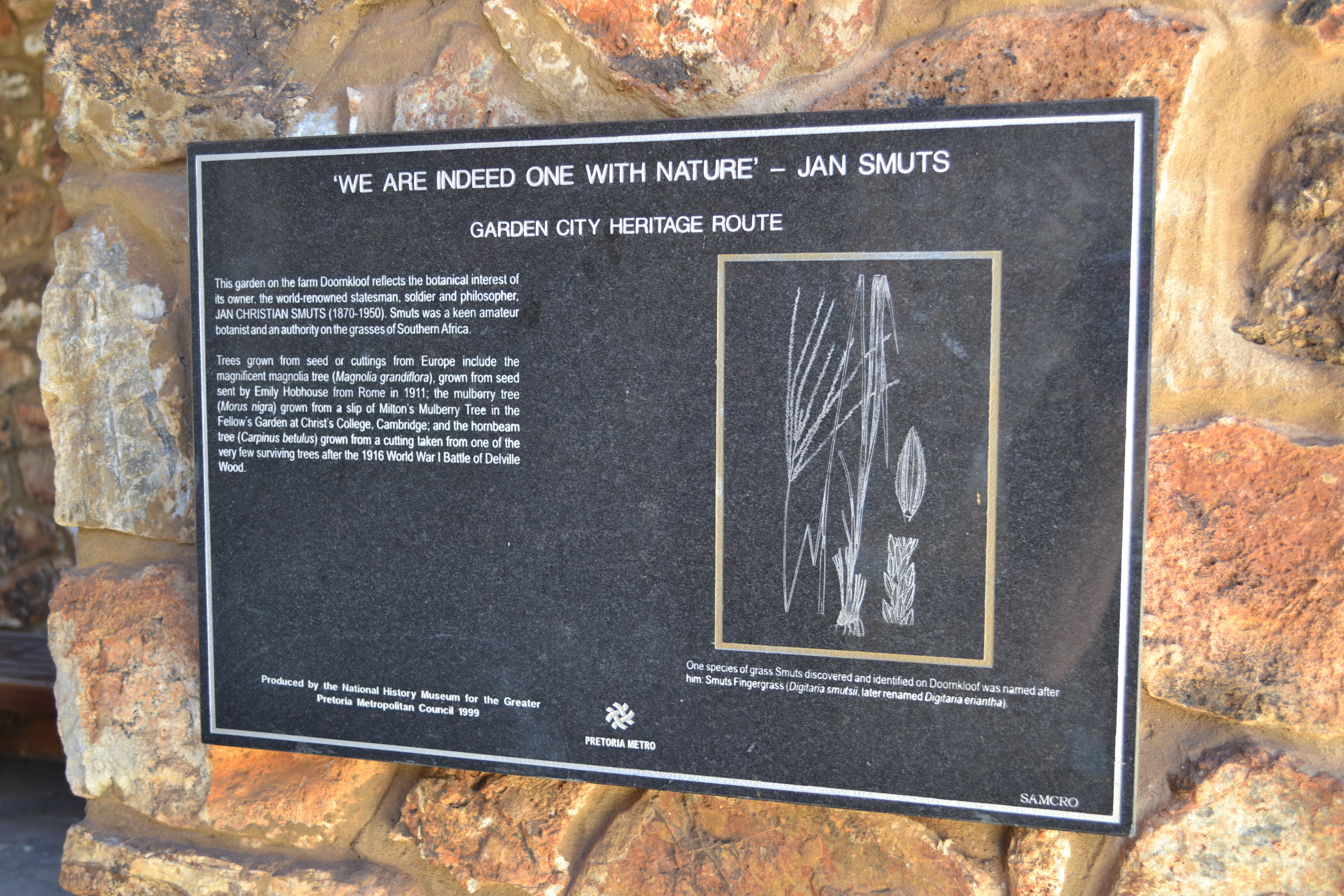
